= Leith (disambiguation) =

Leith is a port and area of Edinburgh, Scotland

Leith may also refer to:

== Places ==
=== Australia ===
- Leith, Tasmania

=== Canada ===
- Leith, Ontario

=== New Zealand ===
- Leith Valley, Dunedin
- Water of Leith (New Zealand), a river

=== South Georgia ===
- Leith Harbour

=== United Kingdom ===
- Leith (ward), Edinburgh, Scotland
- Leith (UK Parliament constituency), Edinburgh, Scotland
- Leith Hill, Surrey, England
- River Leith, Cumbria, England
- Water of Leith, in Edinburgh, Scotland

=== United States ===
- Leith, North Dakota
- Leith, Ohio
- Leith, Pennsylvania; see List of places in Pennsylvania: La–Ll

== People ==
- Leith (surname)

=== Given name ===
- Leith Anderson, American evangelical Christian leader, author, and pastor
- Leith Brodie (born 1986), Australian swimmer
- Leith Clark (born 1979), Canadian-born English fashion stylist, editor, and fashion journalist
- Leith Dunn, Jamaican sociologist, writer and academic
- Leith Mulligan (born 1972), Australian sports journalist
- Leith Mullings (1945–2020), Jamaican-born author, anthropologist and professor
- Leith Ratten, Australian convicted murderer
- Leith Ross, Canadian indie rock singer-songwriter and guitarist
- Leith Shankland (born 1991), South African swimmer
- Leith Stevens (1909–1970), American composer and conductor
- Lieth Von Stein (1946–1988), American murder victim

== Other uses ==
- HMS Leith, ships of the Royal Navy

== See also ==
- Laith, an Arabic name
- Leath, an ancient subdivision of Cumberland, England
- Leithe, Bochum, North Rhine-Westphalia, Germany
- Craigleith, Scotland
- Lethe (disambiguation)
- Lieth, in Germany
