= National Association of Evangelicals =

American religious organization

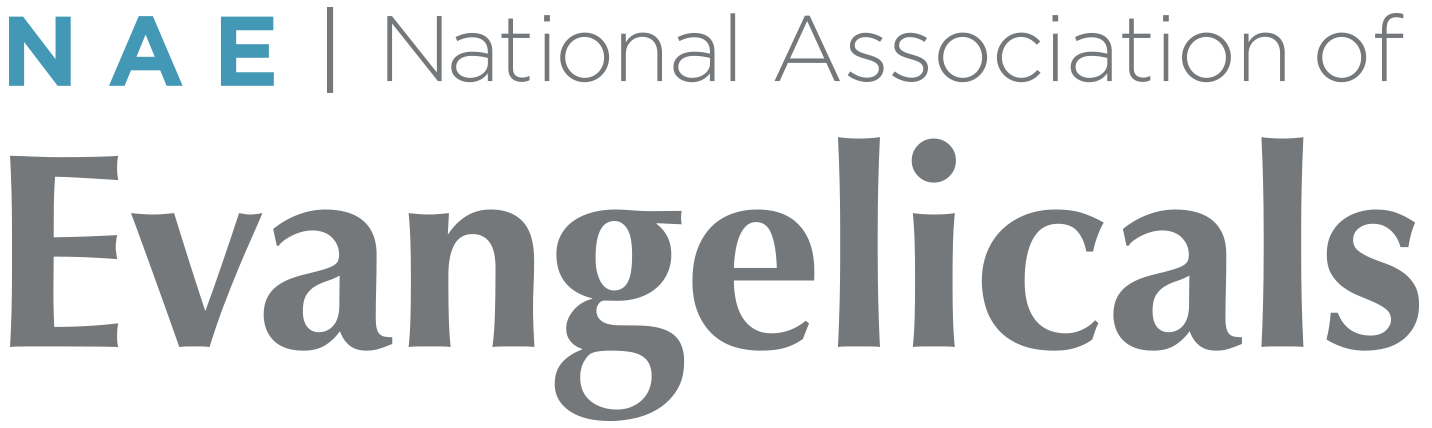
- Founded: April 1942; 84 years ago
- Type: Evangelical organization
- Headquarters: Washington, D.C., U.S.
- Region served: North America
- Members: 39 Christian denominations (45,000 churches)
- President: Walter Kim, since January 2020
- Affiliations: World Evangelical Alliance
- Website: www.nae.org

The National Association of Evangelicals (NAE) is a national evangelical alliance in the United States and is a member of the World Evangelical Alliance. The association represents more than 45,000 local churches from about 40 different Christian denominations and serves a constituency of millions. The mission of the NAE is to honor God by connecting and representing evangelicals in the United States.

The NAE seeks to strengthen denominations and ministries by offering resources to inform and inspire evangelical leaders, and facilitating collaboration among evangelical leaders and groups. The NAE also represents its membership's concerns to the U.S. Congress, the White House, and courts. The NAE Chaplains Commission endorses and supports chaplains in the U.S. military and other institutions. World Relief is the NAE's humanitarian arm.

While the NAE headquarters are located in Washington, D.C., its staff and constituency live and work all throughout North America. The association is currently led by NAE president Walter Kim.

== History ==
The National Association of Evangelicals (NAE) was formed by a group of 147 people who met in St. Louis, Missouri on April 7–9, 1942. The Fundamentalist–Modernist Controversy and the related isolation of various evangelical denominations and leaders provided the impetus for developing such an organization.

Early leaders in the movement included Harold Ockenga, David Otis Fuller, Will Houghton, Harry A. Ironside, Bob Jones, Sr., Paul S. Rees, Leslie Roy Marston, John R. Rice, Charles Woodbridge, and J. Elwin Wright. Houghton called for a meeting in Chicago, Illinois in 1941. A committee was formed with Wright as chairman, and a national conference for United Action Among Evangelicals was called to meet in April 1942. Harold Ockenga was appointed the first president (1942–44).

Carl McIntire and Harvey Springer led in organizing the American Council of Christian Churches (now with 7 member bodies) in September 1941. It was a more militant and fundamentalist organization set up in opposition to the Federal Council of Churches (now National Council of Churches with 36 member bodies). McIntire invited the Evangelicals for United Action to join with them, but those who met in St. Louis declined the offer.

The organization provisionally founded in 1942 was called the "National Association of Evangelicals for United Action". In 1943 the proposed constitution and doctrinal statement were amended and adopted, and the name shortened to the "National Association of Evangelicals".

By the 1950s, NAE's Washington, D.C., office gained a reputation as a service organization that could get things done. President Eisenhower welcomed an NAE delegation to the White House – a first-time honor for the association.

At the NAE's 1983 conference in Orlando, Florida, the Rev. Arthur Evans Gay, Jr., NAE President, introduced President Ronald Reagan for what was to become known as his "Evil Empire" speech. The 50th anniversary of the organization was celebrated in 1992 at the annual March Convention at the Chicago Hyatt Hotel. President George H. W. Bush spoke to the World Relief annual luncheon at the invitation of the organization's president Arthur Gay, making Bush the third President to address the NAE. During the convention Billy Graham spoke for the last time at an NAE gathering, calling on evangelicals to a renewed commitment to spread the gospel.

In a move signaling its primary focus, the NAE changed its annual convention venue from hotels and convention centers to churches. In 2003, the first church-hosted convention was held at Wooddale Church in Eden Prairie, Minnesota. President George W. Bush, running for reelection in 2004, visited the NAE convention at New Life Church in Colorado Springs, Colo., via satellite link and told the delegates, "You cannot endorse me, but I endorse you." In 2004, the NAE adopted "For the Health of the Nation: An Evangelical Call to Civic Responsibility" document as its framework for engagement in political action.

Ted Haggard, an American evangelical pastor and founder and former pastor of New Life Church in Colorado Springs, served as President of the National Association of Evangelicals (NAE) from 2003 until November 2006. Haggard made national headlines in November 2006 in a sex and drug use scandal. Haggard resigned his post shortly after the allegations became public.

Leith Anderson served as interim president twice before he was named president in October 2007. During Anderson's presidency, the NAE stabilized and grew with expanded membership, significant grant funding and many new staff and programs, including an annual retreat of denomination leaders, NAE Talk consultations, Evangelical Leaders Survey, Evangelicals magazine, Today's Conversation podcast, and documents and publications including "Code of Ethics for Pastors," "When God and Science Meet," "Theology of Sex," and "For the Health of the Nation" (revised), among others. As NAE president, Anderson regularly taught in seminaries, addressed evangelical concerns with elected officials, counseled denominational executives, and provided theological and cultural commentary to leading news outlets.

Walter Kim was elected NAE president at the October 2019 board meeting to begin his role in January 2020. Other leadership elections were made at that board meeting including John Jenkins, senior pastor of First Baptist Church of Glenarden, to the office of chair of the NAE board; and Jo Anne Lyon, general superintendent emerita and ambassador of The Wesleyan Church, to the office of vice chair.

== Initiatives ==
=== National Religious Broadcasters ===
In 1944, the NAE formed the National Religious Broadcasters (NRB) at its convention in Columbus, Ohio. NRB was the first of many related service agencies NAE would charter with a particular purpose in mind. Following the lead of CBS and NBC, the Mutual Radio Network had announced it would no longer sell time for religious broadcasting and turned the Protestant broadcasting slot over to the Federal Council of Churches. NRB, after holding its own constitutional convention later that year, responded to the challenge, eventually persuading the networks to reverse their policies. NRB is now a separate organization.

=== Evangelical Chaplains Commission ===
In addition to NRB, NAE created the Chaplains Commission in 1944 to assist evangelical chaplains in the U.S. military. The NAE Chaplains Commission continues to provide support and endorsement for evangelicals to minister as military chaplains to three branches of the U.S. Armed Forces and the U.S. Department of Veterans Affairs. Free exercise and expression of faith in U.S. military institutions is a primary cause that the Evangelical Chaplains Commission supports. The commission also supports institutional chaplains who serve in hospitals, prisons, workplaces, and other areas of ministry.

=== World Relief ===
The War Relief Commission was formed in 1944 to address the needs of war-torn Europe. The War Relief Commission sent clothing and food to victims of World War II. After the war, the War Relief Commission expanded its outreach beyond war relief, and its name changed to World Relief. As the humanitarian arm of the NAE, World Relief offers assistance to victims of poverty, disease, hunger, war, disasters and persecution. The organization has offices worldwide. It is supported by churches and individual donors, as well as through United States Government grants from USAID and other agencies. World Relief's core programs focus on microfinance, AIDS prevention and care, maternal and child health, child development, agricultural training, disaster response, refugee resettlement and immigrant services.

=== Missio Nexus ===
In 1945, NAE created the Evangelical Foreign Missions Association (later called the Evangelical Fellowship of Mission Agencies, then The Mission Exchange, and now Missio Nexus). It was chartered to handle the special needs of missionaries and their agencies and is the largest missionary association in the world. Missio Nexus now operates independently of the NAE, though it is a member of the NAE.

=== New International Version ===
An NAE initiative in the 1950s with long-range consequences was the formation of a committee in 1957 to explore the possibility of a new translation of the Bible. The National Council had five years earlier released the Revised Standard Version, but the new translation did not prove popular among many evangelicals. The NAE committee began meeting with a similar committee commissioned by the Christian Reformed Church in 1961. By 1965, the two committees formed the independent Committee on Bible Translation and two years later, the New York Bible Society (today the International Bible Society) became the official sponsor. In 1978, the first copies of the New International Version of the Bible came off the presses.

=== For the Health of the Nation ===
The Evangelical Project for Public Engagement was initiated at the 60th annual convention of the NAE in March 2001. The project team worked to articulate a framework for evangelical civic and political engagement for the 21st century under the direction of Richard Cizik, then-vice president of governmental affairs. The project generated a major volume edited by Diane Knippers and Ronald Sider and published by Baker Books titled "Toward an Evangelical Public Policy."

"For the Health of the Nation: An Evangelical Call to Civic Responsibility" calls evangelicals to address seven spheres of social involvement from a biblical framework and also provides specific principles of engagement. The NAE's political action is based on the document, which outlines eight different issues that are important to evangelicals, including religious freedom, family life and protection of children, sanctity of life, caring for the poor and vulnerable, human rights, racial justice and reconciliation, peacemaking, and caring for creation.

While the underlying principles of the document have not changed, the NAE Board of Directors updated and adopted the revised version in 2018. New attention has been called to long-time social ills, including the broken immigration system, sexual harassment and abuse, human trafficking, racial injustice and white supremacy. Concern about these issues was implicit in the original document and is further elaborated in the updated edition, notably through the addition of a section on racial justice and reconciliation.

== Member denominations ==
The following Protestant church denominations were members as of 2024. Many Christian organizations, academic groups, and individual churches are also members.

NAE Member Denominations
Denomination	Tradition	Year Joined
Advent Christian Church	Adventism	
Aspire Network	Baptist	
Assemblies of God USA	Pentecostal	1943
Brethren Church	Anabaptist	1968
Brethren in Christ Church	Anabaptist	1949
Christian and Missionary Alliance	Keswickian	1966
Christian Reformed Church in North America	Reformed (Continental)	1943–51; 1988
Church of God (Anderson)	Holiness	2021
Church of God (Cleveland, Tennessee)	Pentecostal	1944
Church of the Nazarene	Methodism	1984
Conservative Congregational Christian Conference	Reformed (Congregational)	1951
Converge Worldwide (previously Baptist General Conference)	Baptist	1966
ECO: A Covenant Order of Evangelical Presbyterians	Reformed (Presbyterian)	2015
Elim Fellowship	Pentecostal	1947
Evangelical Church, The	Holiness	1969
Evangelical Congregational Church	Holiness	1962
Evangelical Free Church of America	Pietism	1943
Evangelical Friends Church International	Quaker	1971
Evangelical Presbyterian Church	Reformed (Presbyterian)	1982
Every Nation Churches	Charismatic	
Fellowship of Evangelical Churches	Anabaptist	
Foursquare Church, The	Pentecostal	1952
Free Methodist Church of North America	Methodism	1944
Grace Communion International	Adventism	1997
International Pentecostal Church of Christ	Pentecostal	1946
International Pentecostal Holiness Church	Pentecostal	1943
Missionary Church, Inc.	Anabaptist	1944
North American Baptist Conference	Baptist	
Open Bible Church	Pentecostal	1943
Pentecostal Free Will Baptist Church	Pentecostal	1988
Primitive Methodist Church USA	Methodism	1946
Royalhouse Chapel International	Pentecostal	2016
Salvation Army, The	Methodism	1990
Seventh Day Baptist General Conference of the USA & Canada	Baptist	2018
Transformation Ministries	Baptist	
United Brethren in Christ	Anabaptist	1953
U.S. Conference of the Mennonite Brethren Churches	Anabaptist	1946
Vineyard USA, The	Charismatic	
Wesleyan Church, The	Methodism	1948

== Board Chair (called President until 1992) ==
- Harold Ockenga (1942–1944)
- Leslie Roy Marston (1944–46)
- Rutherford Decker (1946–48)
- Stephen W. Paine (1948–50)
- Frederick C. Fowler (1950–52)
- Paul S. Rees (1952–54)
- Henry H. Savage (1954–56)
- Paul P. Petticord (1956–58)
- Herbert S. Mekeel (1958–60)
- Thomas F. Zimmerman (1960–62)
- Robert A. Cook (1962–64)
- Jared F. Gerig (1964–66)
- Rufus Jones (1966–68)
- Arnold Olson (1968–70)
- Hudson T. Armerding (1970–72)
- Myron F. Boyd (1972–74)
- Paul E. Toms (1974–76)
- Nathan Bailey (1976–78)
- Carl H. Lundquist (1978–80)
- J. Floyd Williams (1980–82)
- Arthur Evans Gay, Jr. (1982–84)
- Robert W. McIntyre (1984–86)
- Ray H. Hughes (1986–88)
- John H. White (1988–90)
- B. Edgar Johnson (1990–92)
- Don Argue (1992–95)
- Leonard Hoffman (1995–98)
- Lamar Vest (1998–2000)
- Ed Foggs (2000–02)
- William Hamel (2002–06)
- L. Roy Taylor (2006–20)
- John K. Jenkins, Sr. (2020–present)

== President (called "Executive Director" or "General Director" until 1992) ==
- J. Elwin Wright (1942–47)
- Rutherford L. Decker (1948–53)
- George L. Ford (1954–64)
- Clyde W. Taylor (1964–74)
- Arthur M. Climenhaga (1964–67)
- Billy A. Melvin (1967–95)
- Don Argue (1992–98)
- Kevin Mannoia (1999–2001)
- Leith Anderson (2002–03)
- Ted Haggard (2003–06)
- Leith Anderson (2006–19)
- Walter Kim (2020–present)

== Bibliography ==
- Harold Lindsell, Park Street Prophet: The Life of Harold John Ockenga (Wheaton: Van Kampen, 1951).
- George Marsden, Reforming Fundamentalism: Fuller Seminary and the New Evangelicalism (Grand Rapids: William B. Eerdmans, 1987).
- James DeForest Murch, Cooperation without Compromise: A History of the National Association of Evangelicals (Grand Rapids: William B. Eerdmans, 1956).
- Ronald J. Sider & Dianne Knippers, ed., Toward an Evangelical Public Policy (Grand Rapids: Baker Books, 2005).
- John G. Stackhouse, Jr., "The National Association of Evangelicals, the Evangelical Fellowship of Canada, and the Limits of Evangelical Cooperation," Christian Scholar's Review 25 (December 1995): 157–179.
- Sutton, Matthew Avery. American Apocalypse: A history of modern evangelicalism (2014)
