= Football Association of the Czech Republic =

Sports governing body in the Czech Republic

UEFA
- Founded: 19 October 1901
- Headquarters: Prague
- FIFA affiliation: 1907–1908 (as Bohemia), 1994–present
- UEFA affiliation: 15 June 1954; 72 years ago (as Czechoslovakia); 1 January 1993; 33 years ago (current form)
- President: David Trunda
- Website: facr.fotbal.cz

The Football Association of the Czech Republic (Czech: Fotbalová asociace České republiky; FAČR), or colloquially the Czech Football Association, is the governing body of association football in the Czech Republic based in Prague. It organizes the lower-level league competitions in the country and Czech Cup. On the other hand, the professional Czech First League and Czech Second League are organized independently.

== History ==
The first predecessor was established as Bohemian Football Union on 19 October 1901 in Austro-Hungarian constituency Kingdom of Bohemia. From 1922 to 1993, during the existence of Czechoslovakia, the association was known as the Czechoslovak Football Association (Czech: Československá asociace fotbalová; ČSAF) and controlled the Czechoslovakia national football team. After the partition of Czechoslovakia the association took the name Bohemian-Moravian Football Federation (Czech: Českomoravský fotbalový svaz; ČMFS) until June 2011.

On 3 May 2017, Police of the Czech Republic raided the headquarters of the association and other institutions in connection with the redistribution of state subsidies by the Ministry of Education for 2017. Chairman of the association, Miroslav Pelta, was arrested during the event. Another raid on the association's headquarters took place on 16 October 2020, with 20 people detained, including vice-chairman Roman Berbr.

Petr Fousek has served as chairman of the association since 2021, been elected at the 23rd general meeting held on 3 June after defeating Karel Poborský by 15 votes.

David Trunda has served as chairman of the association since 2025, been elected at the general meeting held on 29 May.

== Structure ==
No.	President	Tenure
Bohemian Football Union
1	Karel Freja	1901–1903
2	Vilém Heinz-Henry	1903
3	V. J. Kapr	1903–1905
4	Otakar Petřík	1905
5	Miroslav Horáček	1905–1909
6	Josef Šikl	1909–1910
7	Otakar Petřík	1910
8	Josef Fikl	1910–1911
9	Stanislav Práchenský	1911
10	Karel Bukovský	1911–1914
11	Ludvík Dyk	1914–1919
12	Jindřich Kamenický	1919

No.	President	Tenure
Bohemian–Moravian Football Federation
1	František Chvalovský	1993–2001
2	Jan Obst	2001–2005
3	Pavel Mokrý	2005–2009
4	Ivan Hašek	2009–2011
Football Association of the Czech Republic
5	Miroslav Pelta	2011–2017
6	Martin Malík	2017–2021
7	Petr Fousek	2021–2025
8	David Trunda	2025–present

== Competitions ==
- Czech First League
- Czech Second League
- Czech Women's First League
- Czech Cup
- Czech Supercup
- Czech Women's Cup

== Divisions ==
- Czech Republic national football team
- Czech Republic women's national football team
- Czech Republic women's national under-19 football team
- Czech Republic women's national under-17 football team
- National under-21 football team
- National under-19 football team
- National under-18 football team
- National under-17 football team

== Sponsors ==
=== Current ===
- Fortuna
- Penny
- Adidas
- Czech Inn Hotels
- Ford Motor Company
- MOL
- Coca-Cola
- Staropramen Brewery
- ČSOB
- CSBeton
- 11 Team Sports
- Digel
- Centropol
- Vinofol
- Denik.cz
- Protecton
- BigBoard
- Czech Television
- Impuls
- AAA Auto
- Steilmann
- Alexandria

=== Previous ===
- Gambrinus
- Čedok
- Office to Go
- CEFC China Energy
- SYNOT
- Česká spořitelna
- John Deere
- Česká pošta
- Puma
- Rauch
- Inkospor
- ČPP
- TV Nova
- Sazkatip
- Hat Trick
- Conotoxia
- Hörmann
- Chance
- Sportisimo
- ING Group
- TCL Technology
- Hyundai Motor Company
- G4S
- PlayStation
- Isostar
- Pepsi
- Goodyear
- Soudal

== See also ==
- Slovak Football Association
