= Laith =

Laith is a name that is an Arabic epithet for "lion". It also comes from a variant in Scottish from Leith, a placename element from Scottish Gaelic laith meaning "liquid", likely borrowed from Proto-Brythonic *lleɨθ "moist". See Water of Leith. Notable people with the name include:

== Given name ==
- Abu Laith al-Libi (1967–2008), senior leader of Al-Qaeda in Afghanistan
- Laith Ashley (born 1989), American model, actor, activist and entertainer
- Laith al-Balous (born 1996/97), Syrian Druze leader
- Laith Al-Bashtawi (born 1994), Jordanian footballer
- Laith Al-Deen (born 1972), Iraqi-German musician
- Laith Hussein (born 1968), Iraqi footballer
- Laith Al-Juneidi (born 1978), Palestinian film director and producer
- Laith Nakli (born 1969), British-Syrian-American actor and producer
- Laith Nobari (born 1977), Iraq-born Iranian footballer
- Laith Pharaon (born 1968), entrepreneur and motorboat racer
- Laith Abu Rahal (born 2001), Jordanian footballer
- Laith Al-Saadi (born 1977), American blues musician
- Laith Shubbar (born 1967), Iraqi academic and politician
- Laith Shubeilat (1942–2022), Jordanian politician
- Laith Wallschleger (born 1992), American football player, actor and stuntman
- Layth Abdulamir (born 1957), Iraqi-French film director
- Layth Kharoub (born 1991), Palestinian footballer
- Al-Layth ibn Sa'd (713–791), Egyptian imam and jurist
- Layth ibn Tarif, 8th-century freedman commander and governor for the Abbasid Caliphate
