= Basma Alawee =

Iraqi-American refugee advocate in Jacksonville, Florida

- Born: Baghdad, Iraq
- Citizenship: United States
- Occupation: Engineer
- Organization: We Are All America
- Known for: Refugee activism

Basma Alawee is an Iraq-born, Florida-based activist on refugee issues.

She fled, with her family, from Baghdad to Jacksonville, Florida in 2010 after threats on their lives. In USA she co-founded WeaveTales and helped set up the Iraqi Family Organization.

She won an EVE Award in 2020.

== Early life ==
Alawee was born in Baghdad, during the Iran-Iraq War, where she studied engineering.

== Move to USA ==
After her husband took a job with a US-run organization, their lives were threatened. In 2010, Alawee and her husband moved as refugees to Jacksonville, Florida under the Special Immigrant Visa.

== Career ==
While in Iraq, Alawee worked at the national Department of Oil.

Upon arrival in USA at first volunteered at Lutheran Social Services, at World Relief and other Catholic Charities doing interpretation and other refugee-support work. Later, she was hired by Alden Road Exceptional Student Center as a teacher before moving to The Foundation Academy to teach science and mathematics.

In 2013 Alawee became the Florida delegate for the Refugee Congress.

In 2018 she became the inaugural Organizer for the Florida Immigrant Coalition. In 2019, she co-founded for not-for-profit WeaveTales and was a key part of the founding of the Iraqi Family Organization, an entity that helps Arabs teach each other.

In 2021, she campaigned for Americans to welcome Afghan refugees after the Taliban takeover, and invited others to organize support for refugees.

In 2020, she won an EVE award. She currently works as the national campaign manager for campaign organization We Are All America.

== Family ==
Alawee's husband is Ali Aljubouri, and they have two daughters, Dana, and Rodina.
