= Eppendorf =

Eppendorf can refer to:

- Eppendorf, Saxony, a German town in the Freiberg district in Saxony
- Eppendorf, Hamburg, a quarter of Hamburg
- Eppendorf, Bochum, a quarter of Bochum
- Eppendorf (company), a biotechnology company in Eppendorf, Hamburg
- Microcentrifuge tubes, some laboratory tubes also known as Eppendorf tubes, named after the company
