= Northwest University (Kirkland, Washington) =

Christian university in Kirkland, Washington, US

- Former names: Northwest Bible Institute (1934–1949); Northwest Bible College (1949–1962); Northwest College of the Assemblies of God (1962–2004)
- Motto: "Jesus First, Jesus Always"
- Type: Private university
- Established: 1934
- Religious affiliation: Assemblies of God
- Academic affiliations: Council for Christian Colleges and Universities
- Endowment: $9.37 million (2025)
- President: Jeremy Johnson
- Provost: Sarah Drivdahl
- Students: 1,561 (Fall 2025)
- Undergraduates: 630 (Fall 2025)
- Postgraduates: 494 (Fall 2022)
- Location: Kirkland, Washington, United States; 47°39′29″N 122°11′32″W
- Campus: 56 acres (23 ha); Suburban
- Colors: Navy Blue & Gold
- Nickname: Eagles
- Sporting affiliations: NAIA – CCC
- Website: northwestu.edu
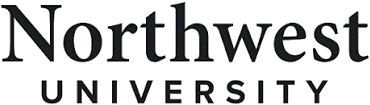

Northwest University is a private Christian university in Kirkland, Washington, United States. The university offers associate, baccalaureate, master's, and doctorate degrees through its College of Arts & Sciences, School of Business and Management, School of Education, Mark and Huldah Buntain School of Nursing, College of Ministry, and College of Social and Behavioral Sciences. It has a satellite campus in Salem, Oregon.

== History ==
=== Early history ===
Northwest was started as a Bible Institute by the Northwest Ministry Network of the Assemblies of God USA and is still operated under the control of the Alaska, Montana, Oregon, Northwest, Southern Idaho, and Wyoming districts of the Assemblies of God.

The idea for starting a Bible institute in the Northwest started in 1928 at an annual meeting of the Northwest District Council of the Assemblies of God. J.S. Secrist, a council member had presented the idea, but it wasn't until the annual meeting in 1933 that his idea was adopted by council members from all of the states in the District.

Meanwhile, a church in Seattle called the Hollywood Temple had invited a young man from Fargo, North Dakota, to be the pastor of the ministry. Henry H. Ness accepted the invitation and moved his family to Seattle the same year. After only a few months, Ness had the impression from God that he should start a Bible school. He approached the Northwest District of the Assemblies of God about starting the institute and offered the Hollywood Temple as the campus. Later that year, Ness became the first president of Northwest Bible Institute and C.C. Beatty became the first dean and instructor. Charles E. Butterfield, and T.S. Sandall, both pastors from the Puget Sound area also taught a couple of times a week. Other staff and faculty included Ruth Morris, an English teacher, Delbert Cox, who taught music, and Christiansen, who volunteered as the dean of students.

In 1949, Ness resigned from his position. After five months of searching for a new president, Charles Butterfield was appointed to the position. Along with the change in leadership came a change in the name of the "Northwest Bible Institute" to "Northwest Bible College". In order to acquire accreditation, Butterfield required the faculty to have degrees or work to obtain them. He also made changes in the structure of the academics and administration so that the new college ran more like an educational institution focused on preparing people for a wide variety of ministries and vocations. By 1952, the Accrediting Association of Bible Colleges gave full accreditation to Northwest Bible College, and the United States Department of Education recognized them as a school of higher learning.

In the early 1950s, the Hollywood Temple had its name changed to Calvary Temple. The college had been expanding as had the church. Even with the acquisition of other buildings for dorms and the building of a new sanctuary for the church, the space was very limited. They started a campus fund in 1952 with $112.41. In 1955, the city of Seattle proposed the new I-5 freeway that would cut through the middle of campus. Butterfield knew that they needed a new place to go. Through many travels and visitations, he came to an old military shipbuilding facility and housing project on the east side of Lake Washington. As he prayed, he felt that God was promising this location as the future campus of Northwest Bible College. He pursued the purchase of the land and structures but was rejected. However, in 1958, the Department of Health, Education and Welfare awarded Northwest Bible College twenty-two and one-thirds acres at no cost. The college purchased an additional 12 acres (49,000 m^{2}) for 30,000 dollars. That summer, construction began and finished with 4 buildings designed by Butterfield's son, Robert. H.J. Secrist, son of J.S. Secrist, volunteered as the construction manager with all other laborers volunteering their time as well. Classes began on September 28, 1959, and within a few years the campus had expanded to women and men's dormitories, a cafeteria, a student center, and a gymnasium.

In 1962, Northwest Bible College was renamed as "Northwest College of the Assemblies of God". At the end of the 1966 school year, D.V. Hurst became the third president of Northwest College. Hurst significantly improved the existing networks established by the Assemblies of God in the Northwest. He began holding info sessions for each district, allowing juniors and seniors to ask questions and meet with their district leaders. He was also the first to produce a hard copy of the policies and procedures of the college in a manual he gave to the faculty.

1984 marked the 50 year anniversary of Northwest. To commemorate this event, the Lay Council presented the school with a 5,000 lb (2,300 kg) Ebenezer Stone of Remembrance as a visible sign of thanks to God for the last 50 years. They presented it on May 27, 1984, the same day that 173 graduates received their degrees bringing the total number of graduates to 3,460. Don Argue, the president of North Central Bible College was the speaker for graduation.

Northwest College also extended a 20-year lease to the Seattle Seahawks team in 1984 on a 12-acre (49,000 m^{2}) plot of undeveloped land on the west side of campus. The Seahawks signed the lease and built 3 fields, a bubble to house the artificial turf field, and a 36,000-square-foot (3,300 m^{2}) office complex. The Seahawks remained at the facilities until 2008 when they moved to a larger facility in Renton, Washington.

After almost 25 years as the president of Northwest College, Hurst decided to retire in the summer of 1990. The board of directors unanimously elected pastor and Superintendent of Assemblies of God Oregon District Dennis A. Davis to be the fourth president of Northwest College. Above all else, Davis was committed to the highest spiritual aspect of the students, saying that "The challenge of the college is to always strengthen the academic programs in response to the mission and purpose of the college and to fulfill that mission and never to detour from it." He invited the students, faculty, and staff to gather on Wednesday mornings for prayer, a tradition that still continues, and offered an open-door policy to the students and declared that Wednesday would be "Student Day in the life of the President."

Northwest College was also invited to join the Christian College Coalition (now the Council for Christian Colleges and Universities) – a large group of Christian schools dedicated to liberal arts education in a Christian light. Joining this consortium of colleges and universities led to the possibilities for students to study for a semester either overseas or at other Christian colleges in the country.

In 1996, Northwest College began offering an adult degree completion program called Leadership Education for Adult Professionals (LEAP). The LEAP program at Northwest enables working adults to attend night classes to receive a degree. Most of the adults in the program qualify for grants and scholarships.

After 8 years as president of Northwest, Dennis A. Davis resigned from his post. Don Argue became the 5th president of Northwest, but he was no stranger to the institution. His father had taken the pastoral role at Hollywood Temple in the late 1940s when Northwest's first president Ness had resigned. Argue grew up around Northwest College and knew many of the people who had attended as well as faculty and staff. He had observed Ness and Butterfield's leadership on campus as well. He said about them, "Both of these former NC presidents were held in high honor in our home. They were men of vision and spiritual leadership. As a boy I felt my life was positively influenced by these men." Argue had also served as president of North Central Bible College for 16 years.

=== Recent history ===
Northwest University announced the opening of the Mark and Huldah Buntain College of Nursing in 1999. Mark and Huldah made a sizeable donation to the school from the organization they founded called Mission of Mercy in Kolkata, India. The School of Nursing offers a Bachelor of Science degree in Nursing and requires the nursing students to spend a month abroad, allowing students to put their skills to good use across the world.

In 2001, the college was authorizes by the Northwest Association of Schools and Colleges (now the Northwest Commission on Colleges and Universities) to offer its first master's degree. By the fall of 2001, Northwest offered the Master of Arts in Counseling Psychology program.

In 2003 Joshua Davey, a Northwest student, took the State of Washington to the United States Supreme court for denying him a state-sponsored scholarship, in Locke v. Davey. The court majority found the state's exclusion from funding theology degrees complied with the Establishment Clause without violating the Free Exercise Clause.

In 2004, the board of directors changed the name of the college from Northwest College to Northwest University. The decision came after significant enrollment growth as well as growth in the academic programs and degrees offered. Soon after, in 2006, Northwest broke ground for the new Health and Sciences Center (HSC) above the Hurst Library. The second floor of the HSC serves as the location for the Mark and Huldah Buntain School of Nursing.

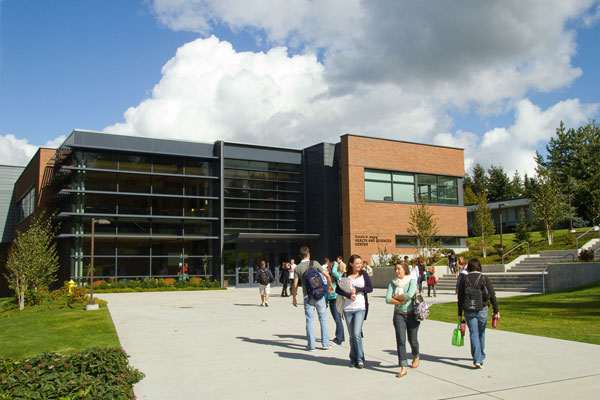
The Donald H. Argue Health and Sciences Center

On August 14, 2007, the General Contractor released the Certificate of Occupancy for the Health and Sciences Center (HSC). The HSC serves as the home for the Mark and Huldah Buntain School of nursing as well as the University Science Department's chemistry, biology, environmental studies, and physics labs. The Northwest University Board of Directors unanimously supported the priority of the funding plan for the HSC, the largest fundraising program attempted by the university. Don Argue, the university president at the time, spearheaded the vision for the HSC. On May 8, 2009, Northwest University formally recognized the former president and current chancellor for his efforts by naming the building The Donald H. Argue Health and Sciences Center. "'The new Health and Sciences Center has surpassed our expectations, and we had very high hopes,' stated Dan Neary, Northwest's Executive Vice President. 'The classrooms and the laboratories have been a tremendous boost to both our science and our nursing programs. But even more, this building has become a popular site for conferences, meetings, and receptions. It has quickly become an integral part of our campus, and it's difficult to even remember what it was like here before the HSC was finished!'" No new buildings or major renovations have taken place since Dr. Argue's departure. Two months later, Joseph Castleberry became the sixth president of Northwest University. The following year, Salem Bible College merged with Northwest University to become Salem Bible College of Northwest University.

In 2013, LEAP was renamed and expanded into the College of Adult and Professional Studies (CAPS). CAPS includes the Adult Evening Program, Church Partnership Program, Criminal Justice Program, Southern Idaho Extension Site, and Online Programs. The Adult Evening Program, Criminal Justice Program, and several extension sites have shrunk or closed.

In 2020, facing declining numbers and a high turnover rate of deans in ministry, Northwest University cut tuition in half for ministry and theology majors. The program has yet to see an increase in numbers. Two years later, after circulating an anti-LGBTQ+ email to faculty and staff and reaffirming their strict lifestyle policies, Northwest University was added to the Campus Pride "Worst List" for LGBTQ+ folks.

=== Presidents ===
- Henry H. Ness: 1934–1949
- C.E. Butterfield: 1949–1966
- D.V. Hurst: 1966–1990
- Dennis A. Davis: 1990–1998
- Don Argue: 1998–2007
- Joseph Castleberry: 2007–2025
- Jeremy Johnson: 2025–Present

== Academics ==
The university awards associate, baccalaureate, graduate, and doctorate degrees. Undergraduate students can choose from more than 50 B.A. programs. The university also offers graduate degrees.

The university is operated under the control of the Alaska, Montana, Oregon, Northwest, Southern Idaho, and Wyoming districts of the Assemblies of God. All these districts are represented on the university's board of directors.

In the 2022 U.S. News & World Report ranking, Northwest University ranked 55th of the Regional Colleges in the Western Region.

=== Schools and colleges ===
- College of Arts, Sciences, and Technology
  - Creation Center for Technology, Media, and Design
- College of Ministry
- College of Professional Studies
  - School of Business
  - School of Education
  - Center for Leadership Studies
- College of Health Sciences
  - Mark and Huldah Buntain School of Nursing
  - School of PA Medicine
- College of Social and Behavioral Sciences

== Athletics ==
Northwest athletics monogram

The Northwest athletic teams are called the Eagles. The university is a member of the National Association of Intercollegiate Athletics (NAIA), primarily competing in the Cascade Collegiate Conference (CCC) since the 1997–98 academic year.

Northwest competes in 11 intercollegiate varsity sports: Men's sports include basketball, cross country, soccer and track & field; while women's sports include basketball, beach volleyball, cross country, soccer, softball, track & field and volleyball.

== Notable alumni ==
- Leanna Crawford, musician
- Natalie Grant, musician
- Brad Klippert, politician
- Cameron Miller, politician
- Phiona Mutesi, chess player
- Kristen Waggoner, lawyer

== See also ==
- List of Northwest University buildings
