= 1960 United States presidential election in Michigan =

- November 8, 1960

All 20 Michigan votes to the Electoral College
- Turnout: 72.7% ▲

| Nominee | John F. Kennedy | Richard Nixon |
| Party | Democratic | Republican |
| Home state | Massachusetts | California |
| Running mate | Lyndon B. Johnson | Henry Cabot Lodge Jr. |
| Electoral vote | 20 | 0 |
| Popular vote | 1,687,269 | 1,620,428 |
| Percentage | 50.85% | 48.84% |
County results
Kennedy
50–60%
60–70%
Nixon
50–60%
60–70%
70–80%
President before election
Dwight D. Eisenhower
Republican
Elected President
John F. Kennedy
Democratic

The 1960 United States presidential election in Michigan took place on November 8, 1960, as part of the 1960 United States presidential election. Voters chose 20 representatives, or electors, to the Electoral College, who voted for president and vice president.

Michigan was won by Senator John F. Kennedy (D–Massachusetts), running with Senator Lyndon B. Johnson, with 50.85% of the popular vote against incumbent Vice President Richard Nixon (R–California), running with former United States Ambassador to the United Nations Henry Cabot Lodge Jr., with 48.84% of the popular vote.

Michigan weighed in for this election as almost 2% more Democratic than the nation-at-large. Kennedy's victory was the first of three consecutive Democratic victories in the state, as Michigan would not vote Republican again until Nixon won the state in his re-election bid in 1972.

== Results ==
1960 United States presidential election in Michigan
| Party | Candidate | Votes | % |
|---|---|---|---|
| Democratic | John F. Kennedy | 1,687,269 | 50.85% |
| Republican | Richard Nixon | 1,620,428 | 48.84% |
| Socialist Workers | Farrell Dobbs | 4,347 | 0.13% |
| Prohibition | Rutherford Decker | 2,029 | 0.06% |
| Tax Cut | Lars Daly | 1,767 | 0.05% |
| Socialist Labor | Eric Hass | 1,718 | 0.05% |
| Independent American | Unpledged | 539 | 0.02% |
| Total votes | | 3,318,097 | 100.00% |

=== Results by county ===
| County | John F. Kennedy Democratic | | Richard Nixon Republican | | Farrell Dobbs Socialist Workers | | Rutherford Decker Prohibition | | All Others Various | | Margin | | Total votes cast |
| County | # | % | # | % | # | % | # | % | # | % | # | % | Total votes cast |
|---|---|---|---|---|---|---|---|---|---|---|---|---|---|
| Alcona | 1,038 | 33.49% | 2,053 | 66.25% | 2 | 0.06% | 3 | 0.10% | 3 | 0.10% | -1,015 | -32.76% | 3,099 |
| Alger | 2,321 | 58.17% | 1,663 | 41.68% | 4 | 0.10% | 2 | 0.05% | 0 | 0.00% | 658 | 16.49% | 3,990 |
| Allegan | 6,752 | 28.77% | 16,660 | 70.98% | 17 | 0.07% | 24 | 0.10% | 19 | 0.08% | -9,908 | -42.21% | 23,472 |
| Alpena | 5,071 | 43.52% | 6,573 | 56.41% | 4 | 0.03% | 1 | 0.01% | 4 | 0.03% | -1,502 | -12.89% | 11,653 |
| Antrim | 1,647 | 32.60% | 3,398 | 67.26% | 2 | 0.04% | 3 | 0.06% | 2 | 0.04% | -1,751 | -34.66% | 5,052 |
| Arenac | 1,888 | 44.42% | 2,352 | 55.34% | 5 | 0.12% | 3 | 0.07% | 2 | 0.05% | -464 | -10.92% | 4,250 |
| Baraga | 1,964 | 51.20% | 1,861 | 48.51% | 8 | 0.21% | 1 | 0.03% | 2 | 0.05% | 103 | 2.69% | 3,836 |
| Barry | 4,406 | 32.00% | 9,298 | 67.54% | 11 | 0.08% | 39 | 0.28% | 13 | 0.09% | -4,892 | -35.54% | 13,767 |
| Bay | 22,998 | 52.26% | 20,909 | 47.51% | 49 | 0.11% | 21 | 0.05% | 34 | 0.08% | 2,089 | 4.75% | 44,011 |
| Benzie | 1,306 | 34.41% | 2,484 | 65.45% | 1 | 0.03% | 4 | 0.11% | 0 | 0.00% | -1,178 | -31.04% | 3,795 |
| Berrien | 23,837 | 38.76% | 37,425 | 60.85% | 84 | 0.14% | 71 | 0.12% | 89 | 0.14% | -13,588 | -22.09% | 61,506 |
| Branch | 4,759 | 35.03% | 8,752 | 64.41% | 22 | 0.16% | 42 | 0.31% | 12 | 0.09% | -3,993 | -29.38% | 13,587 |
| Calhoun | 23,511 | 42.14% | 32,080 | 57.50% | 97 | 0.17% | 57 | 0.10% | 48 | 0.09% | -8,569 | -15.36% | 55,793 |
| Cass | 6,468 | 42.79% | 8,585 | 56.79% | 24 | 0.16% | 24 | 0.16% | 16 | 0.11% | -2,117 | -14.00% | 15,117 |
| Charlevoix | 2,422 | 37.73% | 3,987 | 62.11% | 1 | 0.02% | 5 | 0.08% | 4 | 0.06% | -1,565 | -24.38% | 6,419 |
| Cheboygan | 2,977 | 43.81% | 3,817 | 56.17% | 2 | 0.03% | 0 | 0.00% | 0 | 0.00% | -840 | -12.36% | 6,796 |
| Chippewa | 5,239 | 44.58% | 6,490 | 55.23% | 12 | 0.10% | 5 | 0.04% | 5 | 0.04% | -1,251 | -10.65% | 11,751 |
| Clare | 1,507 | 29.38% | 3,616 | 70.49% | 2 | 0.04% | 2 | 0.04% | 3 | 0.06% | -2,109 | -41.11% | 5,130 |
| Clinton | 4,822 | 31.99% | 10,227 | 67.85% | 5 | 0.03% | 10 | 0.07% | 8 | 0.05% | -5,405 | -35.86% | 15,072 |
| Crawford | 783 | 34.78% | 1,464 | 65.04% | 4 | 0.18% | 0 | 0.00% | 0 | 0.00% | -681 | -30.26% | 2,251 |
| Delta | 7,924 | 54.98% | 6,460 | 44.82% | 15 | 0.10% | 4 | 0.03% | 10 | 0.07% | 1,464 | 10.16% | 14,413 |
| Dickinson | 6,645 | 55.40% | 5,336 | 44.49% | 9 | 0.08% | 3 | 0.03% | 5 | 0.04% | 1,309 | 10.91% | 11,995 |
| Eaton | 6,912 | 32.68% | 14,163 | 66.97% | 19 | 0.09% | 47 | 0.22% | 8 | 0.04% | -7,251 | -34.29% | 21,149 |
| Emmet | 2,602 | 36.15% | 4,574 | 63.55% | 11 | 0.15% | 7 | 0.10% | 4 | 0.06% | -1,972 | -27.40% | 7,198 |
| Genesee | 72,059 | 48.87% | 74,940 | 50.82% | 212 | 0.14% | 138 | 0.09% | 108 | 0.07% | -2,881 | -1.95% | 147,457 |
| Gladwin | 1,424 | 30.22% | 3,282 | 69.65% | 2 | 0.04% | 4 | 0.08% | 0 | 0.00% | -1,858 | -39.43% | 4,712 |
| Gogebic | 7,200 | 56.88% | 5,429 | 42.89% | 15 | 0.12% | 6 | 0.05% | 9 | 0.07% | 1,771 | 13.99% | 12,659 |
| Grand Traverse | 4,886 | 36.09% | 8,618 | 63.65% | 16 | 0.12% | 9 | 0.07% | 11 | 0.08% | -3,732 | -27.56% | 13,540 |
| Gratiot | 3,859 | 28.10% | 9,854 | 71.75% | 6 | 0.04% | 12 | 0.09% | 3 | 0.02% | -5,995 | -43.65% | 13,734 |
| Hillsdale | 4,069 | 28.38% | 10,208 | 71.19% | 9 | 0.06% | 44 | 0.31% | 10 | 0.07% | -6,139 | -42.81% | 14,340 |
| Houghton | 8,021 | 50.70% | 7,767 | 49.09% | 22 | 0.14% | 2 | 0.01% | 10 | 0.05% | 254 | 1.61% | 15,822 |
| Huron | 5,775 | 37.53% | 9,592 | 62.34% | 12 | 0.08% | 2 | 0.01% | 5 | 0.03% | -3,817 | -24.81% | 15,386 |
| Ingham | 32,043 | 36.87% | 54,655 | 62.89% | 79 | 0.09% | 65 | 0.07% | 65 | 0.07% | -22,612 | -26.02% | 86,907 |
| Ionia | 6,377 | 37.88% | 10,405 | 61.81% | 4 | 0.02% | 40 | 0.24% | 8 | 0.05% | -4,028 | -23.93% | 16,834 |
| Iosco | 2,549 | 37.12% | 4,308 | 62.74% | 3 | 0.04% | 5 | 0.07% | 1 | 0.01% | -1,759 | -25.62% | 6,866 |
| Iron | 5,232 | 57.09% | 3,919 | 42.76% | 7 | 0.08% | 3 | 0.03% | 4 | 0.04% | 1,313 | 14.33% | 9,165 |
| Isabella | 4,431 | 35.92% | 7,880 | 63.88% | 5 | 0.04% | 14 | 0.11% | 5 | 0.04% | -3,449 | -27.96% | 12,335 |
| Jackson | 20,995 | 37.64% | 34,660 | 62.14% | 48 | 0.09% | 41 | 0.07% | 35 | 0.06% | -13,665 | -24.50% | 55,779 |
| Kalamazoo | 24,286 | 36.01% | 42,800 | 63.47% | 122 | 0.18% | 130 | 0.19% | 96 | 0.14% | -18,514 | -27.46% | 67,434 |
| Kalkaska | 693 | 33.99% | 1,341 | 65.77% | 1 | 0.05% | 3 | 0.15% | 1 | 0.05% | -648 | -31.78% | 2,039 |
| Kent | 61,313 | 38.98% | 95,477 | 60.70% | 298 | 0.19% | 97 | 0.06% | 111 | 0.07% | -34,164 | -21.72% | 157,296 |
| Keweenaw | 655 | 48.77% | 684 | 50.93% | 2 | 0.15% | 1 | 0.07% | 1 | 0.07% | -29 | -2.16% | 1,343 |
| Lake | 1,313 | 47.62% | 1,441 | 52.27% | 1 | 0.04% | 1 | 0.04% | 2 | 0.07% | -128 | -4.65% | 2,757 |
| Lapeer | 5,099 | 32.76% | 10,450 | 67.13% | 5 | 0.03% | 5 | 0.03% | 8 | 0.05% | -5,351 | -34.37% | 15,567 |
| Leelanau | 1,810 | 39.82% | 2,730 | 60.05% | 4 | 0.09% | 1 | 0.02% | 2 | 0.04% | -920 | -20.23% | 4,546 |
| Lenawee | 10,785 | 35.11% | 19,859 | 64.65% | 41 | 0.13% | 13 | 0.04% | 21 | 0.07% | -9,074 | -29.54% | 30,719 |
| Livingston | 5,608 | 35.08% | 10,340 | 64.68% | 13 | 0.08% | 13 | 0.08% | 13 | 0.08% | -4,732 | -29.60% | 15,987 |
| Luce | 828 | 35.06% | 1,534 | 64.94% | 0 | 0.00% | 0 | 0.00% | 0 | 0.00% | -706 | -29.88% | 2,362 |
| Mackinac | 2,042 | 39.91% | 3,064 | 59.88% | 7 | 0.14% | 1 | 0.02% | 3 | 0.06% | -1,022 | -19.97% | 5,117 |
| Macomb | 105,681 | 62.83% | 61,989 | 36.86% | 208 | 0.12% | 58 | 0.03% | 259 | 0.15% | 43,692 | 25.97% | 168,195 |
| Manistee | 4,122 | 45.81% | 4,867 | 54.08% | 5 | 0.06% | 3 | 0.03% | 2 | 0.02% | -745 | -8.27% | 8,999 |
| Marquette | 11,177 | 51.00% | 10,690 | 48.77% | 29 | 0.13% | 5 | 0.02% | 16 | 0.07% | 487 | 2.23% | 21,917 |
| Mason | 4,305 | 41.69% | 6,011 | 58.21% | 5 | 0.05% | 1 | 0.01% | 5 | 0.05% | -1,706 | -16.52% | 10,326 |
| Mecosta | 2,380 | 30.90% | 5,306 | 68.88% | 2 | 0.03% | 15 | 0.19% | 0 | 0.00% | -2,926 | -37.98% | 7,703 |
| Menominee | 5,857 | 53.55% | 5,064 | 46.30% | 5 | 0.05% | 6 | 0.05% | 6 | 0.05% | 793 | 7.25% | 10,938 |
| Midland | 6,815 | 32.34% | 14,235 | 67.56% | 11 | 0.05% | 5 | 0.02% | 5 | 0.02% | -7,420 | -35.22% | 21,071 |
| Missaukee | 627 | 19.77% | 2,531 | 79.82% | 1 | 0.03% | 8 | 0.25% | 4 | 0.13% | -1,904 | -60.05% | 3,171 |
| Monroe | 19,684 | 51.23% | 18,607 | 48.43% | 60 | 0.16% | 25 | 0.07% | 47 | 0.12% | 1,077 | 2.80% | 38,423 |
| Montcalm | 4,767 | 32.01% | 10,085 | 67.72% | 12 | 0.08% | 17 | 0.11% | 11 | 0.07% | -5,318 | -35.71% | 14,892 |
| Montmorency | 866 | 35.59% | 1,565 | 64.32% | 1 | 0.04% | 1 | 0.04% | 0 | 0.00% | -699 | -28.73% | 2,433 |
| Muskegon | 28,755 | 46.63% | 32,667 | 52.98% | 92 | 0.15% | 50 | 0.08% | 97 | 0.16% | -3,912 | -6.35% | 61,661 |
| Newaygo | 3,404 | 31.31% | 7,453 | 68.55% | 7 | 0.06% | 2 | 0.02% | 6 | 0.06% | -4,049 | -37.24% | 10,872 |
| Oakland | 135,531 | 45.39% | 162,026 | 54.27% | 512 | 0.17% | 110 | 0.04% | 383 | 0.13% | -26,495 | -8.88% | 298,562 |
| Oceana | 2,651 | 37.43% | 4,418 | 62.38% | 8 | 0.11% | 4 | 0.06% | 1 | 0.01% | -1,767 | -24.95% | 7,082 |
| Ogemaw | 1,867 | 41.11% | 2,664 | 58.65% | 9 | 0.20% | 2 | 0.04% | 0 | 0.00% | -797 | -17.54% | 4,542 |
| Ontonagon | 2,553 | 49.33% | 2,620 | 50.63% | 2 | 0.04% | 0 | 0.00% | 2 | 0.04% | -67 | -1.30% | 5,175 |
| Osceola | 1,378 | 23.50% | 4,477 | 76.33% | 1 | 0.02% | 9 | 0.15% | 0 | 0.00% | -3,099 | -52.83% | 5,865 |
| Oscoda | 458 | 28.03% | 1,174 | 71.85% | 1 | 0.06% | 1 | 0.06% | 1 | 0.06% | -716 | -43.82% | 1,634 |
| Otsego | 1,521 | 43.85% | 1,944 | 56.04% | 1 | 0.03% | 1 | 0.03% | 2 | 0.06% | -423 | -12.19% | 3,469 |
| Ottawa | 10,617 | 24.45% | 32,678 | 75.26% | 66 | 0.15% | 32 | 0.07% | 28 | 0.06% | -22,061 | -50.81% | 43,421 |
| Presque Isle | 2,649 | 47.29% | 2,950 | 52.66% | 2 | 0.04% | 1 | 0.02% | 1 | 0.02% | -301 | -5.37% | 5,602 |
| Roscommon | 1,226 | 30.94% | 2,731 | 68.93% | 4 | 0.10% | 1 | 0.03% | 1 | 0.03% | -1,505 | -37.99% | 3,962 |
| Saginaw | 32,715 | 44.05% | 41,351 | 55.68% | 82 | 0.11% | 56 | 0.08% | 68 | 0.09% | -8,636 | -11.63% | 74,272 |
| Sanilac | 4,153 | 27.35% | 11,005 | 72.47% | 4 | 0.03% | 15 | 0.10% | 8 | 0.05% | -6,852 | -45.12% | 15,185 |
| Schoolcraft | 2,107 | 49.02% | 2,183 | 50.79% | 6 | 0.14% | 1 | 0.02% | 1 | 0.02% | -76 | -1.77% | 4,298 |
| Shiawassee | 8,773 | 38.81% | 13,757 | 60.86% | 31 | 0.14% | 25 | 0.11% | 18 | 0.08% | -4,984 | -22.05% | 22,604 |
| St. Clair | 18,332 | 40.05% | 27,366 | 59.79% | 40 | 0.09% | 14 | 0.03% | 22 | 0.05% | -9,034 | -19.74% | 45,774 |
| St. Joseph | 5,445 | 30.51% | 12,337 | 69.13% | 12 | 0.07% | 38 | 0.21% | 15 | 0.08% | -6,892 | -38.62% | 17,847 |
| Tuscola | 5,357 | 30.95% | 11,931 | 68.93% | 2 | 0.01% | 10 | 0.06% | 8 | 0.05% | -6,574 | -37.98% | 17,308 |
| Van Buren | 7,082 | 35.24% | 12,903 | 64.21% | 42 | 0.21% | 26 | 0.13% | 43 | 0.21% | -5,821 | -28.97% | 20,096 |
| Washtenaw | 25,129 | 38.67% | 39,632 | 60.99% | 85 | 0.13% | 40 | 0.06% | 100 | 0.15% | -14,503 | -22.32% | 64,986 |
| Wayne | 773,327 | 65.99% | 394,485 | 33.66% | 1,665 | 0.14% | 396 | 0.03% | 2,036 | 0.17% | 378,842 | 32.33% | 1,171,909 |
| Wexford | 2,807 | 34.67% | 5,262 | 65.00% | 3 | 0.04% | 19 | 0.23% | 5 | 0.06% | -2,455 | -30.33% | 8,096 |
| Totals | 1,687,269 | 50.85% | 1,620,428 | 48.84% | 4,347 | 0.13% | 2,029 | 0.06% | 4,024 | 0.12% | 66,841 | 2.01% | 3,318,097 |

==== Counties that flipped from Republican to Democratic ====
- Baraga
- Bay
- Delta
- Dickinson
- Gogebic
- Houghton
- Iron
- Marquette
- Menominee
- Monroe

== See also ==
- United States presidential elections in Michigan
