= Paul E. Toms =

American author and pastor (1924–2015)

- Born: May 26, 1924; Bellingham, Washington
- Died: February 7, 2015 (aged 90)
- Education: Bob Jones University
- Alma mater: Fuller Theological Seminary
- Occupations: Author and pastor
- Spouse: Eva Briscoe
- Relatives: Margaret Anne Tew and Paul Elmer Toms, Sr.

Paul E. Toms (May 26, 1924 – February 7, 2015) was an American author and pastor. He was pastor of Park Street Church in Boston, Massachusetts from 1969 to 1989 and also served as president of the National Association of Evangelicals and chairman of World Relief.

Paul Elmer Toms was born in Bellingham, Washington in 1924 to Margaret Anne Tew and Paul Elmer Toms Sr. In 1945, he graduated from Bob Jones University and married Eva Briscoe that same year in Kosciusko, Mississippi. The Toms then moved to Concrete, Washington where he served as pastor of the Presbyterian church. In 1952 Toms received his B.D. from Fuller Theological Seminary. Toms and his wife served as missionaries in Hawaii on the Kona coast from 1952 to 1962 and from 1962 to 1965 they directed Congregational missions in Australia. Toms came to Boston in 1965 to serve as an assistant pastor at Park Street and became senior pastor at Park Street Church in Boston in 1969 when Pastor Harold Ockenga stepped down. Starting in 1975, Toms served as chairman of World Relief for fifteen years and also served as president of the National Association of Evangelicals. After stepping down from Park Street in 1989, Toms was appointed dean of the chapel at Gordon-Conwell Theological Seminary in addition to serving for many years on the Board of Trustees of Gordon Conwell. The "Paul E. and Eva B. Toms Lectureship in Missiology and Global Christianity" at Gordon-Conwell Seminary is named in the Toms' honor.

== Works ==
- The Story of Mokuaikaua Church (1953)
- This land is your land (1975)
- Winning the battles of life: a life-related study of Joshua (1986)
