= Wattenscheid =

Urban district of Bochum, Germany

- Stadtbezirk of Bochum
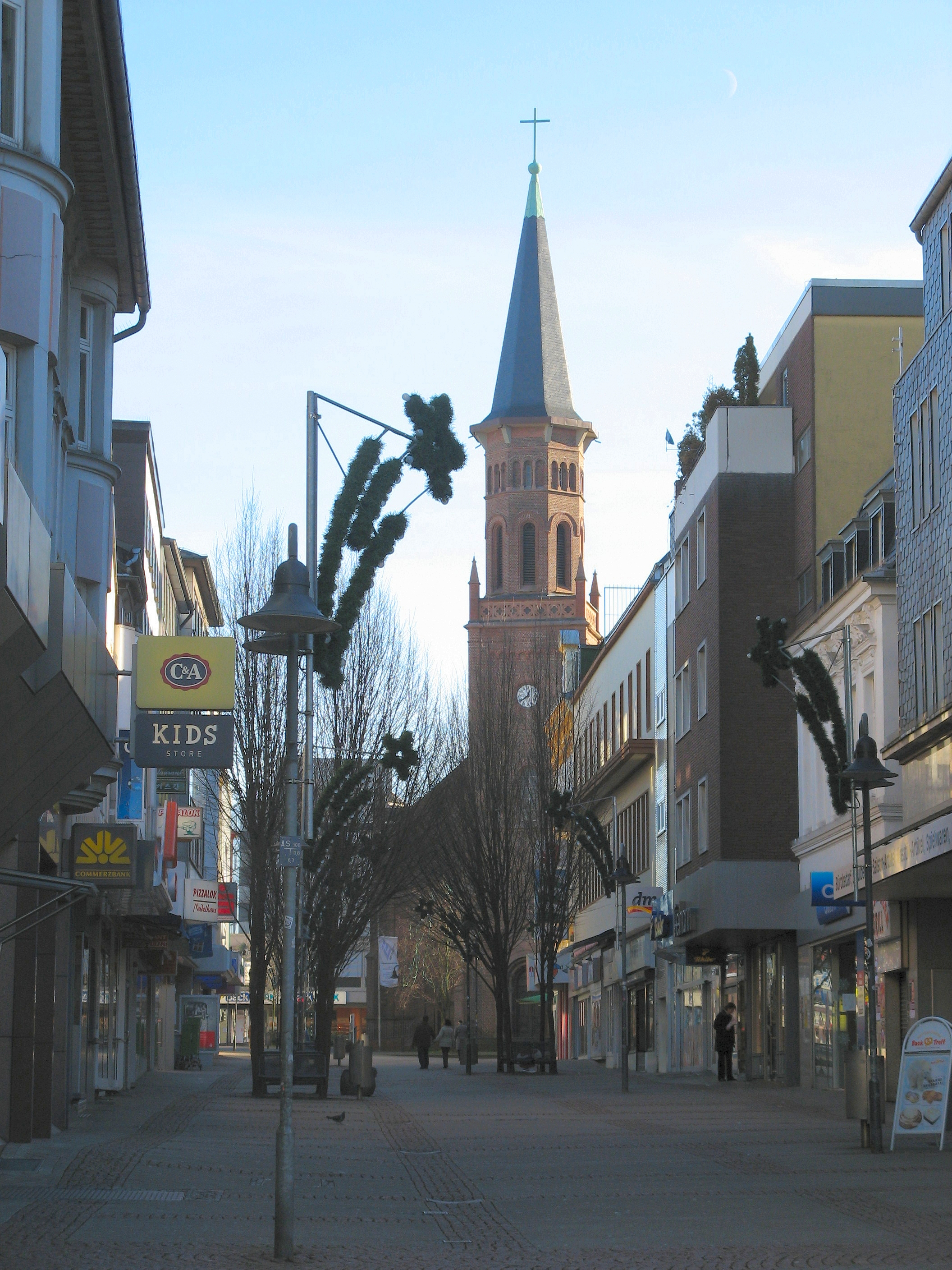
- Wattenscheid street scene
- Interactive map of Wattenscheid
- Coordinates: 51°29′N 7°08′E
- Country: Germany
- State: North Rhine-Westphalia
- City: Bochum

Population (2023)
  - Total: 73,965
- Time zone: UTC+1 (CET)
  - Summer (DST): UTC+2 (CEST)
- Postal codes: 44866–44894
- Dialling code: 02327
- Website: bochum.de

Wattenscheid (German pronunciation: [ˈvatn̩ˌʃaɪ̯t]) is a Stadtbezirk (urban district) of the German city of Bochum, in the Ruhr area of North Rhine-Westphalia. Until its incorporation into Bochum in 1975, Wattenscheid was an independent town with a long history dating back to its first recorded mention in 880. In the Middle Ages, it was a member of the Hanseatic League and later became known as a coal mining center during the industrialization of the Ruhr region. The last local coal mine closed in 1973.

As of 2025, Wattenscheid has about 74,000 inhabitants. It consists of residential areas and historic churches, including St. Gertrud von Brabant. The district also has a strong sporting tradition, serving as the base for the football club SG Wattenscheid 09, the athletics club TV Wattenscheid 01, and the chess club SV Wattenscheid.

== History ==
Wattenscheid is first mentioned in a church document from Werden Abbey (Kloster Werden in Essen) in AD 880, by the name of Villa Uattanscethe. The oldest church in Wattenscheid, St. Gertrud von Brabant, was built in the 9th century.

From 1554, Wattenscheid was a member of the Hanseatic League. During the Thirty Years' War, the area was occupied by Spanish troops, from 1623 to 1629. In 1633, imperial auxiliary troops plundered Wattenscheid, before Hessian and Swedish troops arrived. A fire destroyed the city on 15 September 1635.

Wattenscheid was best known as a coal mining town, with the first mine being built in the 1720s. By the 1840s, there were about twelve mines, with around 580 professional miners. This accelerated the development of the city during the period of industrialization. The last coal mine in Wattenscheid and Bochum (Zeche Hannover) was closed in 1973 and is now part of a museum.

Until 2016, Wattenscheid was home to the fashion group Steilmann, which went bankrupt that year.

== Quarters ==
Wattenscheid is subdivided into nine official Stadtteile (quarters) within the Stadtbezirk Bochum-Wattenscheid. The names and population figures are published by the city of Bochum in its statistical reports.

| Quarter (Stadtteil) | Population (2021) | Notes |
|---|---|---|
| Mitte | 23,306 | Includes Südfeldmark |
| Eppendorf | 12,197 | Residential district with historic core |
| Günnigfeld | 8,918 | Former mining area |
| Höntrop | 14,202 | Known for Lohrheidestadion |
| Leithe | 6,220 | Borders Gelsenkirchen |
| Munscheid | 1,885 | Smallest quarter by population |
| Sevinghausen | 3,426 | Includes hamlet of Stalleicken |
| Südfeldmark | — | Often grouped with Mitte or Günnigfeld |
| Westenfeld | 3,629 | Railway station connects to Essen |
| Total (Bochum-Wattenscheid) | 73,783 | |

== Sports ==
The football club SG Wattenscheid 09 is based in the district. The men's team played in the Bundesliga from 1990 to 1994, while the women's team competed in the Women's Bundesliga during the 2007–08 season.

The athletics club TV Wattenscheid 01 trains at Lohrheidestadion and has produced multiple national and international champions.

The chess club SV Wattenscheid competed in the Chess Bundesliga, the highest division of German team chess, for 16 seasons, until its withdrawal in 2014.

== Gallery ==
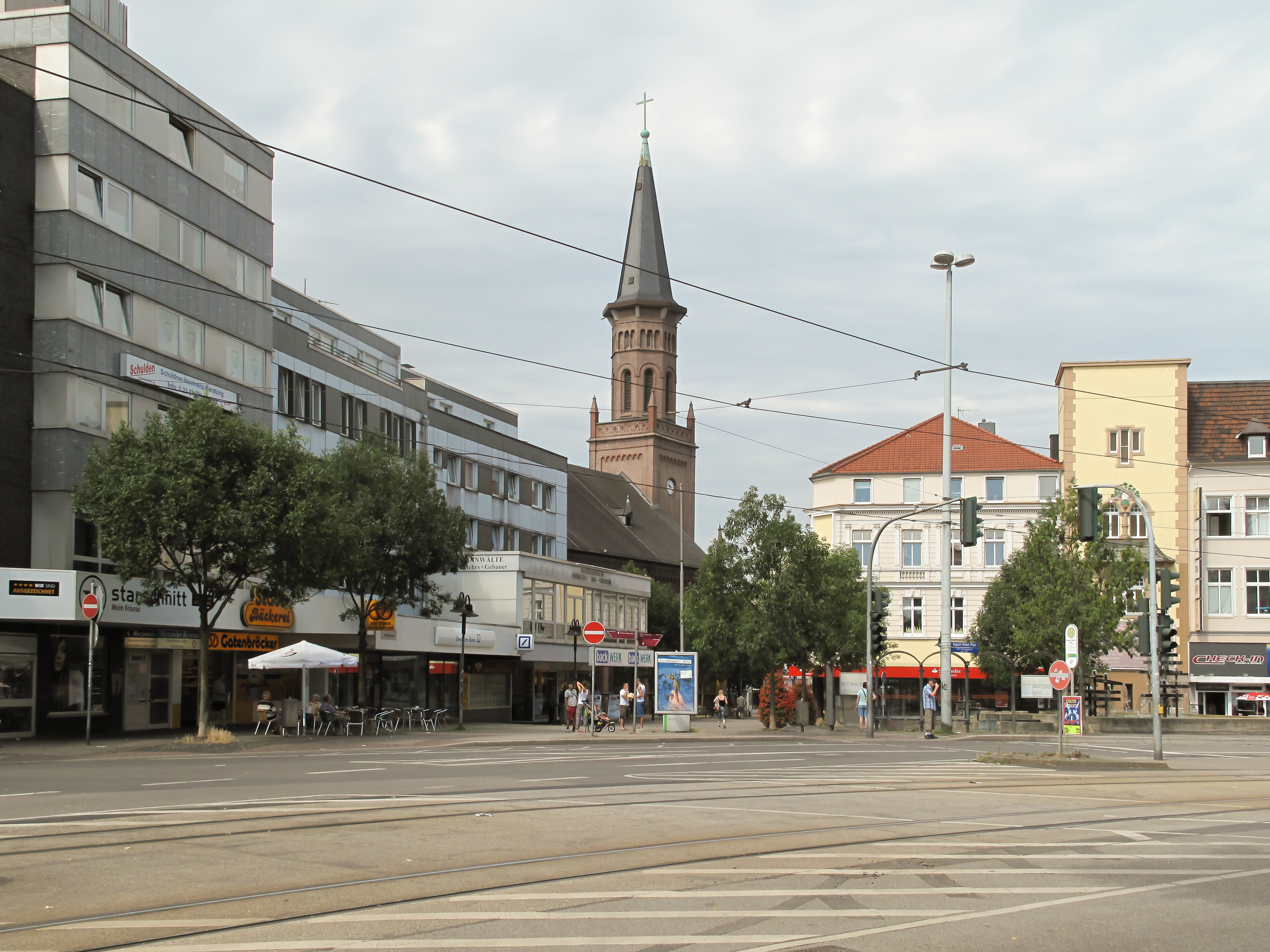
August-Bebel-Platz with Friedenskirche

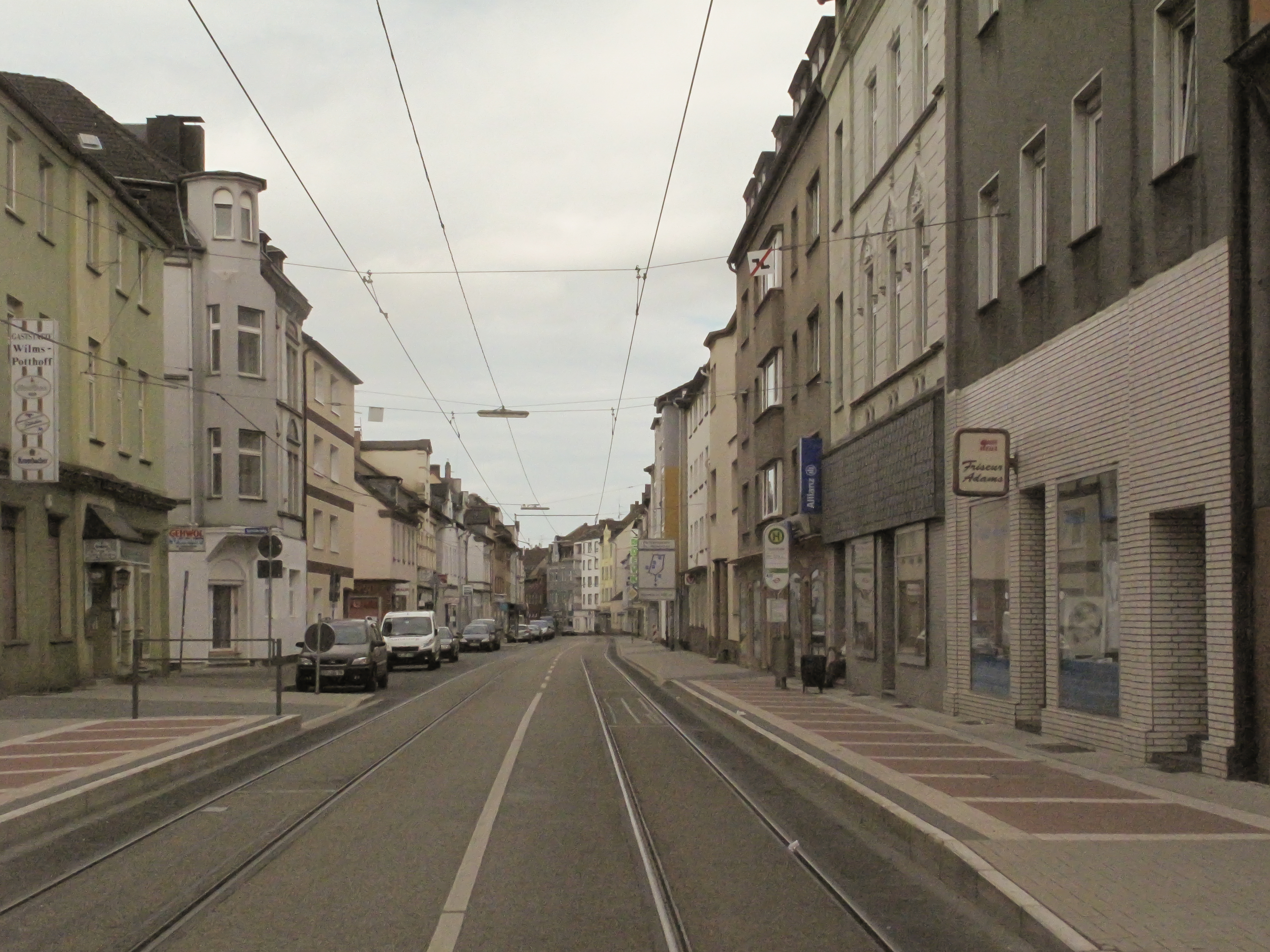
Hochstraße

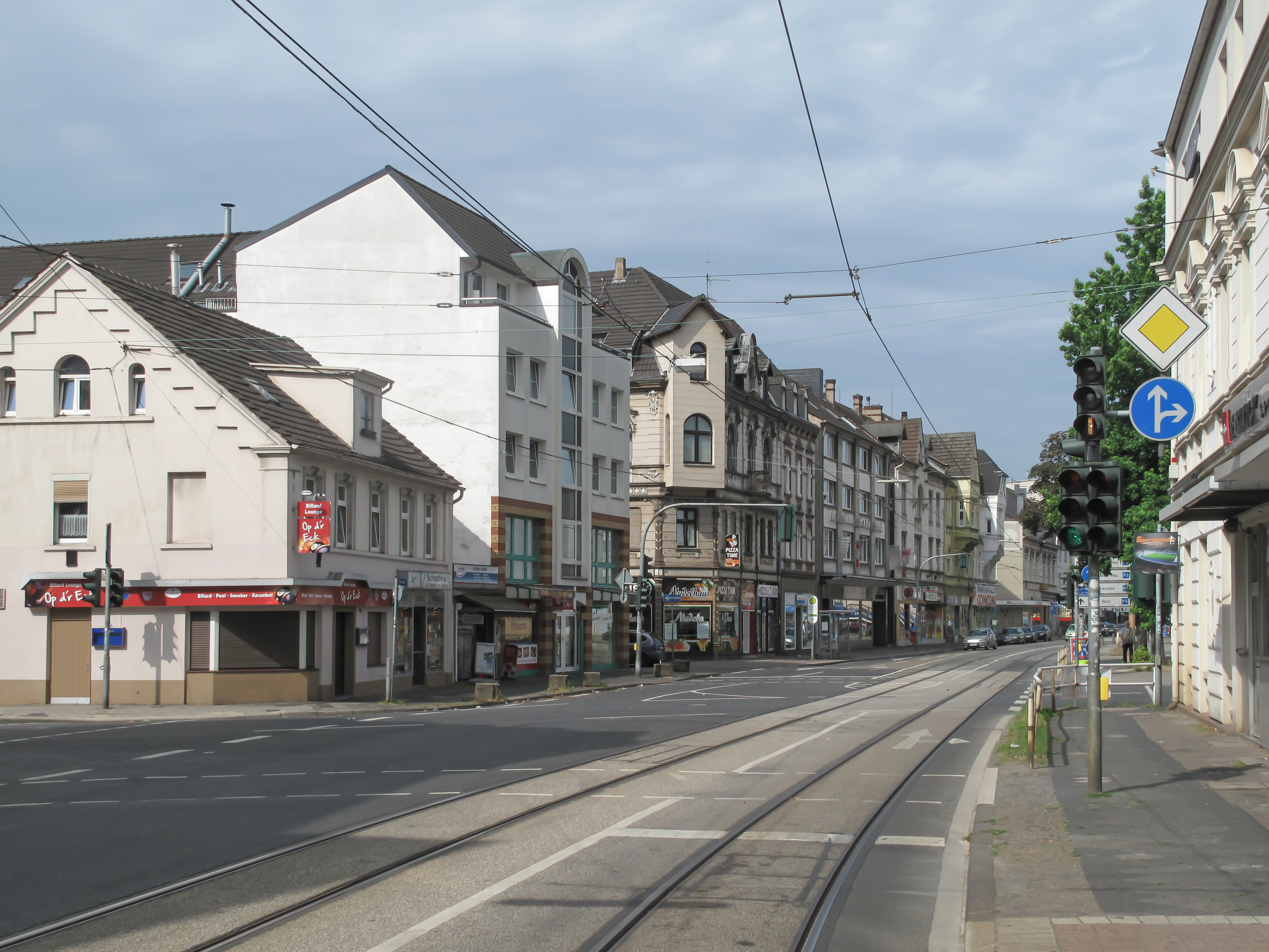
Street view in Wattenscheid

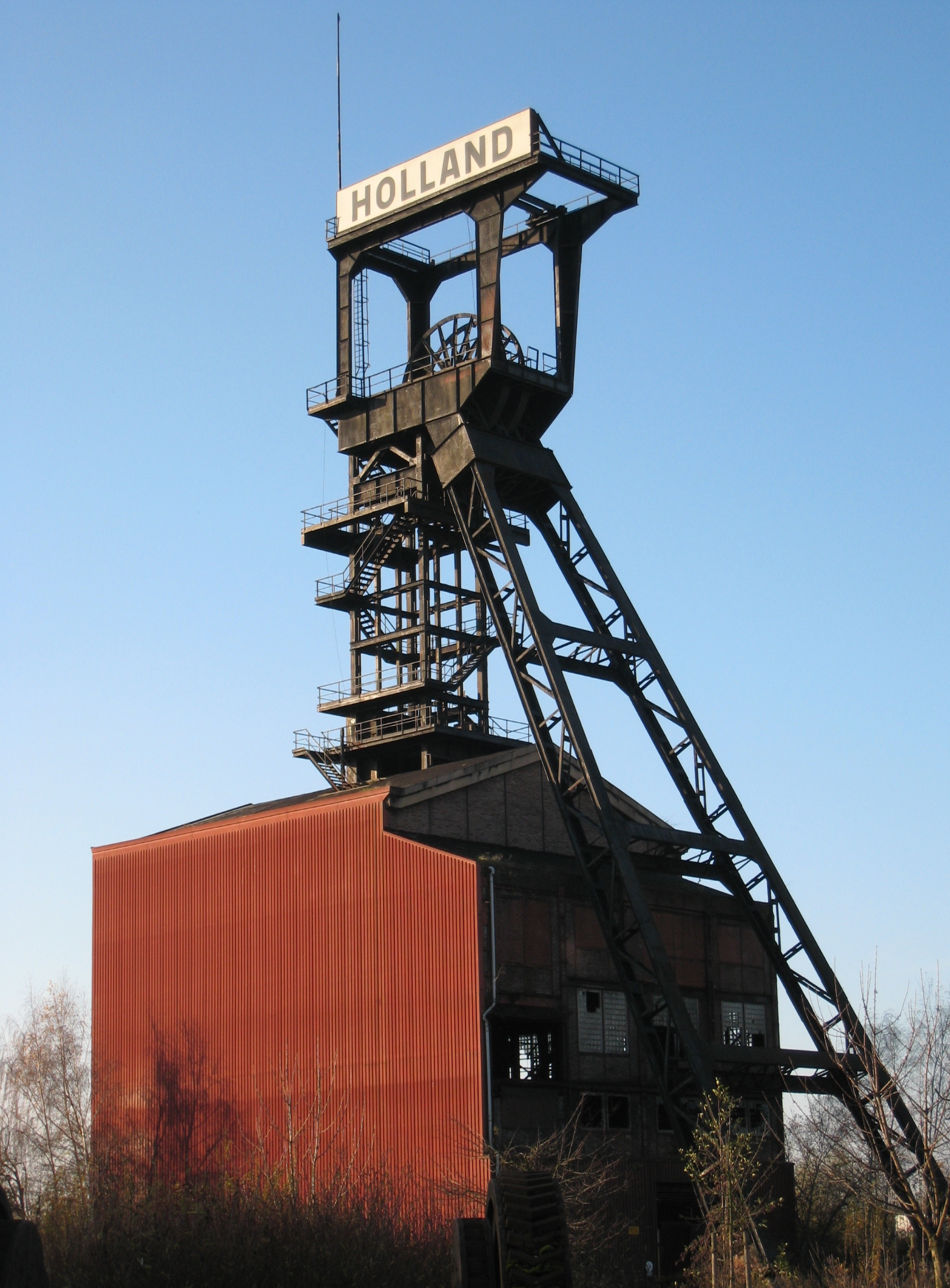
Former coal mining elevator (Zeche Holland)

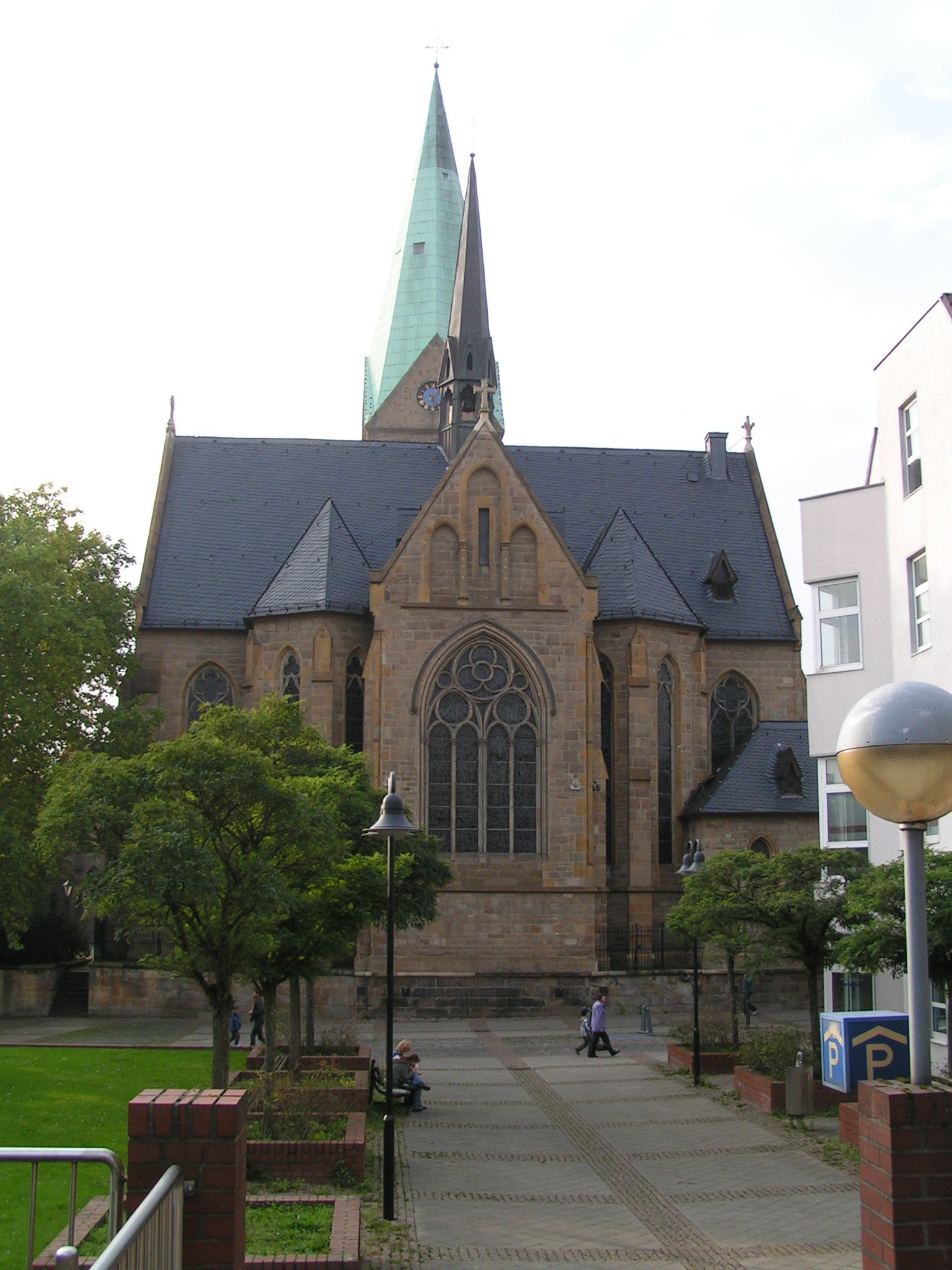
St. Gertrude Church
