= Günnigfeld =

District in Bochum, Germany

Coordinates: 51°29′45″N 7°08′52″E

Günnigfeld is a district of Bochum, a city in the Ruhr area of North Rhine-Westphalia, western Germany. Günnigfeld belongs to the Stadtbezirk (district of a town) of Wattenscheid, Germany, which was a town until 1974 and is now part of Bochum. Günnigfeld is the northernmost part of Wattenscheid.

The population used to speak Westphalian, but now High German is the norm.

It used to be the site of the regional association of the National Democratic Party of Germany, a party of the extreme right and formerly the site of the national headquarters of the NPD's youth organization.

The football team (a fusion between DJK Westfalia and Union 1911) of Günnigfeld, the VfB Günnigfeld, plays in the Bezirksliga. Willi Schulz, Niko Bungert and Mike Terranova started their career in Günnigfeld.
