= Stephen W. Paine =

Stephen William Paine (October 28, 1908 – February 9, 1992) was the president of Houghton College, and the president of the National Association of Evangelicals from 1948 to 1950.

== Biography ==
Paine was the son of Stephen Hugh Paine and Mary Wilfrieda (Fischer) Paine. In 1930, he graduated from Wheaton College. In 1933, he began teaching at Houghton College, became Academic Dean in 1935, and was president from 1937 to 1972. In 1940, he ran on the Prohibition ticket for U.S. Senator from New York. He was President of the National Association of Evangelicals from 1948 to 1950.

He helped translate the New International Version of the Bible.

== Bibliography ==
- Beginning Greek: A Functional Approach (1961)

Preceded by Rutherford Decker	President of the National Association of Evangelicals; 1948–1950	Succeeded by Frederick C. Fowler
