= Gary Dop =

American poet

Gary Dop (born February 2, 1977) is an American poet.

== Biography ==
Dop was born in Fort Campbell, Kentucky, the son of a military father, and moved around a lot. He got a BS degree from North Central University in Minneapolis, Minnesota, and a Master's from University of Nebraska at Kearney, and then an MFA from Nebraska.

Dop was writer in residence for eight years at North Central University. He is currently an assistant professor at Randolph College in Lynchburg, Virginia.

== Literary career ==
Dop has been published in journals such as New Letters, Prairie Schooner, North American Review, and The New York Quarterly. In 2013 Dop was the inaugural winner of the Great Plains Emerging Writer Prize, an award given by South Dakota State University and the Great Plains Writers' Conference to "authors from the broader Great Plains area who have not yet published a book."

His first collection of poetry, Father, Child, Water was published in 2015 by Red Hen Press, and received positive reviews including in New Letters, The Literary Review, and Sugar House Review. The first 1000 volumes sold out in two months, and a reprint of 2000 more copies was announced.
