= Bochum-Westenfeld =

Coordinates: 51.4704°N 7.1494°E

Westenfeld is a part of the former town of Wattenscheid in the Ruhr area in Germany. Westenfeld now belongs to the city of Bochum. Westenfeld has the railway station in Wattenscheid which is most frequented by passengers. Westenfeld is one of the most important areas of the German textile industry. Sevinghausen is a rural part of Wattenscheid not belonging to Westenfeld.
