= Don Argue =

American evangelical

- Born: 1939 (age 85–86)
- Education: Central Bible College; Santa Clara University; University of the Pacific
- Occupation(s): Former president of Northwest University; Ambassador at Large for Convoy of Hope

Don Argue (born 1939) was the president of the National Association of Evangelicals from 1992 to 1998. He also served as the president of North Central University for sixteen years, and of Northwest University for nine years.

== Biography ==
Don Argue graduated from Central Bible College in 1961. He received an M.A. from Santa Clara University in 1967, and an Ed.D. from the University of the Pacific in 1969. He was the director of evangelism for Teen Challenge in New York City, then pastored in San Jose and Morgan Hill.

He served as the president of North Central University for sixteen years. From 1992 to 1998, he served as the president of the National Association of Evangelicals. He was the president of Northwest University from 1998 to 2007. He served as chancellor of Northwest University from 2007 to 2013. Since 2013 he has served as ambassador at Large for Convoy of Hope.

From 2007 to 2012 he served as a commissioner on the United States Commission on International Religious Freedom (USCIRF).

Preceded by B. Edgar Johnson	President of the National Association of Evangelicals; 1992–1998	Succeeded by Kevin W. Mannoia
