= List of Northwest University buildings =

This list of Northwest University buildings catalogs currently-existing structures of Northwest University in Kirkland, Washington. Buildings are listed alphabetically.

== Kirkland ==
Kirkland buildings are listed on the published campus map.

- 6710 Building
- Amundsen Music Center
- Donald H. Argue Health and Sciences Center
- Randall K. Barton Building
- Beatty/Gray Residence Hall
- Butterfield Chapel
- Crowder/Guy/Perks Residence Hall
- Davis Building
- F.I.R.s Apartments
- Greeley Center
- Hurst Library
- Millard Hall
- Ness Building
- Northwest Dining Hall
- Northwest Pavilion
- Pecota Student Center
- Student Housing East
