= Walter Kim =

Korean American evangelical pastor

Walter Kim is a Korean American evangelical pastor and, since January 2020, has been president of the National Association of Evangelicals.

== Biography ==
A child to immigrant parents, Kim completed a B.A. in philosophy and history at Northwestern University, M.Div. at Regent College, and Ph.D. in Near Eastern languages and civilizations at Harvard University in 2007. He is a licensed minister in the Conservative Congregational Christian Conference.

Kim pastored for 15 years at Park Street Church in Boston and four years at Trinity Presbyterian Church in Charlottesville. Since 2013, he has been a member of the board of the National Association of Evangelicals and, in October 2019, was elected as the next president of the organization, commencing January 2020. Kim succeeded Leith Anderson as the first person of color to be president of the evangelical organization.
