= Rutherford Decker =

American politician (1904–1972)

Decker, circa 1963

Rutherford Losey Decker (May 27, 1904 – September 21, 1972) was an American politician who was a longtime member and a Presidential nominee of Prohibition Party in 1960, and the president of the National Association of Evangelicals from 1946 to 1948.

Decker was born in Elmira, New York. He was a missionary at the American Baptist Home Mission Society, and preached in Fort Morgan, Colorado and in Denver, Colorado. He also preached at the Temple Baptist Church in Kansas City, Missouri, until he retired in the 1960s.

A lifelong resident of Missouri, he was nominated for president with party chairman Earle Harold Munn as his running-mate.

Decker and Munn finished fifth with 46,203 (0.07%) votes (and not one electoral vote). Munn succeeded Decker as a presidential nominee in 1964. They appeared on ballots in 11 states: Alabama, Delaware, Michigan, California, Massachusetts, Texas, Tennessee, New Mexico, Kansas, Indiana and Montana. Decker and Munn did not receive over 1% of the vote in any of these states.

He died in September 1972 at the age of 68.

== Electoral history ==
=== United States presidential election, 1960 ===
- John F. Kennedy/Lyndon B. Johnson (D) - 34,226,731 (49.72%) and 303 electoral votes (22 states carried)
- Richard Nixon/Henry Cabot Lodge Jr. (R) - 34,108,157 (49.55%) and 219 electoral votes (26 states carried)
- Harry Byrd/Strom Thurmond/Barry Goldwater (ID) - 15 electoral votes (unpledged electors from Mississippi, half of unpledged electors from Alabama and faithless elector from Oklahoma; Thurmond won 14 electoral votes for V.P., Goldwater one. Byrd all 15 for president)
- Eric Hass/Georgia Cozzini (Socialist Labor) - 47,522 (0.07%)
- Rutherford Decker/Earle Harold Munn (Prohibition) - 46,203 (0.07%)
- Orval E. Faubus/John G. Crommelin (National States' Rights Party) - 44,984 (0.07%)

| Preceded by Leslie Roy Marston | President of the National Association of Evangelicals; 1946–1948 | Succeeded by Stephen W. Paine |

Party political offices
| Preceded by Enoch A. Holtwick | Prohibition Party Presidential nominee 1960 (lost) | Succeeded by Earle Harold Munn |
