= Kevin W. Mannoia =

President of the National Association of Evangelicals
- In office 1999–2001

Personal details
- Born: October 6, 1955 (age 70)
- Education: Roberts Wesleyan College, Trinity Evangelical Divinity School, University of North Texas
- Profession: Minister & Professor of Ministry and Chaplain at Azusa Pacific University
- Website: www.KevinMannoia.com

Kevin W. Mannoia is the Consultant and Pastoral Coach for the Free Methodist Churches in Southern California and has previously served as Pastoral Coach at the Rock Church, San Diego. He is the host of the Anchored and Reaching Podcast and is a Professor of Ministry and formerly the University Chaplain at Azusa Pacific University. He was the President of the National Association of Evangelicals from 1999 to 2001. Prior to this, he served as Bishop of the Free Methodist Denomination overseeing the western U.S. and Asia. In addition to his principal role at Azusa Pacific University, he is Founder and Chair of the Wesleyan Holiness Consortium, a contemporary manifestation of the Holiness movement comprising denominations and institutions sharing a common heritage in the Wesleyan and Holiness tradition. Kevin is the Ambassador and Founding Chair of Aldersgate School of Ministry. He also serves as President of the International Council for Higher Education, an international organization of institutions of higher learning focused upon integrated learning in the Christian tradition.

== Biography ==
The son of missionaries, Mannoia grew up in Sao Paulo, Brazil. He received a Bachelor of Arts from Roberts Wesleyan College and his Masters of Divinity from Trinity Evangelical Divinity School. He obtained a Ph.D. from the University of North Texas.

His pastoral experience began as a church planter, then as a pastor in Dallas Texas. He served as a superintendent for the Free Methodist Church in Texas and then in Southern California. He was subsequently elected as Bishop of the Free Methodist Church overseeing the western U.S. and Asia.

He served as a guest faculty member at Holy Light Theological Seminary in Kaohsiung, Taiwan; the Asian Theological Association; and the Asia Graduate School of Theology in Bangalore, India.

In addition, he served on the Board of Trustees for Roberts Wesleyan College and Northeastern Seminary in Rochester, N.Y., and Seattle Pacific University.

He served as dean of the School of Theology at Azusa Pacific University, coming from his role as President of the National Association of Evangelicals.

He currently serves many local churches and parishes in a consulting role and assists as a board member to various Christian organizations. Dr. Mannoia is also founder and chair of the Wesleyan Holiness Consortium which was founded in 2004 first as a Study Project in the Holiness tradition and then becoming a relational network of churches and organizations committed to relevant holiness in the 21st century. The Wesleyan Holiness Consortium includes Regional Networks of ecclesiastical leaders in metropolitan areas of the U.S. and the world; Affinity Groups composed of leaders with a common focus. These include the WHC Presidents Network, the WHC Chief Academic Officers Network, The WH Women Clergy, the WHC Freedom Network. In addition, Aldersgate Press is the publishing arm of the WHC. Beyond his principal role as Professor and Chaplain at Azusa Pacific University, Mannoia serves as President of the International Council for Higher Education (ICHE) which is an international Swiss organization with operational offices in Bangalore, India. ICHE serves institutions of higher education in restricted parts of the world principally through resourcing and accreditation with a focus on integrated learning with a Christian worldview.

Mannoia's life has come to represent a mix of Kingdom priorities that are traceable to his roots in the Holiness tradition. These are further informed by his work in shaping evangelicalism especially in North America. Though primarily a churchman, he often is found in academic spheres where he brings the practical emphasis of leadership and ecclesiology into integration with the theoretical conversation.

In the late 1990s and early 2000s, Dr. Mannoia's teaching and writing became more focused on the threefold priorities of leadership development, Church mission, and Church unity. These priorities find application and expression in the variety of engagements and roles he plays.

Though his primary role is as Chaplain at Azusa Pacific University, his influence is extended broadly as Chair and Founder of the Wesleyan Holiness Consortium and as President of the International Council for Higher Education. He also serves local churches and parishes as a board member or advisor. These include The Rock Church San Diego, a Catholic parish in Alta Loma, CA, Upland Christian Academy, the Salvation Army's School for Officers Training at Crestmont, and America's Christian Credit Union. He also serves as a member of the Board of Trustees of his undergraduate Alma Mater Roberts Wesleyan College and Northeastern Seminary. His global teaching and consulting extends to universities and churches seeking the input of his emphasis on Holiness, effective leadership, and unity in Church mission.

== Bibliography ==
- The Holiness Manifesto. Grand Rapids: Eerdmans. 2007.
- Church Planting: The Next Generation. Toronto: Clements. 2005.
- Century 21 Church Planting Manual.
- The Integrity Factor: A Journey in Leadership Formation. Vancouver, B.C.: Regent College Publishing. 2006.
- Church 2k – Leading Forward. Precedent Press.
- 15 Characteristics of Effective Pastors. Baker Books.
- Masterful Living: Fresh Vocabulary for the Holy Life (second ed.). Aldersgate Press. 2014.
- Expressing Life: A Primer on Integrating Faith and Learning. Emeth Press. 2023.

Preceded by Don Argue	President of the National Association of Evangelicals; 1999–2001	Succeeded by Leith Anderson
