= Leslie Roy Marston =

Leslie Roy Marston was an American Bishop of the Free Methodist Church of North America, elected in 1935. He also served as President of the National Association of Evangelicals.
