= Wooddale Church =

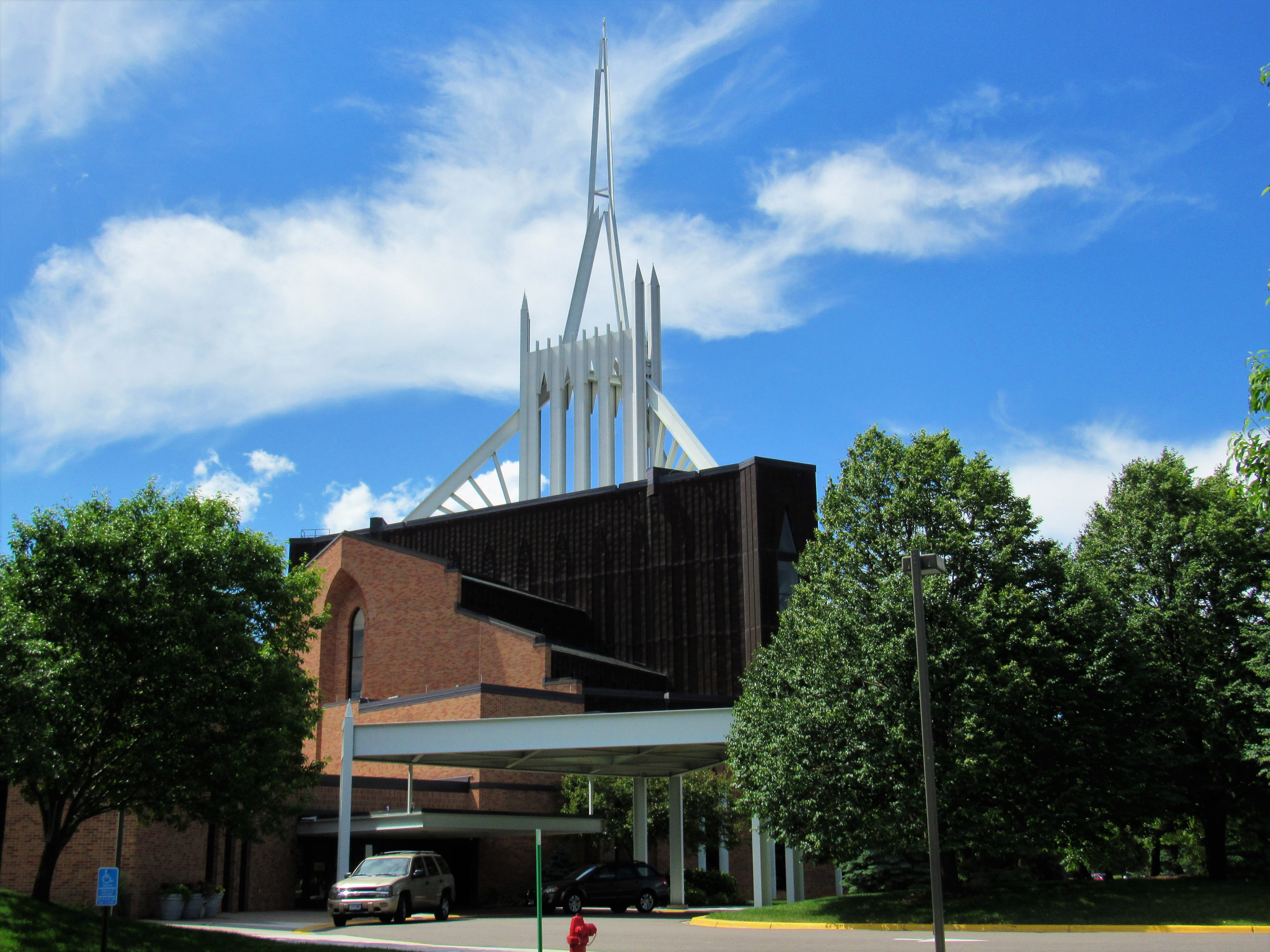
- Wooddale Church, Eden Prairie campus
- Wooddale Church
- 44°52′52″N 93°25′1″W
- Location: Eden Prairie, Minnesota
- Country: United States
- Denomination: Baptist
- Website: www.wooddale.org

History
- Founded: 1943

Wooddale Church is a Baptist multi-site evangelical Christian church located in Eden Prairie, Edina and Minneapolis, Minnesota, United States. It is affiliated with Converge and the Conservative Congregational Christian Conference.

== History ==
Wooddale Church was founded in 1943 at an organizational meeting in a former Minneapolis tavern. That meeting led to a Sunday School and morning and evening church services on April 12, 1943. The original congregation adopted the name “The Wayside Chapel.” Until January 1, 1949 students from the Northwestern Bible School and Bethel College and Seminary actively led the small church.

The congregation adopted the name "The Wayside Chapel," and for the first six years the church was run by students and faculty of Northwestern Bible School and Bethel College and Seminary.

On January 1, 1949, John D. Lundberg became the pastor of the church. During the early part of 1949 the church made plans to reorganize as a Baptist church because of a desire to affiliate with other churches and because of the need for financial assistance. The congregation affiliated itself with the Baptist General Conference.

On June 12, 1949, the church officially became "Wooddale Baptist Church" of Richfield. There were 32 charter members. That same month, the church broke ground for a permanent church building, albeit just a basement, which would be occupied November 13, 1949.

The church continued to grow and by 1954 the Sunday School had grown to an average attendance of 238. This led to further construction of a Christian Education space.

In the fall of 1955, Lundberg left to take a new position in Florida. In April 1955, Paul Thompson became the new pastor. He began his ministry on July 1, 1956. On February 1, 1957, Pastor Paul Thompson died from injuries received in an automobile accident.

In May 1957, Peter Unruh became the senior pastor. Continued growth led to duplicate Sunday morning worship services and plans for construction of new facilities which were ready for use September 13, 1959. In 1962, the church began having duplicate Sunday morning services again and began planning for additional expansion, completed on September 27, 1964.

On January 1, 1977, Leith Anderson began his ministry at Wooddale. Anderson retired as senior pastor on December 31, 2011. During Anderson's tenure, Wooddale expanded in size, relocated from Richfield to Eden Prairie and began multiple styles of worship.

In 2003, the Church joined the Conservative Congregational Christian Conference.

Dale Hummel is the senior pastor of Wooddale as of August 1, 2013.

In 2018, the attendance is 5,500 people.

== Present locations ==
=== Eden Prairie campus ===
In 1981 the church purchased 32 acres (13 ha) of undeveloped land in Eden Prairie, Minnesota, a nine-mile (14 km) move. It was at this time the church was renamed "Wooddale Church". Construction on the new site began in the fall of 1983 was partially occupied in July 1984 and finished and fully occupied in November 1985.

On October 30, 1988 construction started on a new 63,000 sq ft (5,900 m^{2}), 2000-seat worship center, complete with pipe organ and a 199-foot-0.75-inch (60.6743 m) steeple (to avoid the need for a beacon light on the top), and was finished in November 1990.

The continued growth of the Church meant that more space was needed. In 1995, construction began to provide new classrooms for the church’s youth programs and office space for the expanding staff. In March 2000 a 34,600 sq ft (3,210 m^{2}) addition was dedicated.

In the fall of 2000 the worship schedule was expanded to six services each weekend with a contemporary service on Saturday evening, and three contemporary services and two traditional services on Sunday morning. Attendance was soon averaging well over 4,000 each weekend, with about 2,000 children, youth and adults in Sunday School.

As a performance venue for symphony orchestras the hall has been praised for its "bright, warm acoustics.

The campus continues to grow with average weekly worship attendance of approximately 5,000 people.

=== Edina campus ===
On November 16, 2008, Wooddale expanded to a 2nd campus located in Edina, Minnesota. Coincidentally, this campus is located on Wooddale Avenue. Worship services including music, as well as children's programming, are held weekly on the campus.

=== Loring Park campus ===
On March 13, 2016, Wooddale expanded to a 3rd campus, located in Loring Park at the historic Music Box Theatre in downtown Minneapolis. Worship services including contemporary music, teaching, and children's programming are held weekly on the campus. The campus is involved in outreach to the local neighborhood.

=== West Bank campus ===
A 4th location, 7 Corners Coffee, was added to serve students at the University of Minnesota just east of downtown Minneapolis.

== Denominational affiliation ==
Wooddale Church is a member of both Converge and the Conservative Congregational Christian Conference. It is listed as a member congregation on both denomination's websites.
