= North Central University =

Christian university in Minneapolis, Minnesota, US

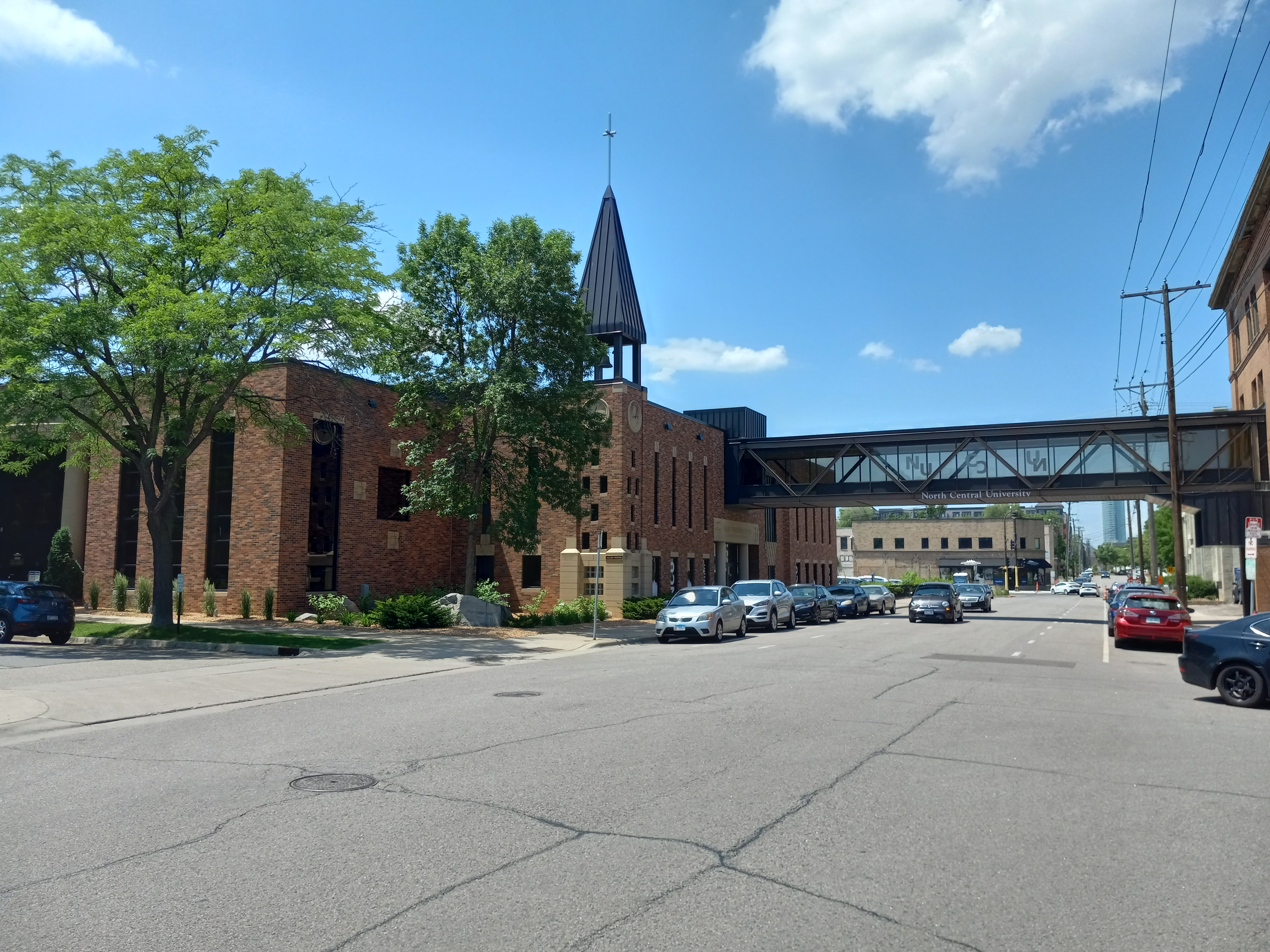
- The university in 2021
- Former names: North Central Bible Institute (1930–1957); North Central Bible College (1957–1998)
- Motto: "Your Life, Our Mission"
- Type: Private university
- Established: 1930
- Religious affiliation: Assemblies of God
- President: Darnell Willams
- Faculty: 130
- Students: 992 (2022)
- Undergraduates: 893
- Postgraduates: 99
- Location: Minneapolis, Minnesota, United States; 44°58′09.58″N 93°15′40.22″W
- Campus: Urban
- Colors: Navy Blue and Vegas Gold
- Nickname: Rams
- Sporting affiliations: NCAA Division III – UMAC
- Mascot: Bama the Rama
- Website: northcentral.edu

North Central University (NCU) is a private Christian university in Minneapolis, Minnesota, United States. It is owned and operated by 11 Assemblies of God districts of the upper Midwest. NCU was founded in 1930 and is accredited by the Higher Learning Commission. It is one of 17 Assemblies of God institutions of higher education in the United States.

== History ==
The university was founded in 1930 as the "North Central Bible Institute" under the ownership of the North Central District Council of the Assemblies of God. After several years of increasing enrollment, the school moved to its current location in Minneapolis in 1936.

The school began to offer four-year degrees in 1955, and became the "North Central Bible College" in 1957.

The college became in a university in 1998, adopting its current name, "North Central University".

=== Presidents ===
- F. J. Lindquist 1930–1961
- G. Raymond Carlson 1961–1969
- Cyril E. Homer 1970–1971
- D. H. Mapson (interim) 1971
- E. M. Clark 1971–1979
- Don Argue 1979–1995
- Gordon Anderson 1995–June 2017
- Scott Hagan June 2017–2023
- Douglas Graham 2023–2025
- Darnell Williams 2025–present

== Academics ==
=== Academic and spiritual requirements ===
All of North Central University's bachelor's programs contain a General Education Core, a Christian Studies Core, and a Major Core, most of which can be earned by completing 124 credits. The Christian Studies Core is a required portion of all bachelor's degrees. Students are also required to attend daily chapel service and can voluntarily attend other methods of spiritual formation, both faculty- and student-led.

=== Student lifestyle ===
Students must agree to a student code of conduct common to many Christian universities. They are prohibited from activities such as alcohol consumption and tobacco use and must adhere to curfew restrictions and other policies designed to help them develop character and maintain a Christian lifestyle. As the school has grown the rules have evolved. Debate over the viability of certain rules continues among both students and employees.

The university has a partial exception to Title IX that allows it to discriminate against LGBT students for religious reasons. Same-sex relationships are forbidden by policy. Several students have been forced to leave the school because they were vocal about LGBT identity or for having gay relationships, even nonsexual ones.

=== Ministry focus ===
While transitioning into a Christian liberal arts university, NCU has retained its ministry focus and Bible college roots. Each major has a Christian Studies core as part of the curriculum.

=== Deaf Studies ===
Established in 1974 by J. David Fleck, the Deaf Studies program offered degrees to deaf students preparing for vocational ministry positions. The program was one of first in the country. It allowed students to practice their ASL skills in daily chapel services or local churches. It has since been terminated and replaced most closely by the ASL Interpreting program.

=== On-campus housing ===
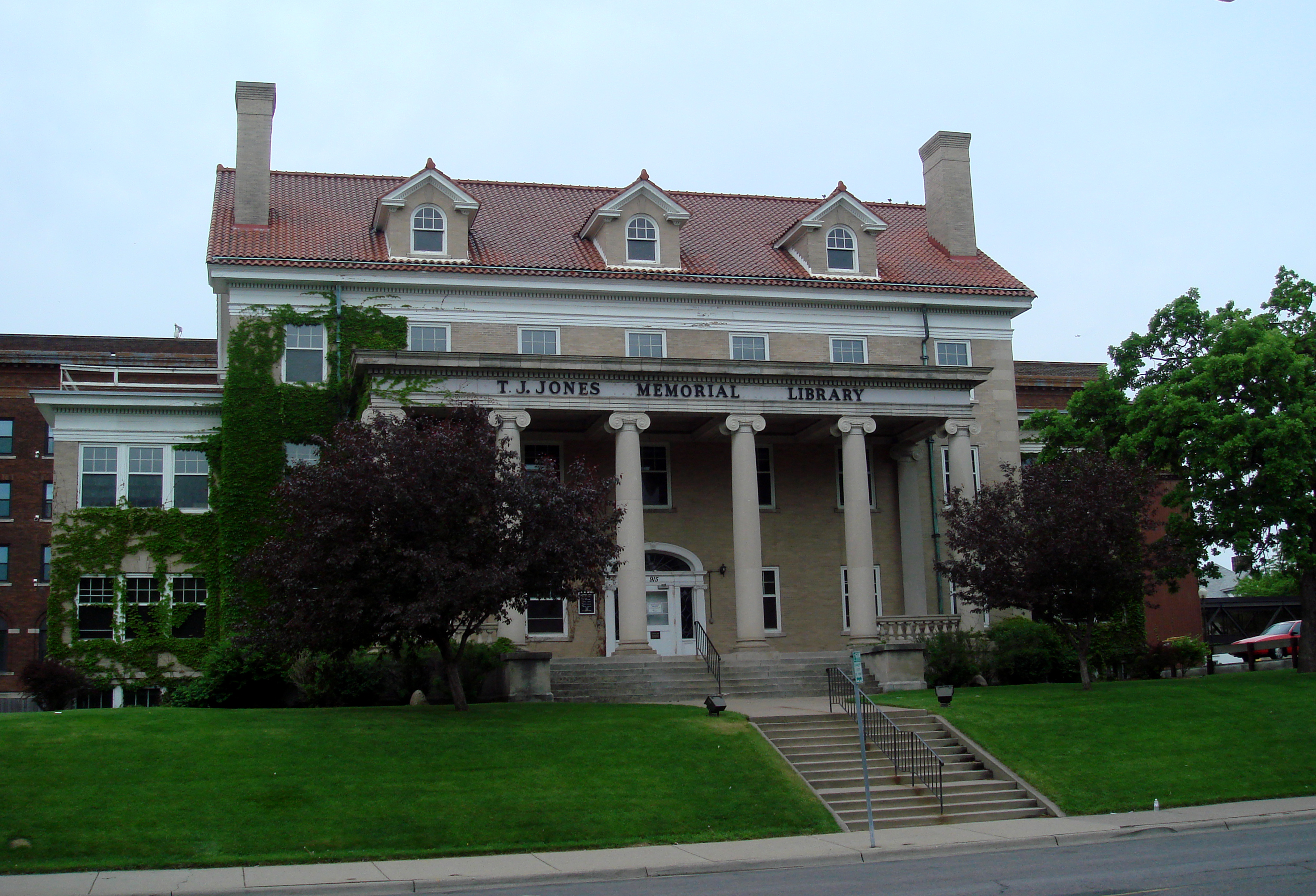
North Central Library

NCU has six different living areas. One of the reserved buildings is the 1500 building. It is right outside the cafeteria and reserved for married couples enrolled at North Central. The 901 building is open to NCU staff. Another exclusive building on campus is the Orfield Apartments. These are right across from the sanctuary and reserved for upperclassmen. And there are three dorms, Phillips Hall, Miller Hall, and Carlson Hall. Phillips is a co-ed suite-style dorm with same-sex floors. Miller is for women and houses 200 students. Carlson is for men and also houses 200.

== Colleges, schools, and departments ==
=== College of Business and Technology ===
- School of Business
- School of Technology

=== College of Church Leadership ===
- School of Biblical and Theological Studies
- School of Global Studies
- School of Pastoral Studies

== Athletics ==
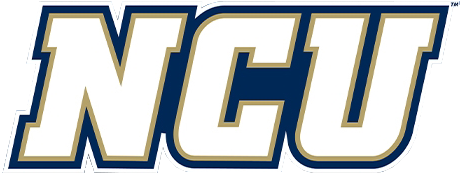
North Central athletics wordmark

The Rams are members of the NCAA Division III intercollegiate teams for men—baseball, basketball, cross country, golf, e-sports, soccer, tennis, and track and field; for women—basketball, cross country, golf, soccer, softball, tennis, track and field, and volleyball. A variety of club and intramural sports are available. The Clark-Danielson College Life Center Gymnasium is the home court for the basketball and volleyball teams. The CLC center was refurbished in late 2016. Partnering with the city of Minneapolis, a full-sized soccer field was completed in 2015. This field is home to the Men and Women's soccer teams. Until 1998, the school's nickname was the "Flames", with black and red the school colors.

During 2012, North Central became an associate member of the Upper Midwest Athletic Conference (UMAC) in all varsity sports. NCU became a full member of the UMAC in 2013. In 2018, the men's soccer team claimed the DII National Christian College Athletic Association (NCCAA) National Championship crown, their overall record was 13–7–2.

In the 2024-25 season, the men's basketball team won its first ever National Christian College Athletic Association (NCCAA) National Championship, with an overall record of 21-10 (the best in program history) and an in-conference record of 10-4. In the 2025-26 season, the team won its second NCCAA National Championship.

== Radio station ==
In 2007, FM radio station KNOF, which broadcast a Full Gospel schedule of programs and southern gospel music, was donated to the university. A partnership was formed between Praise Broadcasting and the university to offer a variety of worship music throughout the day. In 2008, it was announced that the radio station would move to the former Comm Arts building right behind the Trask Worship Center.

In 2014, the university sold KNOF to Praise Broadcasting for $5 million. Praise soon sold the signal to the Pohlad family for $8 million. The Pohlads converted the station into KZGO 95.3 Go, a mix of modern and old-school rap and hip-hop. By July 2021, Praise had repurchased the station and reinstated the KNOF call letters and religious format.

== Notable alumni ==
- Jim Bakker, Evangelist
- Tammy Faye Bakker, Evangelist
- Gary Dop, American poet
- Sara Groves, musician
- Dallas Holm, singer/songwriter
- Mike Kopp, Colorado State Senator
- Jeremy Messersmith, musician
- Jonathan Thulin, singer/songwriter
- Jerome Tang, basketball coach for Kansas State

== Notable faculty ==
- Jeff Deyo, Musician

== See also ==
- List of colleges and universities in Minnesota
