= Eppendorf, Bochum =

Coordinates: 51°27′18″N 7°10′26″E

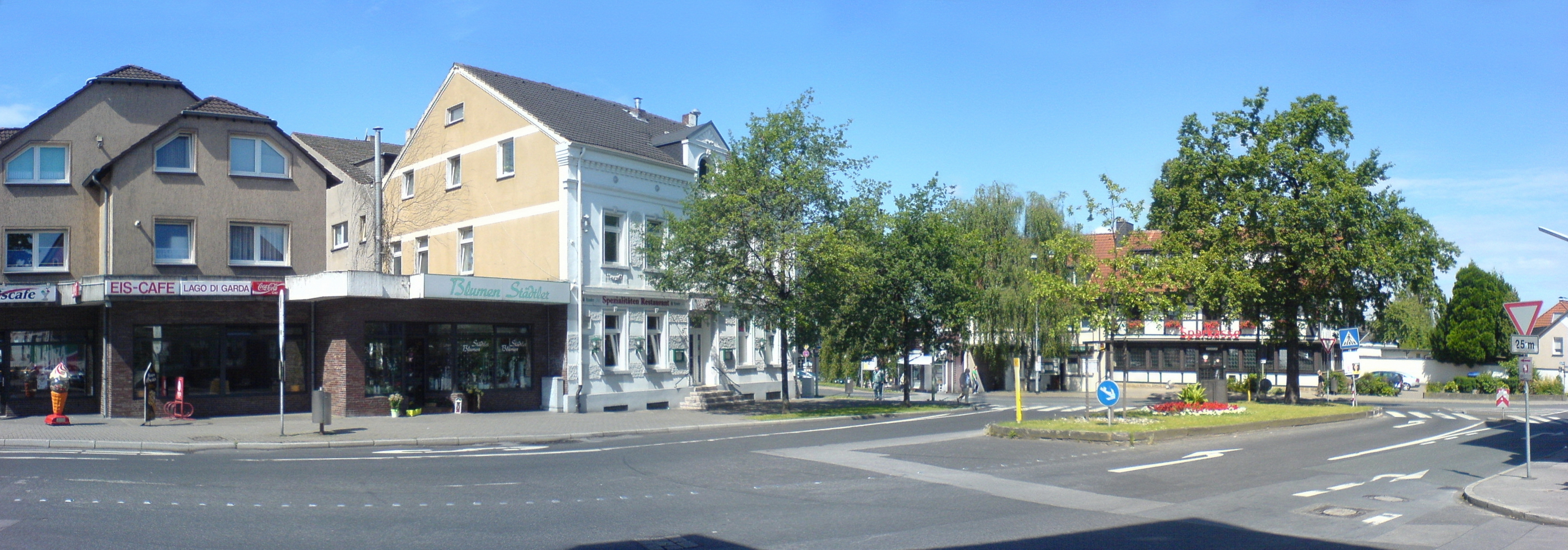
Centre of Eppendorf

Eppendorf (German pronunciation: [ˈɛpn̩dɔʁf]; Westphalian: Eppendörp) is a district of Bochum in the Ruhr area in North Rhine-Westphalia in Germany. It lies between Höntrop and Weitmar. Its population was 9,539 as of 2017.

The population used to speak Westphalian, but now High German languages are the norm. Eppendorf belongs to the Stadtbezirk (district of the town) of Wattenscheid, which was a town until 1974. Eppendorf is the richest part of Wattenscheid.
