= Laith Shubbar =

Politics

- ليث شبر
- Born: February 14, 1967 (age 59); Baghdad, Iraq
- Other name: Laith Issa Talib
- Years active: 2017 - Until Now
- Political party: The Popular Movement for Change and Development

Laith Shubbar is an Iraqi academic and politician. He was an advisor of the Iraqi Prime Minister and opposed to quotas and sectarianism. He earned his doctorate in 1999 and has held many political and media positions.

He has written many articles, research and publications in the fields of politics, economics, culture and sociology. As head of the Energy and Water Development Center, he worked on major national issues such as energy, water and the environment. He actively participated in restoring life to the Iraqi marshes and inscribing them on the World Heritage List.

== Opposition ==
He was known to be an opponent of the Iraqi government, including during the 2019–2021 Iraqi protests. He was among the first to call for the accountability of former Prime Minister Adel Abdul-Mahdi (despite his kinship with him) for his use of force and brutality against peaceful demonstrators.

== Political Party ==
Dr. Laith Shubbar announced in 2020, the establishment of a political party called the Popular Movement for Change and Development. Its purpose is seeking to change the regime, holding the corrupt accountable, and prosecuting those who committed crimes against the Iraqi people.
