= Leith Anderson =

American religious leader

Leith Anderson (October 11, 1944) is an American evangelical Christian leader, author, and retired pastor. Anderson served as senior pastor of Wooddale Church in Eden Prairie, Minnesota from 1977 to 2011. He is pastor emeritus of Wooddale Church and president emeritus of the National Association of Evangelicals.

== Early life and education ==
Leith Anderson is the son of Charles William Anderson and Margery Freeman Anderson.

Anderson graduated from West Essex High School, in North Caldwell, New Jersey; Moody Bible Institute, Chicago, Illinois (diploma); Bradley University, Peoria, Illinois (B.A. in Sociology); Denver Seminary, Denver, Colorado (Master of Divinity); and Fuller Theological Seminary, Pasadena, California (Doctor of Ministry).

== Ministry ==
Anderson served as a pastor a Calvary Church in Longmont, Colorado and was an adjunct professor of pastoral theology and homiletics at Denver Seminary.

In 1977, Anderson began his 35 years as senior pastor of Wooddale Church in suburban Minneapolis. The church was located in Richfield, Minnesota, until 1984 when it moved to a new building on a 33-acre campus in Eden Prairie, Minnesota. Wooddale Church grew to become a congregation of thousands, one of the larger churches in the state and region. While pastoring, Anderson taught in seminaries and released daily radio and television programs. Anderson retired from Wooddale Church in 2011 and was named pastor emeritus.

Anderson served as interim president of the National Association of Evangelicals from 2001 to 2003, and again from 2006 to 2007. He was then named president of the NAE in 2007 and served in that capacity until 2019. As NAE president, Anderson frequently participated in amicus curiae briefs, news conferences, and interviews. Priority was given to issues of immigration policy, climate change and the environment, religious freedom, theology and values, social justice, evangelism, humanitarian services, and cultural influence. In his leadership of the NAE, Anderson was known for avoiding partisan politics, promoting unity within the evangelical movement, and prioritizing racial and ethnic diversity. Anderson has been named president emeritus of the NAE.

In 2011, President Barack Obama named Anderson to the White House Advisory Council on Faith-Based and Neighborhood Partnerships. He became a member of the board of World Vision International in 2018. Anderson has written over 20 books.

== Personal life ==
Anderson and his wife, Charleen, have been married since 1965.

== Bibliography ==
- Making Happiness Happen (1987)
- Mastering Church Management (1991)
- A Church for the 21st Century (1992)
- Who's in Charge: Mastering Ministry (1993)
- The Best Is Yet To Come (1994)
- Winning the Values War in a Changing Culture: Thirteen Distinct Values That Mark a Follower of Jesus Christ (1994)
- When God Says No (1996)
- Dying for Change (1998)
- Praying to the God You Can Trust (1998)
- Leadership That Works: Hope and Direction for Church and Parachurch Leaders in Today's Complex World (2001)
- Becoming Friends With God: A Devotional Invitation to Intimacy With God (2001)
- Jesus: An Intimate Portrait of the Man, His Land, and His People (2006)
- Igniting Worship Series – 40 Days with Jesus: Worship Services and Video Clips on DVD (2006)
- How to Act Like a Christian (2006)
- The Jesus Revolution: Learning from Christ's First Followers (2009)
- Faith Matters (2011)
- The Volunteer Church (2015)
- Faith in the Voting Booth (2016)

== Chapters & contributions ==
- Married to a Pastor's Wife, H.B. London and Neil Wiseman, editors (1993)
- Leadership Handbooks, Jim Berkley, editor (1994)
- Library of Christian Leadership: Empowering Your Church Through Creativity and Changes, Marshall Shelley, editor (1995)
- Leading People, Robert H. Rosen, editor (1996)
- Library of Leadership Development: Renewing Your Church Through Vision and Planning, Marshall Shelley, editor (1997)
- Library of Leadership Development: Growing Your Church Through Training and Motivation, Marshall Shelley, editor (1997)
- Raising Teens While They're Still in Preschool (excerpts), Ron Habermas, author (1998)
- Uncommon Graces (forward), John Vawter, author (1998)
- Vital Church Issues, Roy B. Zuck, editor (Bibliotheca Sacra,1998)
- Global Crossroads, W. Harold Fuller, editor (1998)
- Leadership And Power, Richard Leslie Parrot, editor (2003)
- Giving Ourselves To Prayer, Dan. R. Crawford, compiler (2008)
- Welcoming The Stranger (foreword), Matthew Soerens and Jenny Yang, authors (2009, 2019)
- The Shriver Report, Olivia Morgan and Karen Skelton, editors (2014)
- Religious Freedom, LGBT Rights And Prospects For Common Ground, William H. Eskridge and Robin Fretwell Wilson, editors (2019)

Religious titles
Preceded by Kevin Mannoia	President of the National Association of Evangelicals; 2001–2003	Succeeded by Ted Haggard
Preceded by Ted Haggard	President of the National Association of Evangelicals; 2006–2019	Succeeded by Walter Kim
