= Aspire Network =

Baptist denomination

- Classification: Baptist
- Region: United States
- Origin: 1895
- Congregations: 240
- Official website: aspireleaders.com

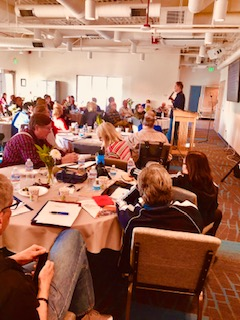
Training at TM's 2020 "Mustard Seed" conference in Dana Point, CA.

The Aspire Network is a Baptist Christian denomination in the United States. The headquarters is in Covina, California.

== History ==
Originally formed in 1895 as the Southern California Baptist Convention, in 1995 it was renamed as American Baptist Churches of the Pacific Southwest. Then in 2006, when the American Baptist Churches of the Pacific Southwest separated from the American Baptist Churches USA due to a disagreement with how ABC USA enforced membership alliances and ordination appointments in light of theological differences and disparity in core tenets of Biblical interpretation, it renamed as Transformation Ministries.

Today there are member Churches in thirteen (13) states and Northern Mexico (Tijuana). Since 2015, TM has established minisitry hubs in Houston, Indianapolis and Miami as part of the expansion of the movement beyond their historical footprint in the American southwest.

According to a census published by the association in 2022, it claimed 240 churches.
