= HMS Leith =

Two ships of the Royal Navy have borne the name HMS Leith, after the historic Scottish port of Leith:

- HMS Leith (1777) was launched in 1744 or 1746 in the British "Plantations", more specifically, the colony of Maryland as the merchant ship Leith. From 1764 to 1777 she traded with Greenland as a whaler. Between 1777 and 1782 she served the Royal Navy as a transport and hired armed naval ship. She was last listed in 1783.
- HMS Leith (U36) was a Grimsby-class sloop launched in 1933 and sold in 1946 into civilian service. She was renamed Byron and Friendship before being acquired by the Royal Danish Navy in 1949 and renamed HDMS Galathea. She was sold for scrap in 1955.

== See also ==
- HM hired armed ship Leith (1793) was a 6-gun ship hired for service in the Royal Navy between 1793 and 1801.
- HM hired armed ship Leith (1804) was a 16-gun ship hired for service in the Royal Navy between 1804 and 1806.
