= Leithe =

Northwestern part of Bochum in Ruhr area, North Rhine-Westphalia, Germany

Coordinates: 51°28′54″N 7°06′40″E

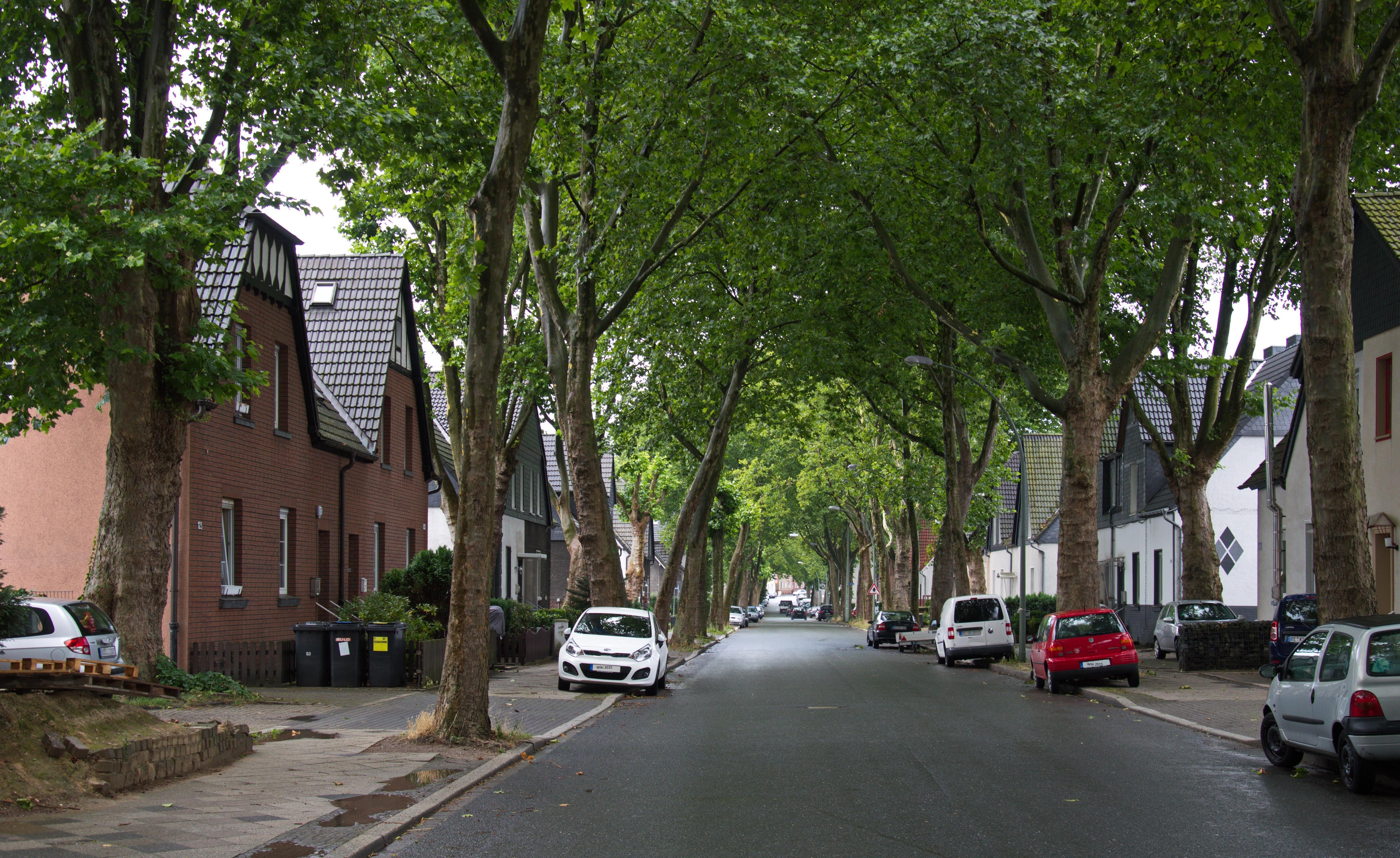
Leithe

Leithe is the northwesternmost part of the city of Bochum in the Ruhr area in North Rhine-Westphalia in Germany. The population used to speak Westphalian, but now standard German is the commonly used language . Leithe borders onto a part of the city of Essen also bearing the name of Leithe. Leithe belongs to the Stadtbezirk (district of the town) of Wattenscheid. When the last census was held in 1987, Leithe had the third highest share of Roman Catholics in Wattenscheid and Bochum overall.
