= Layth Abdulamir =

Iraqi-French filmmaker

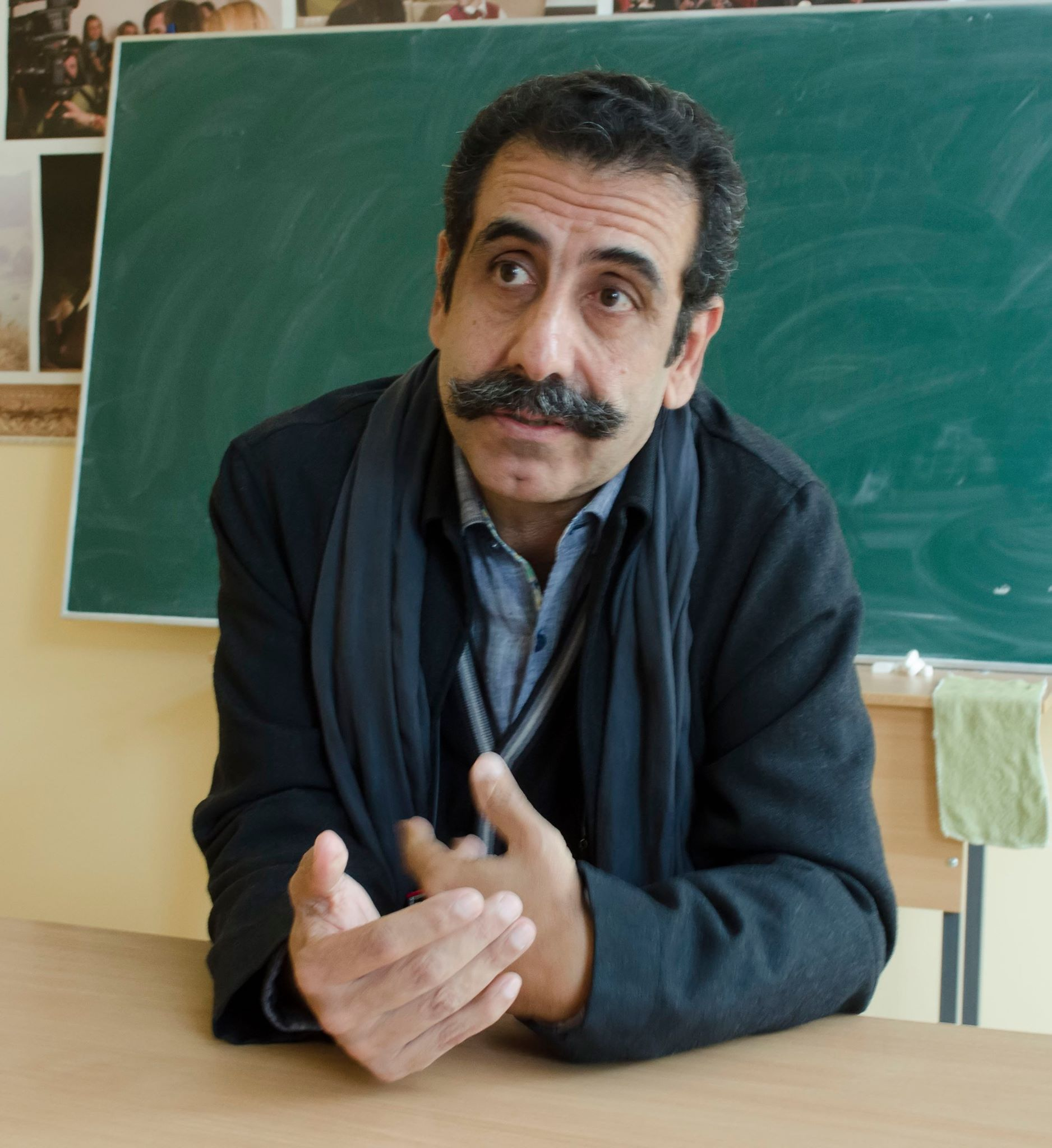
- Born: 24 October 1957 (age 68); Iraq
- Citizenship: Iraq; France
- Education: Sorbonne, Paris, France; Kiev National I. K. Karpenko-Kary Theatre, Cinema and Television University, Kiev, Soviet Union
- Occupations: film director; screenwriter
- Years active: 1982–present
- Known for: Iraq: The Song of the Missing Men; The Executioner's Tear
- Notable work: Yemen, Music from the Heart of Arabia; Christians of Iraq, Chronicles of an Announced Exodus

Layth Abdulamir (born 24 October 1957 in Iraq) is an Iraqi-French filmmaker. He studied film in Paris, France, from 1977 to 1980, and in Kiev (then in the former Soviet Union) from 1980 to 1986. Since 1994, he defended his dissertation at the Rylsky National Academy of Sciences of Ukraine, (Thesis: Characteristics of Extreme Documentary Films Direction). He received his PHD degree in Cinematic Critic he has made several documentary films for various TV channels in France and for Dubai TV in the United Arab Emirates (1999-2004). In 2021, Layth Abdulamir's book Extreme cinema, transcending the borders of aesthetics was published by Arwegh مؤسسة أروقة للدراسات والترجمة والنشر Editions in Cairo.

The book explores the use of extremes in world cinema, the origins and philosophy as well as aesthetic and political ties.

== Biography ==
Layth Abdulamir left Iraq in 1977 to study film at the Sorbonne in Paris, moved to the Soviet Union in 1980, and obtained his MA Degree in 1985 (majoring in film) at the Kiev National I. K. Karpenko-Kary Theatre, Cinema and Television University, He has won a number of International Awards for his films.

Layth Abdulamir has become prominent following the emergence of a new generation of Iraqi filmmakers, in exile or still working in the country, in the late 1990s and early 2000s, a period of cultural and artistic achievements which unveiled other notable names including Abbas Fahdel, Hayder Mousa Daffar, and Zahavi Sanjavi.

In 2005, after 28 years of absence, Layth Abdulamir returned for the first time to Iraq to make the documentary Iraq: The Song of the Missing Men, but he felt like a complete stranger in the country where he was born and the making of the film was rather difficult in a land still plagued by the harsh realities and consequences of the American military post-occupation. In an interview with AlloCiné, the director explained: "Most of the time I had to 'steal' images of reality, I was never able to install myself in a shot, in an interview, and thereby benefit from the time necessary for this type of operation." He added: "Iraqi identity was broken, everyone retreated to hide behind his community, his religion, his religious allegiance."

As of 2014, Layth Abdulamir began working as a film critic for a number of Arabic language newspapers, and also as a Master class instructor.

== Work ==
The book "Extreme cinema, transcending the borders of aesthetics” explores the use of extremes in world cinema, the origins and philosophy as well as aesthetic and political ties.

As a director and screenwriter, Layth Abdulamir made the following films, among others, in a career spanning more than three decades: The Cradle (fiction, 21', 1985) in the former Soviet Union; Yemen, a Time for the Sacred (documentary, 52', 1994), a French-Belgian co-production; a quintet of documentaries for Dubai Television, in the United Arab Emirates, from 1999 to 2004; Iraq: The Song of the Missing Men (documentary, 93', 2005), an ethnological reading of post-occupation realities in Iraq; The Executioner's Tear (documentary short, 26', 2013), a condemnation of barbarian executions in Egypt that was co-produced by French public television channel France 3 and Orok Films.

With the exception of a couple of early short fictional films, Layth Abdulamir makes a full-time living as a documentary filmmaker, building a field of specialization in topics related to the Arab world and filming mainly in the United Arab Emirates, Yemen, Egypt, and Irak.

== Awards and nominations ==
- 1987: “The Cradle”, winner in 1986 of the Grand Prize in the Damascus Film Festival in Syria.
- 2005: Iraq: The Song of the Missing Men, Winner - Hossam Ali Award for Best Arab Documentary, Ismailia International Documentary Festival for Documentaries and Shorts, Ismailia, Egypt
- 2006: Iraq: The Song of the Missing Men, Nominee - Youth Award, Vesoul International Film Festival of Asian Cinema, Vesoul, France
- 2013: The Executioner's Tear, Winner - Best Short Documentary (Jury Prize), Tirana International Film Festival, Tirana, Albania
- January 25, 2014: The Executioner's Tear, Winner - Best Screenplay (Jury Prize), Festival du Film Court Francophone de Vaulx-en-Velin, Vaulx-en-Velin, France
- 2014 : Winner - Best Short Documentary FMCE Festival Veracruz - Mexico.
- 2014 : Prix du meilleur court-métrage, Festival de cinéma Vues d'Afrique de Montréal – Canada.
- 2014 : Festival de court métrage de Limoges France, Mention Spéciale du Jury.
- 2014: Lanzarote international film festival 14eme Edition-Mention special: ‘Las lágrimas del Verdugo.
- 2014 : Festival de Larissa en Grèce. Mention spéciale. 2015: Special mention in AfryKamera African Film Festival- Poland.
- 2014: The Executioner's Tear, Nominee - Official Selection, 12th 'In The Palace' International Short Film Festival, Balchik, Bulgaria
- 2014: The Executioner's Tear, Winner - Best Mediterranean Short Documentary (Sponsored by Orange S.A.), 18th International Festival of Mediterranean Documentary Film and Reportage, Marseille, France

== Filmography ==
- 1982-1985 - 3 short features: Night Chat, President, and Death.
- 1985 - The Cradle (Le berceau), short fictional film, 21 min., Beta SP, Soviet Union
- 1987 - Kurdistan, Chemical Bomb (Kurdistan, bombe chimique)
- 1994 - Yemen, a Time for the Sacred (Yémen, le temps du sacré), in collaboration with French poet, essayist, musician and experimental filmmaker Michel Bulteau (script and texts)
- 1998 - Naseer Shamma, from Baghdad to Seville: Portrait of the Great Iraqi Lute Player (Naseer Shamma, de Bagdad à Séville), co-directed with Francis Lapeyre, a musical roadtrip with Iraqi musician Naseer Shamma, 45 min., TV documentary
- 1999 - Yemen, Music from the Heart of Arabia (Yémen, musiques du coeur de l'Arabie), TV documentary
- 2000 - Twilight Exotic Dancer, TV documentary for Dubai Television
- 2001 - The Birth of the Euro (La naissance de l’Euro)
- 2002 - Africa, Africa (Afrique, Afrique)
- 2003 - Do Not Cry, Africa (Afrique, ne pleure pas)
- 2004 - Baiyaa, Baghdad (Bayaa, Bagdad)
- 2005 - Sunflower, short fictional film, 20 min., 16 mm
- 2006 - Iraq: The Song of the Missing Men (Irak, le chant des absents)
- 2011 - Christians of Iraq, Chronicles of an Announced Exodus (Chrétiens d'Irak: Chronique d'un exode annoncé)
- 2013 - The Executioner's Tear (La Larme du bourreau)
