= Karel Freja =

Czech footballer (1877–1937)

Personal information
- Date of birth: 17 November 1877
- Place of birth: Old Town (Prague), Bohemia, Austria-Hungary
- Date of death: 30 April 1937 (aged 59)
- Place of death: New Town (Prague), Czechoslovakia
- Height: 1.65 m (5 ft 5 in)
- Position: Forward

Senior career*
Years	Team	Apps	(Gls)
1896–1900	Slavia Prague	17	(12)
1900–1901	ČAFC Vinohrady		
- * Club domestic league appearances and goals

Karel Freja (17 November 1877 – 30 April 1937) was a Czech footballer who played as a forward.

== Early life ==
Karel Freja was born on 17 November 1877 in the Old Town of Prague. He spent the period between 1888 and 1899 studying at the grammar school. He attended the Municipal High School, which was located in a beautiful building in today's Hellichová (then Novodvorská) Street in Malá Strana.

Even as a high school student, Karel Freja took part in progressive events. Being active in the progressive movement caused Freja serious problems at school. National newspapers later wrote about him after the First World War: "he was already at the gymnasium on four with a disciplinary order for activity in the progressive movement."

Football became very popular among high school students. It was played by students of both the Malostran grammar school and the real school. The groups used the names of schools or regions, and thus the Malostransky student football club was created. Under the leadership of Freja, the Malostransky circle played a number of matches. On 28 September 1895, he even beat Sparta on its then-ground in Invalidovna.

== Club career ==
In the spring of 1896 the entire Malostranský circle joined the SK Slavia Prague football team, as well as students from the real gymnasium in Křemencova Street.

Freja became Slavia's first captain and also its first centre forward. He most likely already played in the premiere match, the line-up of which has not been preserved. Freja was the first great figure of Czech football. Freja once again introduced iron discipline as team captain. Freja played 17 games and scored 12 goals for Slavia Prague. Freja was Slavia Prague's best player until 1900, then he moved to ČAFC Vinohrady.

== Later career ==
He graduated as a doctor on 24 January 1911. He then went to Mladá Boleslav, where he worked as a doctor in the district hospital and also acted as a football referee. During the Balkan war against Turkey from 1912 to 1913, Freja was a volunteer member of the Czech Medical Auxiliary Corps on the Montenegrin battlefield. Immediately after the announcement of mobilisation in July 1914, Freja went to the Galician fortress town of Přemyšl. This was followed by captivity, service in the Kiev evacuation hospital, work as a surgeon in the field hospital of the Serbian volunteer corps and other places of work. He travelled from the Thessaloniki front to Cognac, France at the end of the war, when he was assigned to the 23rd Czechoslovak Rifle Regiment as its chief physician. He returned to his homeland with the regimental headquarters on 14 January 1919.

After the dissolution of the legions, he joined the Czechoslovak army, on 13 November 1930, he was promoted to colonel of the health service. For his participation in military conflicts, he received many orders, military crosses, decorations and medals. He was evaluated almost exclusively positively by his commanders. He is said to have been direct, open and manly in character, a highly intelligent and conscientious officer who had a good influence over his subordinates and maintained discipline. He is also characterised as a diligent doctor with a good education in the field of dental and surgical diseases.

== Later life ==
On 1 January 1935, Freja transferred to retirement. He died after a long and serious illness at the age of 59 in the general hospital in Prague from cirrhosis of the liver on 30 April 1937. His remains have been located in the scattered meadow at the Malvazinky Cemetery in Smíchov since the first half of the 1980s.
