= Laith Al-Juneidi =

Palestinian filmmaker (born 1978)

Laith Al-Juneidi (Arabic: ليث الجنيدي, born December 9, 1978, in Hebron, Palestine), is a Palestinian film director and producer.

== Biography ==
He studied for the Bachelor of Arts degree in communication, Culture and Media at Coventry University Department of Media and Communication, graduating with a First Class Honours degree. He also took post-graduate studies in Visual Cultures at the same university. He produced a number of short fictional and factual films as well as training videos and commercials.

Despite its short duration, his film War vs. Peace got international recognition as a bold statement questioning the representation of war in mainstream media. Early in his life, prior to joining Coventry University, he worked as a producer at a local radio station. He produced and directed The Invisible Policeman, a feature documentary following Palestinian Lieutenant Nidal, who lives an extreme paradoxical life. The film was co-produced and co-funded by the Jan Vrijman Fund in the Netherlands and Enjaaz of Dubai International Film Festival, in the United Arab Emirates. The film was officially selected to premier at the prestigious International Documentary Film Festival Amsterdam. In 2011, he established Ishtar Creative Productions, a production house that specializes in producing documentaries and feature films.
