= Steilmann =

German textile company

Steilmann Group
- Industry: Textile
- Founded: 1958; 68 years ago
- Founder: Klaus Steilmann
- Headquarters: Wattenscheid, Germany
- Number of employees: Over 18,000 (1998)

Steilmann was a German textile group which had its headquarters in Wattenscheid (Bochum) and at its 1998 peak employed over 18,000 people. After near-bankruptcy in 2006 broke up the group, some parts continue to use the Steilmann name.

Founded in 1958 by Klaus Steilmann (1929–2009), the Steilmann Group at its peak in 1998 employed over 18,000 people in 14 countries, and had turnover of nearly 1.5bn DM. With increasing difficulties from increased competition in the sector after 1998, Steilmann narrowly avoided bankruptcy in 2006, its parts being sold to the Radici Group (Miro Radici AG), which had previously acquired parts of Steilmann, including Steilmann Eastern Europe in 2003.

Klaus Steilmann died on 13 November 2009.
