= World Relief =

Humanitarian organization

- World Relief Corporation of National Association of Evangelicals
- Formation: 1944; 82 years ago
- Type: International NGO
- Tax ID no.: 23-6393344
- Legal status: 501(c)(3)
- Purpose: Relief and Development
- Headquarters: Baltimore, Maryland, U.S.
- Coordinates: 39.289555°N 76.614657°W
- Services: Advocacy, Agriculture, Community Development, Disaster Response, HIV/AIDS Prevention, Immigration Legal Services, Maternal and Child Health, Peace Building, and Refugee Resettlement
- President & Chief Executive Officer: Myal Greene
- Chief People Officer: Alexis Brown
- Chief administrative officer: Kevin Sanderson
- Chief Financial Officer: Dick Oyieko
- Parent organization: National Association of Evangelicals
- Subsidiaries: World Relief Global Development LLC _{(LLC)}, IMF Hekima Societe Civile (Congo), Turame Community Finance SA (Belarus)
- Website: worldrelief.org

World Relief (officially World Relief Corporation of National Association of Evangelicals) is a global Christian humanitarian organization.

== History ==
World Relief, originally named the War Relief Commission, was founded as a commission in 1944 by the National Association of Evangelicals to send clothing and food to victims of World War II. After the war, the War Relief Commission decided to continue working in post-war Europe and around the world. In 1950, the agency was renamed World Relief and began to focus on other areas, such as providing sewing machines and training to war widows, setting up TB clinics, land reclamation projects, and assisting post–Korean War Korean children by establishing clinics and providing food and clothing. They have also resettled refugees such as author Clemantine Wamariya.

World Relief is organized as a corporation, and the National Association of Evangelicals is the sole shareholder. Myal Greene has served as President/CEO since 2021.

In January 2025, the Trump administration froze USAID funding pending a 90-day review. Waivers are planned to be available for some projects, but by mid-February, World Relief had not yet received money for distributing seeds for planting season in Haiti or helping to provide malnutrition relief in civil-war-torn Sudan. More broadly for both international efforts and legal refugee resettlement within the United States, World Relief has raised an additional $4.5 million from churches and private donors, although some employees have been furloughed and a funding gap of $3.5 million remains as of mid-February.
