= Bochum =

City in Germany

Bochum Baukem (Westphalian)
- City
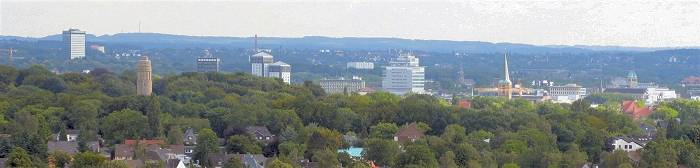
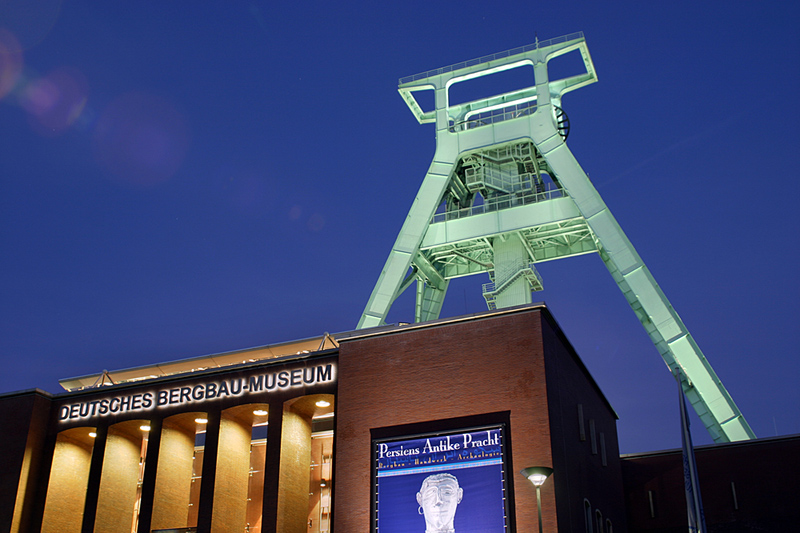
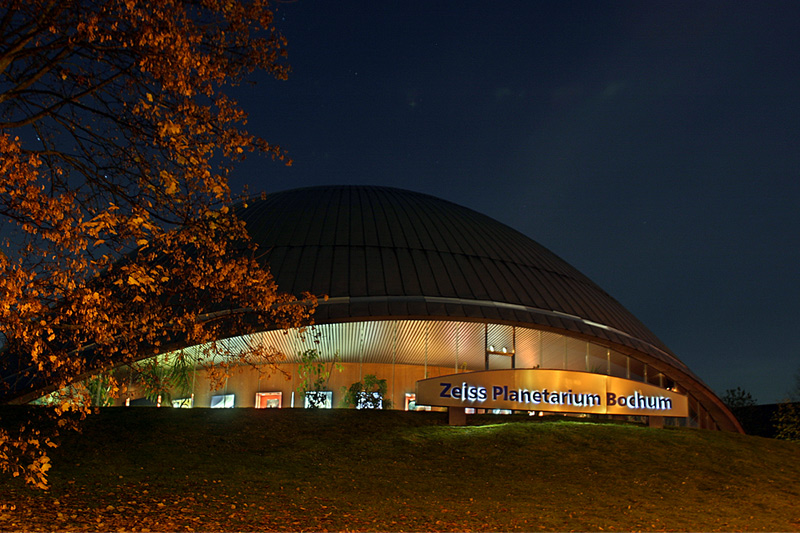
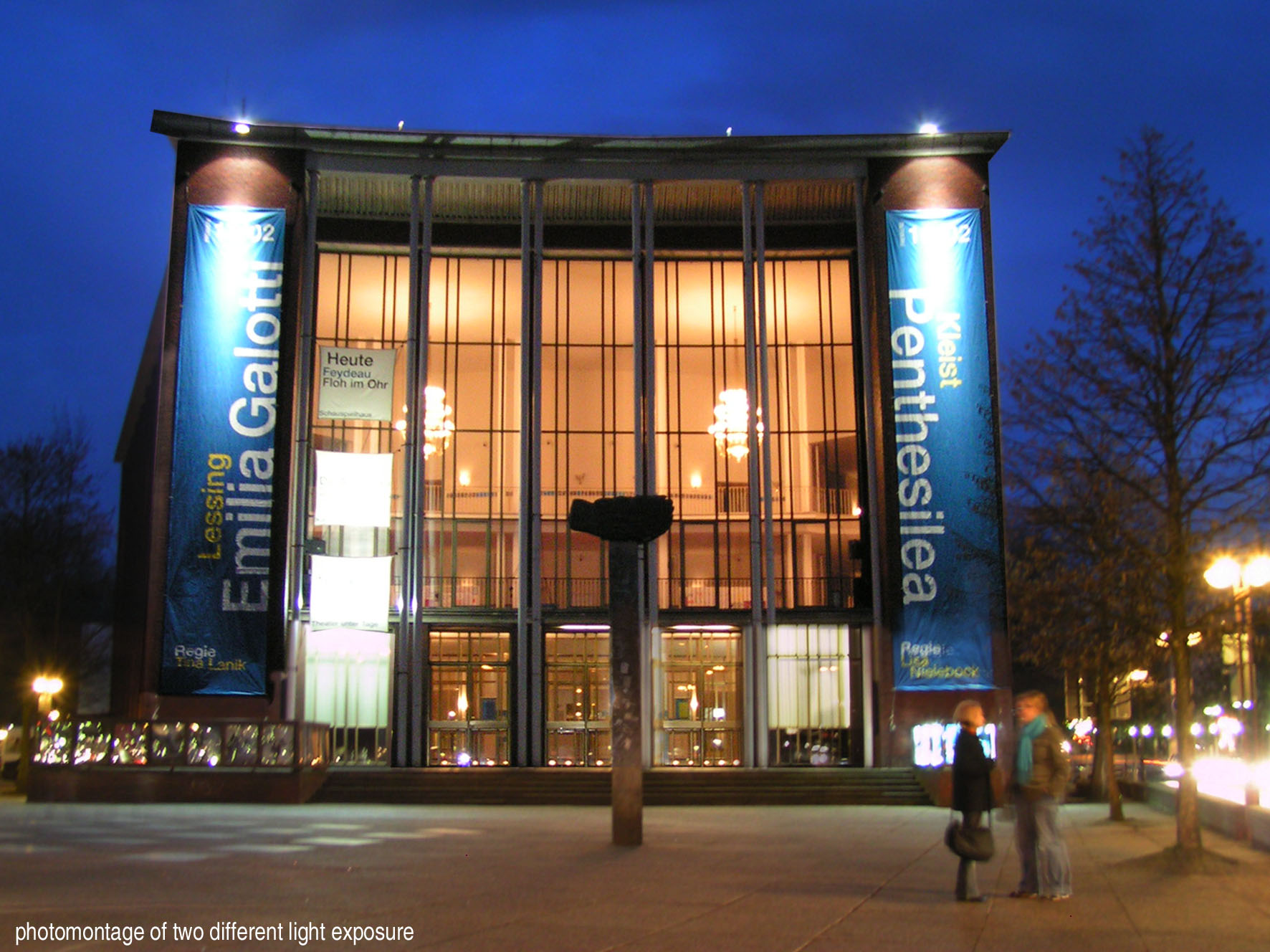
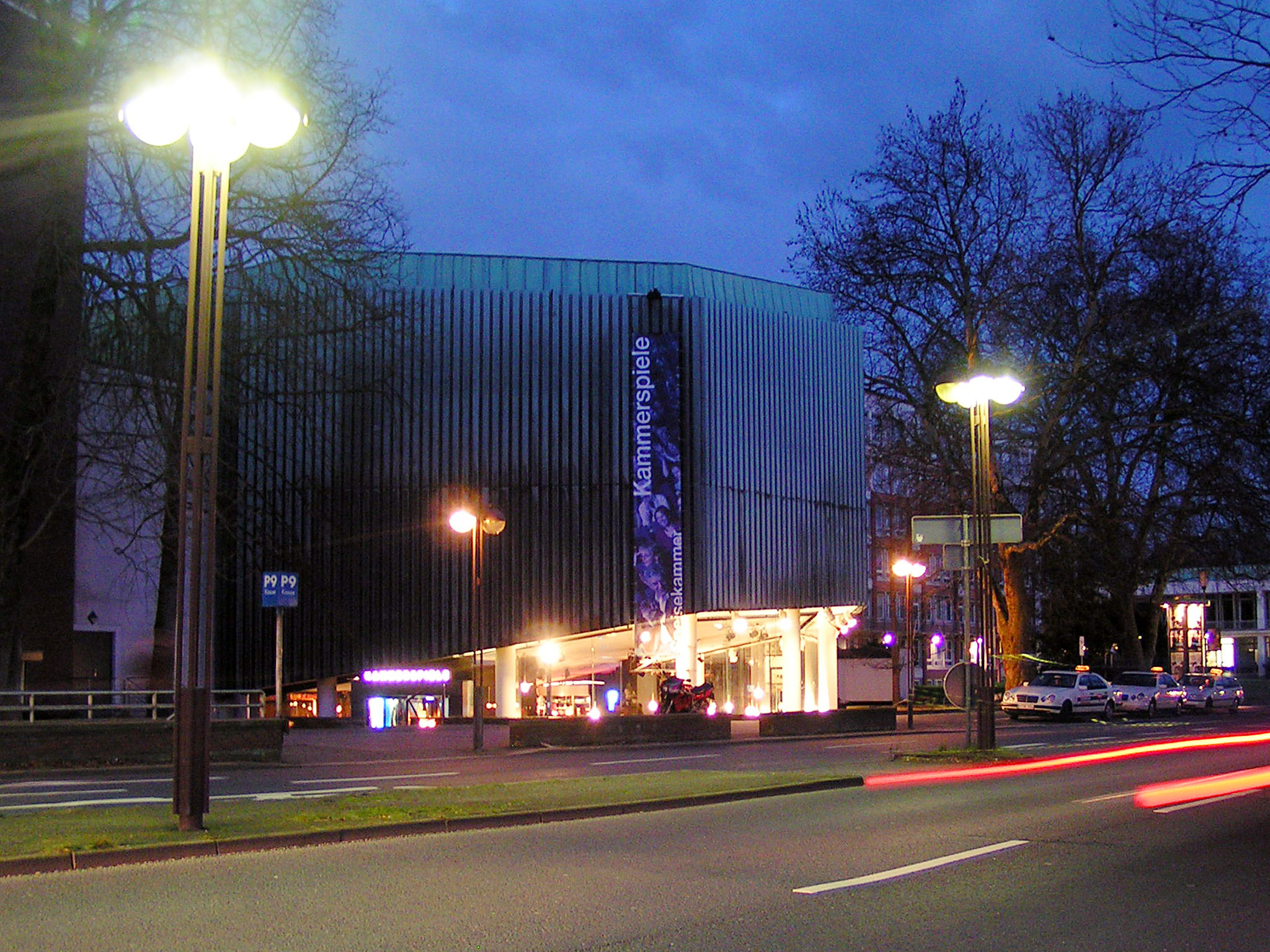
- Bochum Skyline German Mining Museum Zeiss Planetarium Bochum Schauspielhaus Bochum Bochum Kammerspiele

- Flag Coat of arms
- Interactive map of Bochum
- Location within Germany Location within North Rhine-Westphalia
- Coordinates: 51°28′55″N 07°12′57″E
- Country: Germany
- State: North Rhine-Westphalia
- Admin. region: Arnsberg
- District: Urban district

Government
  - Mayor (2025–30): Jörg Lukat (SPD)
  - Governing parties: SPD/ Greens (minority)

Area
  - City: 145.4 km^{2} (56.1 sq mi)

Population (2025-12-31)
  - City: 358,880
  - Density: 2,468/km^{2} (6,393/sq mi)
  - Metro: 5,166,484
- Time zone: UTC+01:00 (CET)
  - Summer (DST): UTC+02:00 (CEST)
- Postal codes: 44701-44894
- Dialling codes: 0234, 02327
- Vehicle registration: BO, WAT
- Website: www.bochum.de

Bochum (/ˈboʊxʊm/ BOH-khuum, US also /ˈboʊxəm/ BOH-khəm; German: [ˈboːxʊm]; Westphalian: Baukem) is a city in North Rhine-Westphalia. With a population of 372,348 (April 2023), it is the sixth-largest city (after Cologne, Düsseldorf, Dortmund, Essen and Duisburg) in North Rhine-Westphalia, the most populous German federal state, and the 16th-largest city in Germany. On the Ruhr Heights (Ruhrhöhen) hill chain, between the rivers Ruhr to the south and Emscher to the north (tributaries of the Rhine), it is the second largest city of Westphalia after Dortmund, and the fourth largest city of the Ruhr after Dortmund, Essen and Duisburg. It lies at the centre of the Ruhr, Germany's largest urban area, in the Rhine-Ruhr Metropolitan Region, the second biggest metropolitan region by GDP in the European Union, and belongs to the region of Arnsberg. There are nine institutions of higher education in the city, most notably the Ruhr University Bochum (Ruhr-Universität Bochum), one of the ten largest universities in Germany, and the Bochum University of Applied Sciences (Hochschule Bochum).

== Geography ==
=== Geographical position ===
The city lies on the low rolling hills of Bochum land ridge (Bochumer Landrücken), part of the Ruhrhöhen (highest elevations) between the Ruhr and Emscher rivers at the border of the southern and northern Ruhr coal region. The highest point of the city is at Kemnader Straße (Kemnader Street) in Stiepel at 196 metres (643 ft) above sea level; the lowest point is 43 metres (141 ft) at the Blumenkamp in Hordel.

The terrain of Bochum is characterised by rolling hills that rarely have more than three per cent graduation. Steeper graduation can be found at the Harpener Hellweg near the Berghofer Holz nature reserve (3.4%), at Westenfelder Straße in the borough of Wattenscheid (3.47%), or at Kemnader Straße, which begins at the banks of the Ruhr in Stiepel (71 m, 233 ft), and rises to its highest point in the centre of Stiepel (196 m, 643 ft, a 5.1% increase).

The city extends north to south 13.0 km (8.1 mi) and 17.1 km (10.6 mi) east to west. The perimeter of the city limits is 67.2 km (41.8 mi).

It is surrounded by the cities of (in clockwise direction) Herne, Castrop-Rauxel, Dortmund, Witten, Hattingen, Essen and Gelsenkirchen.

=== Geology ===
There is sedimentary rock of carbon and chalk. The geological strata can be visited in the former quarry of Klosterbusch in Querenburg and at the Geological Gardens in Wiemelhausen.

=== Waterways ===
The urban area is divided into the river Ruhr catchment in the south and the Emscher catchment in the north. The Ruhr's tributaries are the Oelbach (where as well a waste water treatment plant is established), Gerther Mühlenbach, Harpener Bach, Langendreer Bach, Lottenbach, Hörsterholzer Bach and the Knöselbach. The Ruhr in combination with upstream reservoirs is also used for drinking water abstraction. The Emscher's tributaries are Hüller Bach with Dorneburger Mühlenbach, Hofsteder Bach, Marbach, Ahbach, Kabeisemannsbach and Goldhammer Bach. The industrial developments in the region since the 19th century were leading to a kind of division of labour between the two river catchments, pumping drinking water from the Ruhr into the municipal supply system and discharging waste water mainly into the Emscher system. Today approximately 10% of the waste water in the Emscher catchment is discharged via the Hüller Bach. and treated in the centralized waste water treatment plant of the Emschergenossenschaft in Bottrop. The ecological restoration of the Emscher tributaries initiated by the Emschergenossenschaft started with the Internationale Bauausstellung Emscher Park in 1989.

=== Vegetation ===
The south of the city has woods, the best known of which are the Weitmarer Holz. These are generally mixed forests of oak and beech. The occurrence of holly gives evidence of Bochum's temperate climate. 844 species of plants can be found within the city limits

=== Climate ===
Bochum features an Oceanic climate (Köppen: Cfb; Trewartha: Dobk) characterized by cool winters and short warm summers. Extreme temperatures are uncommon. However, temperatures rising above 30 °C (86 °F) are to be expected on multiple days in summer and the climate station closest to the City did record a peak temperature of 40 °C (104 °F) on July 25, 2019.

On the other extreme, freezing temperatures are common between mid-November and late March. In some years, however, frosts may occur as late as early May. Temperatures below −10 °C are, especially in recent years, only seen on rare occasions. The city lies within the warmer extent of the 8a USDA plant hardiness zone (−12.2 to −9.4 °C or 10 to 15 °F). Some winters may pass without a frost below −5 °C (data from the nearest active climate station). These comparably mild conditions in Winter permit the planting of plants that would either not be reliably hardy or not able to bloom throughout Germany like Trachycarpus palms, Summer lilac, Paulownia tomentosa and Rosemary.

However, winters can be unpredictable with strong fluctuations in temperatures: In mid-February 2021, the city was affected by a severe cold spell bringing temperatures down to –15 degrees Celsius (5 °F) accompanied by heavy snowfall which hindered traffic for multiple days. A week later, a temperature of 17 °C (63 °F) was recorded, an increase of 32K.

The total precipitation of 815mm is distributed relatively evenly through most of the year but has a peak in winter and two minima in late spring and July, respectively. June shows a second peak in precipitation due to the return of the westerlies which leads to more thunderstorms being generated along frontal boundaries of Atlantic low-pressure systems. In recent years, the city was affected by summer and spring droughts. Thunderstorms are not uncommon in the warm season and can generate intense downpours and sporadically hail.

The city experiences little sunshine in winter with a minimum of 1,3h per day in December and a lot more in early summer and late spring with May featuring 7.5h per day. The total amount of sunshine per year is 1689h.

Due to the city's northern latitude of 51°N, seasonal day-length variation is significant. The longest day of the year, June 21, features 16 h 38 min. of daylight while the shortest day of the year which is December 21 is only 7 h and 50 min. long.

Climate data for Bochum (1991–2020 normals, extremes 1940–present)
Month	Jan	Feb	Mar	Apr	May	Jun	Jul	Aug	Sep	Oct	Nov	Dec	Year
Record high °C (°F)	16.6 (61.9)	19.0 (66.2)	23.7 (74.7)	28.5 (83.3)	32.1 (89.8)	36.3 (97.3)	36.0 (96.8)	37.3 (99.1)	33.5 (92.3)	27.4 (81.3)	21.6 (70.9)	17.9 (64.2)	37.3 (99.1)
Mean maximum °C (°F)	12.6 (54.7)	12.5 (54.5)	18.7 (65.7)	23.8 (74.8)	27.6 (81.7)	30.3 (86.5)	32.8 (91.0)	32.2 (90.0)	28.2 (82.8)	22.6 (72.7)	16.7 (62.1)	12.4 (54.3)	34.2 (93.6)
Mean daily maximum °C (°F)	5.8 (42.4)	5.7 (42.3)	10.6 (51.1)	15.1 (59.2)	19.4 (66.9)	21.7 (71.1)	24.4 (75.9)	23.7 (74.7)	19.8 (67.6)	14.6 (58.3)	9.6 (49.3)	6.4 (43.5)	14.7 (58.5)
Daily mean °C (°F)	3.3 (37.9)	2.8 (37.0)	6.5 (43.7)	10.1 (50.2)	14.0 (57.2)	16.6 (61.9)	18.9 (66.0)	18.2 (64.8)	14.5 (58.1)	10.5 (50.9)	6.8 (44.2)	4.0 (39.2)	10.5 (50.9)
Mean daily minimum °C (°F)	0.7 (33.3)	−0.2 (31.6)	2.3 (36.1)	4.7 (40.5)	8.1 (46.6)	11.1 (52.0)	13.4 (56.1)	12.8 (55.0)	9.9 (49.8)	6.7 (44.1)	3.9 (39.0)	1.5 (34.7)	6.2 (43.2)
Mean minimum °C (°F)	−7.4 (18.7)	−7.3 (18.9)	−4.1 (24.6)	−1.6 (29.1)	1.0 (33.8)	5.7 (42.3)	8.0 (46.4)	7.5 (45.5)	4.5 (40.1)	−0.1 (31.8)	−3.3 (26.1)	−6.3 (20.7)	−10.3 (13.5)
Record low °C (°F)	−20.3 (−4.5)	−17.3 (0.9)	−12.3 (9.9)	−5.4 (22.3)	−1.4 (29.5)	2.5 (36.5)	5.1 (41.2)	5.5 (41.9)	0.8 (33.4)	−4.5 (23.9)	−7.1 (19.2)	−17.1 (1.2)	−20.3 (−4.5)
Average precipitation mm (inches)	73.8 (2.91)	46.0 (1.81)	53.4 (2.10)	38.1 (1.50)	51.9 (2.04)	79.2 (3.12)	93.6 (3.69)	84.2 (3.31)	65.4 (2.57)	63.3 (2.49)	78.8 (3.10)	85.9 (3.38)	813.7 (32.04)
Average extreme snow depth cm (inches)	4.9 (1.9)	2.7 (1.1)	0.9 (0.4)	0 (0)	0 (0)	0 (0)	0 (0)	0 (0)	0 (0)	0 (0)	0.5 (0.2)	4.5 (1.8)	9.6 (3.8)
Average precipitation days (≥ 1.0 mm)	18.1	16.2	15.1	13.7	13.7	15.2	16.1	15.9	13.4	16.1	18.8	20.6	193.0
Average relative humidity (%)	83.9	80.7	74.9	70.7	70.8	73.3	72.8	74.3	79.5	82.8	84.6	85.9	77.9
Mean monthly sunshine hours	52.8	70.3	125.6	167.1	183.6	177.4	202.3	191.0	144.1	107.4	59.1	42.0	1,522.7
Source: Deutscher Wetterdienst/SKlima.de

=== Districts ===
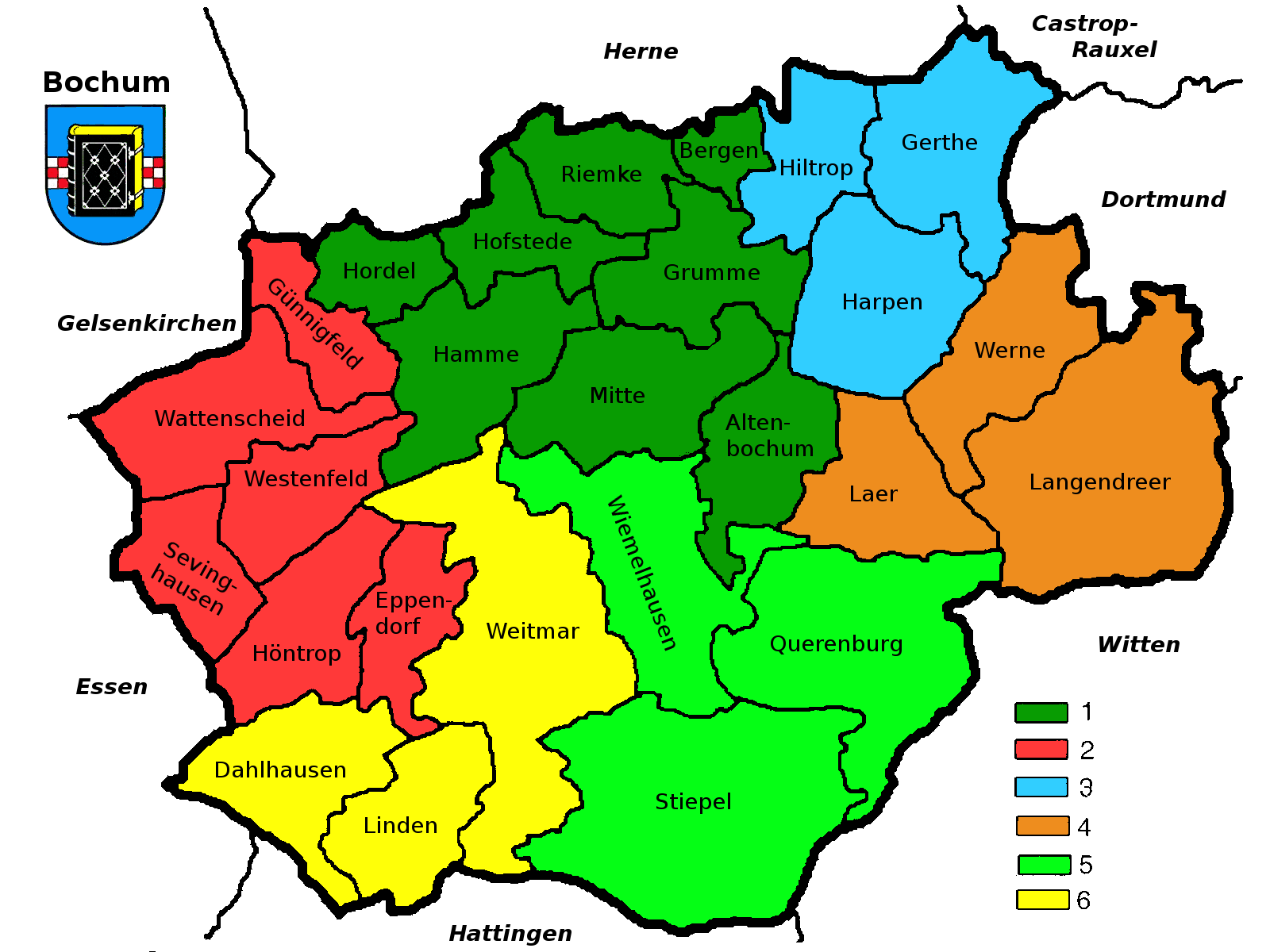
Sections and Districts in Bochum

Bochum is divided into six administrative sections (stadtbezirke), alongside their respective sub-districts (stadtteile), with a total of 362,213 inhabitants living in an urban area of 145.4 km^{2} (56.1 sq mi).

- Bochum-Mitte includes Innenstadt, Hamme (including Goldhamme, and Stahlhausen), Hordel, Hofstede, Riemke, Grumme and Altenbochum There are 102,145 inhabitants living in an area of 32.60 km^{2} (12.59 sq mi).
- Wattenscheid includes Wattenscheid-Mitte, Leithe, Günnigfeld, Westenfeld, Sevinghausen, Höntrop, Munscheid and Eppendorf (which includes Engelsburg and Heide). There are 74,602 inhabitants living in an area of 23.87 km^{2} (9.22 sq mi).
- North includes Bergen, Hiltrop, (Note: Bergen is a very small district and is sometimes included with Hiltrop, the two being referred to jointly as Bergen-Hiltrop) Gerthe, Harpen (including Rosenberg), Kornharpen, and Voede-Abzweig. There are 37,004 inhabitants living in an area of 18.86 km^{2} (7.28 sq mi).
- East includes Laer, Werne, and Langendreer (including Ümmingen and Kaltehardt). There are 55,193 inhabitants living in an area of 23.46 km^{2} (9.06 sq mi).
- South includes Wiemelhausen (which includes Brenschede, and Ehrenfeld), Stiepel (which includes Haar, Brockhausen and Schrick) and Querenburg (which includes Hustadt and Steinkuhl). There are 50,866 inhabitants living in an area of 27.11 km^{2} (10.47 sq mi).
- Southwest includes Weitmar (which includes Bärendorf, Mark, and Neuling), Sundern, Linden and Dahlhausen. There are 56,510 inhabitants living in an area of 19.50 km^{2} (7.53 sq mi).

== Politics ==
=== Mayor ===
Results of the second round of the 2025 mayoral election

The current mayor of Bochum is Jörg Lukat of the Social Democratic Party (SPD), who was elected in 2025, and the results were as follows:

Candidate	Party	First round		Second round	
Candidate	Party	Votes	%	Votes	%
Jörg Lukat	SPD, Greens	66,303	43.1	69,933	64.7
Dr. Andreas Bracke	Christian Democratic Union	35,202	22.9	38,206	35.3
Cornelia Heitmann	Alternative for Germany	22,611	14.7		
Wiebke Köllner	The Left	14,236	9.3		
Jens Lücking	UWG: Free Citizens	4,072	2.7		
Nadja Zein-Draeger	Volt, The Citymakers	3,555	2.3		
Lena Maria Christina Bormann	Die PARTEI	2,351	1.5		
Sahver Münch	"Of Love to Bochum" Independent	2,073	1.4		
Susanne Anna Schneider	Free Democratic Party	1,945	1.3		
Pardis Parinejad	"Good for Bochum" Independent	1,443	0.9		
Valid votes		153,791	99.3	108,139	98.5
Invalid votes		1,089	0.7	1,613	1.5
Total		154,880	100.0	109,752	100.0
Electorate/voter turnout		281,580	55.0	281,413	39.0
Source: City of Bochum (1st round, 2nd round)

=== City council ===
Results of the 2025 city council election

The Bochum city council governs the city alongside the mayor. The most recent city council election was held on 14 September 2025, and the results were as follows:

Party	Votes	%	+/-	Seats	+/-
Social Democratic Party (SPD)	43,201	28.1	▼5.6	26	▼3
Christian Democratic Union (CDU)	30.789	20.0	▼0.8	18	Steady
Alternative for Germany (AfD)	22,825	14.9	▲9.2	14	▲9
Alliance 90/The Greens (Grüne)	22,110	14.39	▼7.8	13	▼6
The Left (Die Linke)	14,668	9.5	▲3.4	9	▲4
UWG: Free Citizens (UWG)	5,081	3.3	▼0.1	3	Steady
Free Democratic Party (FDP)	2,964	1.9	▼1.3	2	▼1
The Citymakers (Die Stadtgestalter)	2,589	1.68	▼0.05	2	Steady
Sahra Wagenknecht Alliance (BSW)	2,550	1.7	New	2	New
Volt Germany (Volt)	2,368	1.5	New	1	New
Die PARTEI (PARTEI)	2,062	1.3	▼1.0	1	▼1
Wattenscheid Chance	1,244	0.8	New	1	New
Human Environment Animal Protection (Tierschutz)	925	0.6	New	0	New
Grassroots Democratic Party of Germany (dieBasis)	207	0.1	New	0	New
BoWIR	98	0.1	New	0	New
Valid votes	153,681	99.3			
Invalid votes	1,147	0.7			
Total	154,828	100.0		92	▲6
Electorate/voter turnout	281,567	55.0	▲6.3		
Source: City of Bochum

== History ==
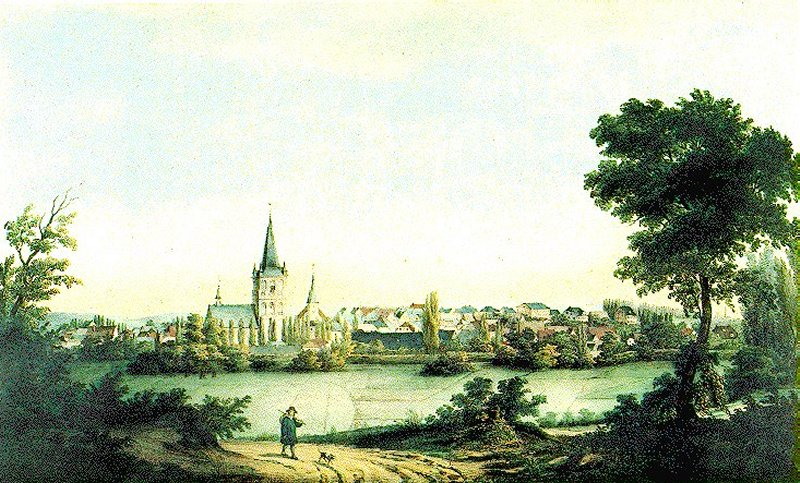
View of Bochum in 1840

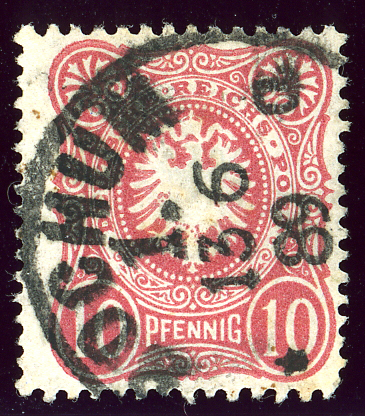
Stamp cancelled at BOCHUM 1 in 1889

Bochum dates from the 9th century, when Charlemagne set up a royal court at the junction of two important trade routes. It was first officially mentioned in 1041 as Cofbuokheim in a document of the archbishops of Cologne. In 1321, Count Engelbert II von der Marck granted Bochum a town charter, but the town remained insignificant until the 19th century, when the coal mining and steel industries emerged in the Ruhr area, leading to the growth of the entire region. In the early 19th century it was part of the Grand Duchy of Berg, a client state of France, then it passed to Prussia following the Napoleonic Wars in 1815, and in 1871 it became part of the German Empire. The population of Bochum increased from about 4,500 in 1850 to 100,000 in 1904. Bochum acquired city status, incorporating neighbouring towns and villages. Additional population gains came from immigration, primarily from Poland. Bochum was the main center of the Polish community of the Ruhr, being the seat of various Polish organizations and enterprises. The Poles were subjected to anti-Polish policies aimed at Germanisation, and the Central Office for Monitoring the Polish Movement in the Rhine-Westphalian Industrial District (Zentralstelle fur Uberwachung der Polenbewegung im Rheinisch-Westfalischen Industriebezirke) was established by the German authorities in Bochum in 1909.

=== Ruhr occupation ===
Bochum was occupied by French troops in January 1923 and remained under French military control until mid July 1925.

=== The Nazi era and World War II ===
On 28 October 1938, 250 Polish or stateless Jews were expelled from Bochum to Poland. On 9 November 1938, Kristallnacht, the Bochum synagogue was set on fire and there was rioting against Jewish citizens. The first Jews from Bochum were deported to Nazi concentration camps and many Jewish institutions and homes were destroyed. Some 500 Jewish citizens are known by name to have been killed in the Holocaust, including 19 who were younger than 16 years old. Joseph Klirsfeld was Bochum's rabbi at this time. He and his wife fled to Palestine. In December 1938, the Jewish elementary school teacher Else Hirsch began organising groups of children and adolescents to be sent to the Netherlands and England, sending ten groups in all. Many Jewish children and those from other persecuted groups were taken in by Dutch families and thereby saved from abduction or deportation and death.

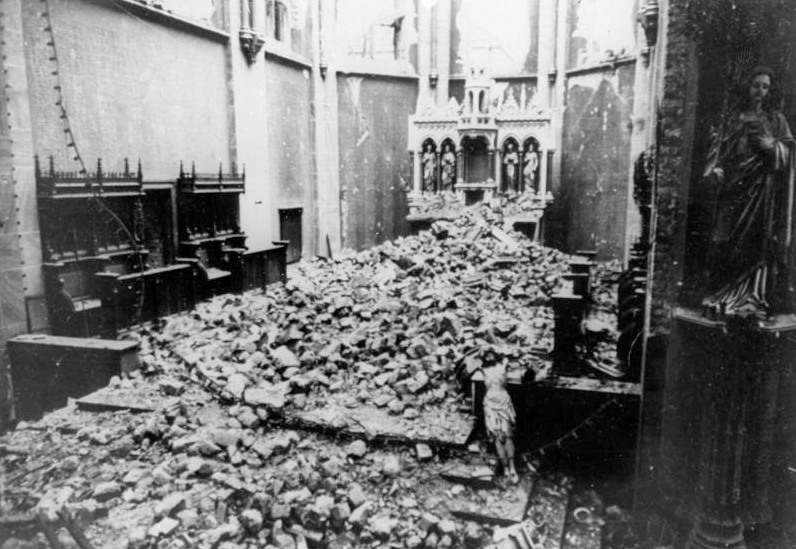
Bombed St. Mary Church, 1943

On 15 July 1939, the Gestapo entered the headquarters of the Union of Poles in Germany in Bochum, searched it and interrogated its chief Michał Wesołowski, however, it did not obtain the desired lists of Polish activists, which had been previously hidden by Poles. Increased Nazi terror and persecutions of Poles followed, and in response, many Poles from the region came to Bochum for organizational and information meetings. During the German invasion of Poland, which started World War II in September 1939, the Nazis carried out mass arrests of local Polish activists, who were then sent to concentration camps. Local Polish premises and seats of organizations were looted and expropriated by Nazi Germany.

During the war, Germany operated a prison in the city with three forced labour subcamps within present-day city limits, an additional detention center, a camp for Romani people in the present-day Wattenscheid district, three subcamps of the Buchenwald concentration camp, and a detachment of the 3rd SS construction brigade.

A report from July 1943 listed 100 forced labour camps in Bochum.

Because the Ruhr region was an area of high residential density and a centre for the manufacture of weapons, it was a major target in the war. Women with young children, school children and the homeless fled or were evacuated to safer areas, leaving cities largely deserted to the arms industry, coal mines and steel plants and those unable to leave.

During the Holocaust, in 1942–1943, local Jews were deported to German-occupied Czechoslovakia, Latvia and Poland.

Bochum was first bombed heavily in May and June 1943. On 13 May 1943, the city hall was hit, destroying the top floor, and leaving the next two floors in flames. On 4 November 1944, in an attack involving 700 British bombers, the steel plant, Bochumer Verein, was hit. One of the largest steel plants in Germany, more than 10,000 high-explosive and 130,000 incendiary bombs were stored there, setting off a conflagration that destroyed the surrounding neighbourhoods. An aerial photo shows the devastation.

The town centre of Bochum was a strategic target during the Oil Campaign. In 150 air raids on Bochum, over 1,300 bombs were dropped on Bochum and Gelsenkirchen. By the end of the war, 38% of Bochum had been destroyed. 70,000 citizens were homeless and at least 4,095 dead. Of Bochum's more than 90,000 homes, only 25,000 remained for the 170,000 citizens who survived the war, many by fleeing to other areas. Most of the remaining buildings were damaged, many with only one usable room. Only 1,000 houses in Bochum remained undamaged after the war. Only two of 122 schools remained unscathed; others were totally destroyed. Hunger was rampant. A resident of neighbouring Essen was quoted on 23 April 1945 as saying, "Today, I used up my last potato... it will be a difficult time till the new [autumn] potatoes are ready to be picked – if they're not stolen."

The US army ground advance into Germany reached Bochum in April 1945. Encountering desultory resistance, the US 79th Infantry Division captured the city on 10 April 1945.

After the war, Bochum was occupied by the British, who established two camps to house people displaced by the war. The majority of them were former Polish Zwangsarbeiter, forced labourers, many of them from the Bochumer Verein.

Allied bombing destroyed 83% of the built up area of Bochum during World War II. Today around a third of Bochum consists of buildings from before World War II. More than sixty years after the war, bombs continue to be found in the region, usually by construction workers. One found in October 2008 in Bochum town centre led to the evacuation of 400 and involved hundreds of emergency workers. A month earlier, a buried bomb exploded in neighbouring Hattingen, injuring 17 people.

Largest groups of foreign residents
Nationality	Population (31.12.2018)
Turkey	8,852
Syria	8,075
Poland	3,779
Romania	2,021
Italy	1,902
Iraq	1,600
Serbia	1,413
Greece	1,260
Iran	1,209
Russia	1,010
China	987
Bulgaria	983
Kosovo	961
Ukraine	850
Bosnia	850
Afghanistan	748
Spain	719
Croatia	699

=== Post-war period ===
After the war, Bochum was part of West Germany and the newly established state of North Rhine-Westphalia, consisting of the Rhineland and Westphalia.

In the postwar period, Bochum began developing as a cultural centre of the Ruhr area. In 1965, the Ruhr University was opened, the first modern university in the Ruhr area and the first to be founded in Germany since World War II. Since the seventies, Bochum's industry has moved from heavy industry to the service sector. Between 1960 and 1980, the coal mines all closed. Other industries, such as automotive, compensated for the loss of jobs. The Opel Astra was assembled at the Opel Bochum plant; however, by 2009, the factory was in serious financial difficulties and in December 2012, Opel announced that it would stop vehicle production at the Bochum plant in 2016.

In the course of a comprehensive community reform in 1975, Wattenscheid, a formerly independent city, was integrated into the city of Bochum. A local referendum against the integration failed. In 2007, the new synagogue of the Jewish community of Bochum, Herne und Hattingen was opened. In 2008, Nokia closed down its production plant, causing the loss of thousands of jobs, both at the plant and at local suppliers. 20,000 people showed up to protest against the closing. Within months, the Canadian high-tech company, Research in Motion, announced plans to open a research facility, its first outside Canada, adding several hundred jobs.

=== Population development ===
Historical population

Year	Pop.	±% p.a.
1500	1,000	—
1750	1,449	+0.15%
1871	21,192	+2.24%
1900	65,554	+3.97%
1910	136,931	+7.64%
1919	142,760	+0.46%
1925	156,762	+1.57%
1933	314,546	+9.10%
1939	305,485	−0.49%
1950	289,804	−0.48%
1961	367,338	+2.18%
1965	435,952	+4.37%

Year	Pop.	±% p.a.
1970	424,966	−0.51%
1975	414,849	−0.48%
1980	400,767	−0.69%
1985	382,071	−0.95%
1990	396,486	+0.74%
1995	400,395	+0.20%
2000	391,147	−0.47%
2005	385,626	−0.28%
2010	374,737	−0.57%
2015	364,742	−0.54%
2020	364,454	−0.02%
2025	358,880	−0.31%

Source: Landesdatabank Nordrhein-Westfalen (1965-2025)

== Places of interest ==
=== Architecture ===
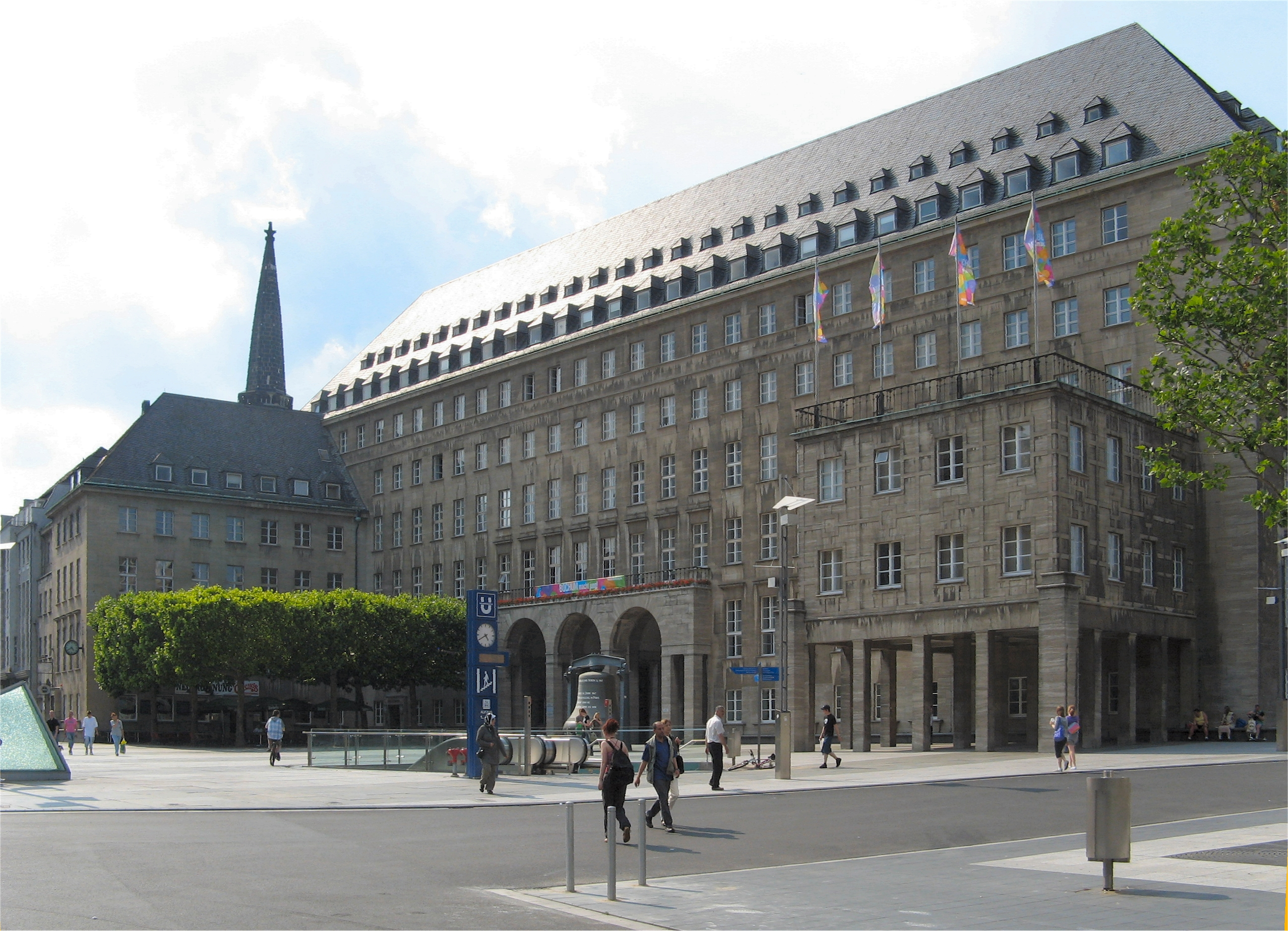
City Hall

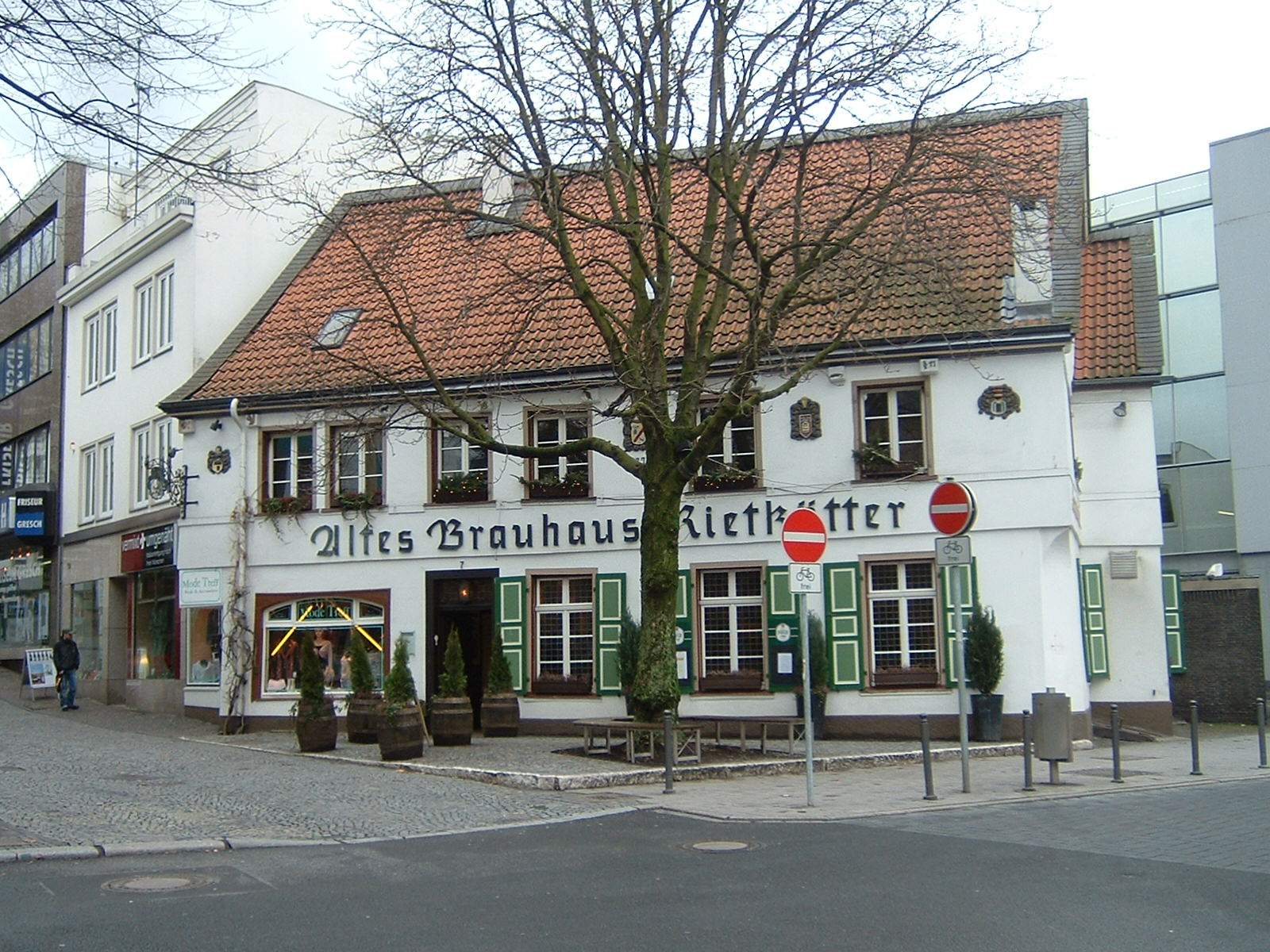
Altes Brauhaus

- Bochum City Hall was built from 1927 to 1931 and was designed by architect Karl Roth as a modern office building, but in the Renaissance style, reflecting the industrial era's middle class, inventions and discoveries. There were statues of bronze and stone, and in the city council chambers, a bell tower. The ornate décor gave the Nazis an excuse to hound the then-mayor Otto Ruer, who was of Jewish descent, driving him to suicide in 1933. Most of the bronze statues were melted down for the war effort and the stone carvings were damaged by the war, save for some small lion's heads over the entrance. Also left undamaged are two themed courtyard fountains made by August Vogel, the "Fountain of Beauty" and the "Fountain of Happiness", as well as Augusto Vasaris' florentine main entrance, which displays the motto, In Labore Honos (In labour lies honour). In 1951, a set of 28 chimes was installed, manufactured in Bochum. Known for their clarity of tone, they are the first cast steel chimes in the world. In front of the city hall is a large bell that was made by the Bochum "Verein für Bergbau und Gusstahlfabrikation AG" (Association for Mining and Cast Steel Manufacturing). Displayed at the 1867 Paris World's Fair, it has a diameter of 3.13 metres (10.3 ft) and weighs 15 tonnes (15 long tons; 17 short tons). It was damaged during World War II and can no longer be rung.
- Altes Brauhaus Rietkötter, the Old Rietkötter Brewing House is one of the oldest houses in Bochum, dating from 1630. Originally a private home, it became a brewery in 1777. After nearly being torn down after the war, it now has preservation status and today houses a restaurant, where they still brew their own beer.
- The Kaufhaus Kortum department store dates from 1913 and was built as one of the nearly 20 regional stores owned by Alsberg Bros. (Gebr. Alsberg, AG) of Cologne. During the Nazi era, these stores were taken away from their Jewish owners and put into non-Jewish hands. Today, the "Kaufhaus Kortum" building has preservation status and houses an electronics store.
- The Friedrich-Lueg-Haus was built in 1924–1925 as the first high-rise building in Bochum. Contracted by the Lueg Company, the seven-story building was designed by the architect Emil Pohle. It suffered a fire during a bombing raid in 1944 and was renovated after the war. Today, the upper floors are small offices and internet companies. The seven-theatre Bochum Union Cinema rents the ground floor, showing a variety of domestic and international films.
- Mutter Wittig is a baroque-style building in the town centre, originally opened as a bakery and inn in 1870. Damaged in World War II, its façade is protected by preservation status. It houses a restaurant and its windows are decorated with displays of old Bochum.
- Sparkasse Bochum (Bochum Savings Bank) is a town landmark designed by the architect Wilhelm Kreis. It opened in 1928 and was emblematic of the modern era. It was heavily damaged during the war, but was afterwards restored to its former appearance.
- The Schlegel Tower is the only remaining structure of the once-important Schlegel brewery, which closed in 1980.
- The Jahrhunderthalle (Hall of the Century) is the former gas and power station of a steel mill built at the turn of the 20th century. With the closing of the mill, the plant was renovated and turned into a three-hall concert and event site with an industrial ambiance.
- Dahlhauser Heide is an example of social welfare provided by wealthy German industrialists for their workers. Built in the early 1900s by the Krupp family for their coal mine workers, the modest and tastefully designed two-family houses were to enable self-sufficiency by providing gardens and a stall for a pig or a goat, "the miner's cow". The estate, which has the appearance of a small, rural town, gained preservation status in the 1970s.
- Blankenstein Castle was built in the 13th century by Count Adolf I of the Mark. Though located in Hattingen, it is owned by Bochum and has a significant history. On 8 June 1321, Count Engelbert II of the Mark granted Bochum its town charter there. Today, only the gate and one tower remain.
- Haus Kemnade is a moated castle. Though located in the town of Hattingen, the castle is property of the city of Bochum in 1921. Documents regarding its earliest dates of construction have been lost; it is first mentioned in 1393. Parts of the castle were built during the Renaissance and baroque periods. The castle's location on the banks of the Ruhr river was changed when the flood of 1486 receded on the opposite side, cutting the castle off from the neighbouring village. The castle remained in private hands till 1921, when it was deeded to the city of Bochum. In 1961, a museum of local history was installed, including a large collection of 16th to 20th century musical instruments. A collection of East Asian objects is also now located there, as well as a satellite of the Bochum Museum and an art exhibition space. There is also a restaurant on site. Behind the castle is a timber-framed farmhouse from 1800, now a museum exhibiting farm life from the past.
- The Exzenterhaus is a commercial office building which is the tallest building in Bochum at 90.5 metres. It was constructed on top of World War II era bunker, with the more modern section of the building rising 15 storeys above the top of the bunker. The top 15 floors are split into three, five storey sections, each which cantilever up to 4.5 metres, giving the impression of twisting structure.

==== Religious architecture ====
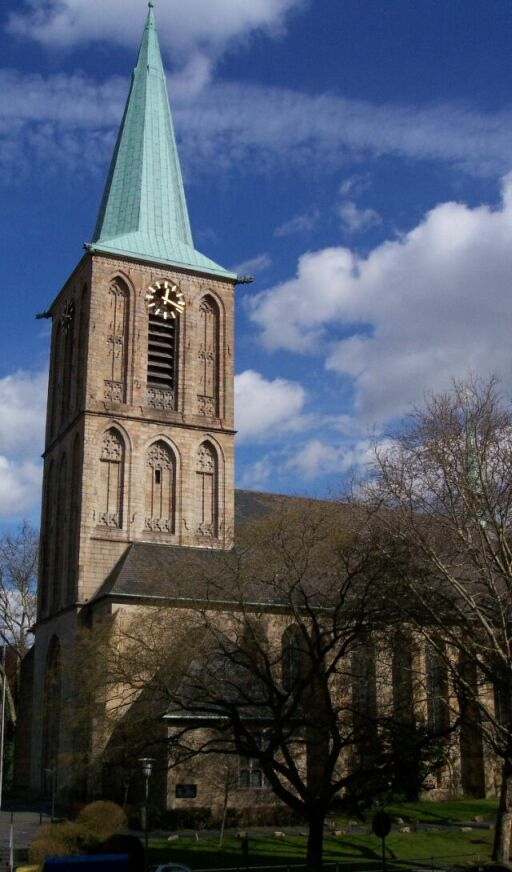
Church founded by Charlemagne

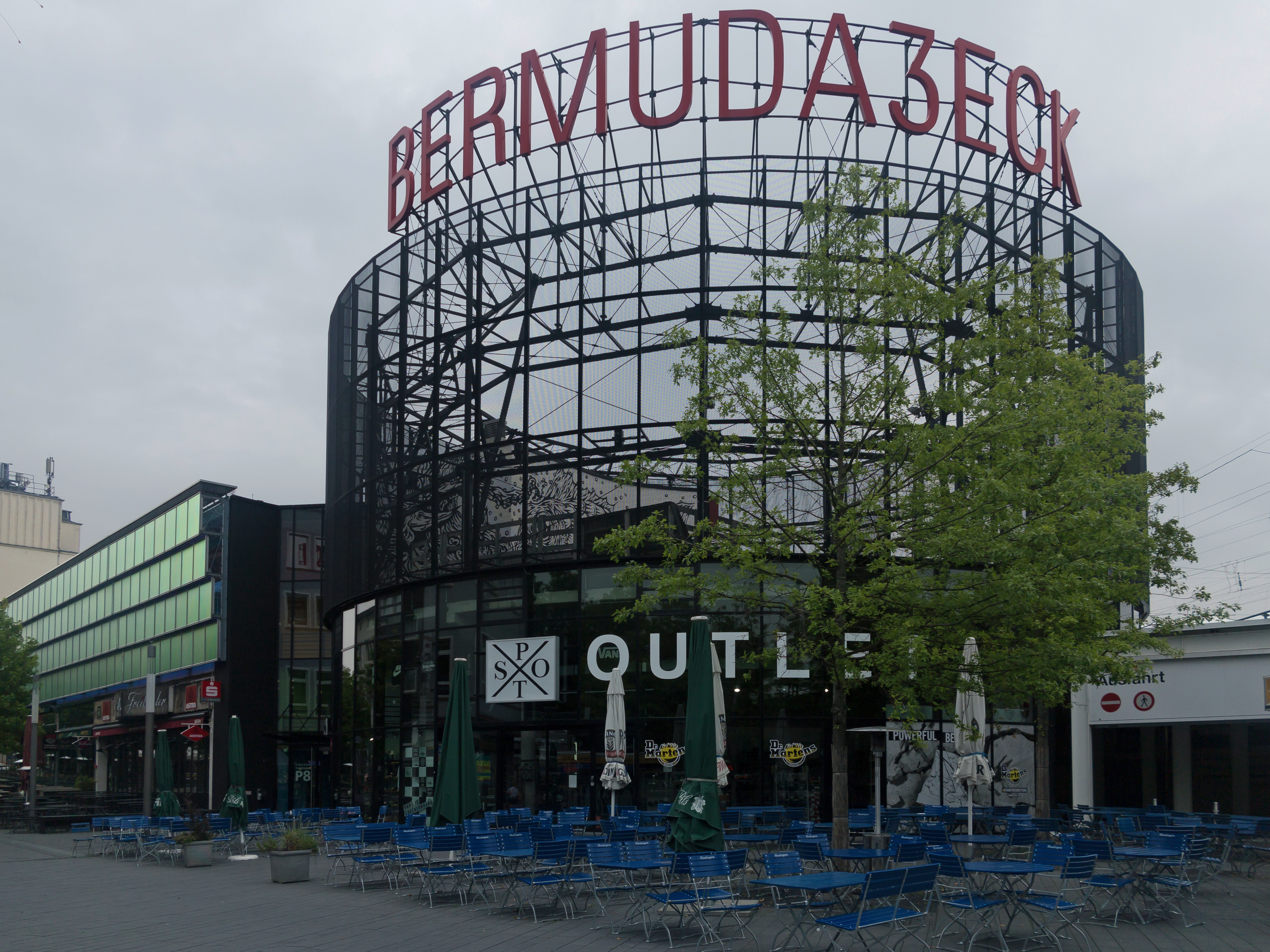
Bochum-Mitte, das Bermuda3eck

- Propsteikirche St. Peter und Paul is the oldest church in Bochum, built between 785 and 800 by Charlemagne. It was rebuilt in the 11th century, but was severely damaged by fire in 1517. In 1547, it was again rebuilt, this time in the late Gothic style. The 68-metre (223 ft) high bell tower is one of the landmarks of Bochum. The interior includes a baptismal font from 1175, the reliquary shrine of St. Perpetua and her slave Felicitas, and a high altar with a crucifix from 1352.
- Pauluskirche is the main Protestant church of the city. After the Reformation, both Catholics and Lutherans shared the Propsteikirche, often contentiously. In 1655, the Lutherans began to build their own church with the help of donations from the Dutch Republic, Sweden, Courland and Denmark. The church was heavily damaged in a bombing raid on 12 June 1943 and was later rebuilt after the war. Next to the church is a monument to peace. A statue of an old woman searching for a loved one, it is also a memorial to the 4 November 1944 bombing raid on Bochum. Hans Ehrenberg served as minister here, until he was arrested and sent to Sachsenhausen by the Nazis.
- The Christuskirche, built in the neo-Gothic style, opened in 1879 and was among the most beautiful churches in Europe. In 1931, the room in the steeple was extended to a cenotaph for those killed in World War I. During an air raid in 1943, the church was destroyed, except for the steeple. After the war, the ruins were integrated into a new, modern structure and the steeple became a memorial dedicated to peace and understanding among nations.
- The neo-Gothic Marienkirche, built between 1868 and 1872, was heavily damaged in World War II (see photo above), but was rebuilt after the war. It is now closed and scheduled for demolition. The stained glass windows have been removed and it has fallen victim to vandalism.
- Stiepeler Dorfkirche is over 1000 years old and was commemorated by a stamp in 2008. A small church consisting of one room was built by Countess Imma von Stiepel. Between 1130 and 1170, the old church was replaced by a Romanesque basilica. Today, the steeple and transept remain. Between 1150 and 1200, the interior walls and ceiling were decorated with a number of Romanesque paintings.
- The new synagogue, which opened in 2007, consists of a white cube and stands in contrast to the round shape of the planetarium next door. The façade shows overall a variation on the Solomon's Seal achieved by relocated brickstones. The interior is graced with a gold-coloured canopy.

=== Parks and gardens ===
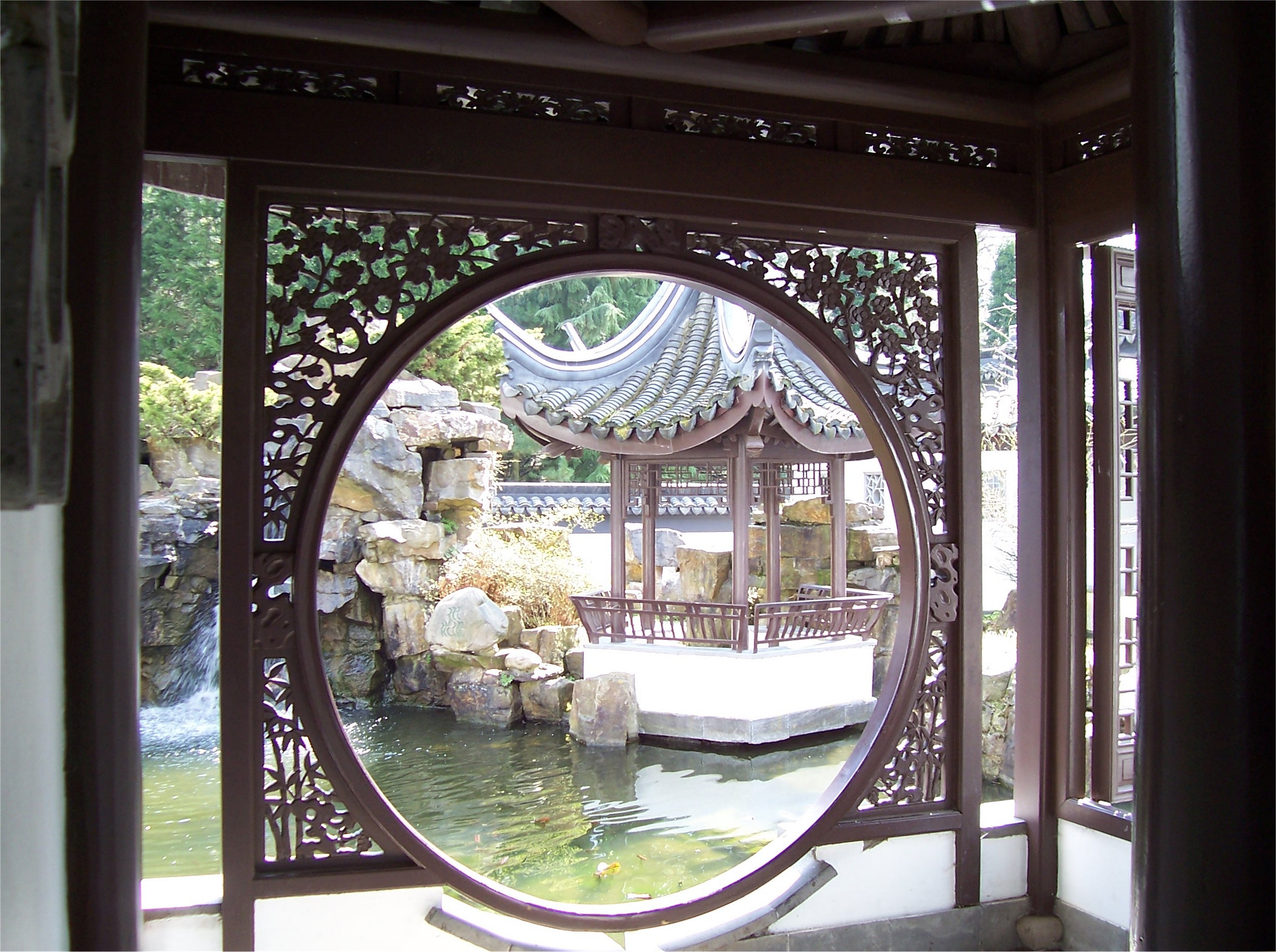
Chinese garden at the Ruhr University Botanical Gardens

Bochum has a municipal zoo, a large municipal park and a number of other gardens and parks. The Ruhr University Botanical Gardens has thousands of plants from all over the world. Among others there is a tropical garden, a cactus garden, and a Chinese garden designed in the southern Chinese style, the only one of its kind in Germany.

The Geological Garden was the first of its kind in Germany. The nearly 4-acre (16,000 m^{2}) park is the site of an old coal mine, the Zeche Friederika, which operated from 1750 to 1907. In 1962, the property came under environmental protection and a decade later was turned into a geological garden.

Other scenic areas include the West Park, Lake Kemnade, Lake Ümmingen and the municipal forest, Weitmarer Holz.

== Society and culture ==
=== Leisure and entertainment ===
Bochum is a cultural centre of the Ruhr region. There is a municipal theatre, the Schauspielhaus Bochum, and about 20 smaller theatres and stages. The musical Starlight Express, which opened in 1988, is the longest-running musical in Germany.

==== Bermudadreieck ====
The Bermudadreieck (Bermuda Triangle), in the city center of Bochum, functions as the town's nightlife hub. Around sixty different bars and restaurants are located there, serving multicultural cuisine such as Japanese, Chinese, Indian, Italian, Spanish and German gastronomic specialties. Close to the Bermudadreieck is the Anneliese Brost Musikforum Ruhr, opened in 2016.

==== Annual events ====
- Jumble Sale – on the third Saturday of the month, in front of city hall
- April/May: Maiabendfest – local festival, hundreds of years old
- May: Steam Festival (every other year [even or odd?])
- May: FIDENA puppet theatre festival
- June events:

Rubissimo, Ruhr University's summer festival
Kemnade International
Extraschicht – Night of Industrial Heritage (many locations all over the Ruhr area)

- June/July: VfL for Fun – summer festival for Bochum's football (soccer) team, VfL Bochum 1848
- July: Bochum Total (Music Festival) – starts on the first weekend after school lets out
- July or August: Bochum kulinarisch – culinary treats from various cuisines, held the last weekend of summer vacation
- August: Bochumer Musiksommer, Bochum's Summer of Music
- September: Open Flair – international cabaret and street theatre
- October: Oktobermarkt – October Market
- October/November: Bochumer Bachtage – music of composer Johann Sebastian Bach
- October/November: Ruhrgebiets-Antiquariatstag – used and antique book sale
- November: Children's and Teenagers' Theatre
- December: Weihnachtsmarkt – Christmas Market – month-long open air market spread over the heart of downtown Bochum, includes performance stages

=== Museums ===
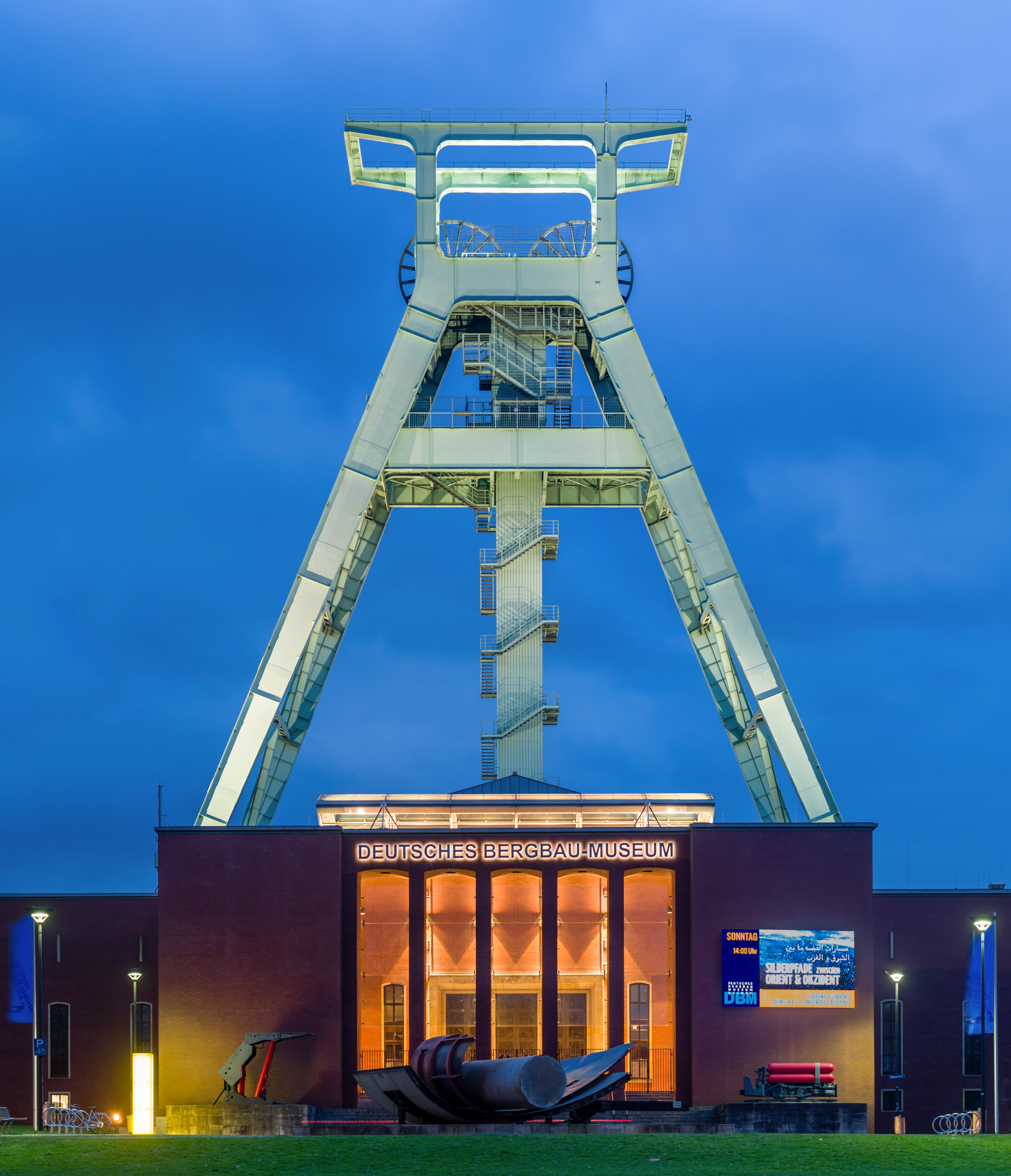
Bergbaumuseum Bochum

- The German Mining Museum is a museum about mining technology, complete with pithead tower.
- Railway Museum and Station Dahlhausen in the borough of Dahlhausen. Dr.-C.-Otto-Straße 191
- Zeiss Planetarium
- At the city's border with Herne-(Röhlinghausen), is the former mine Zeche Hannover with the Malakow Tower and engine hall. There is a steam-powered winding engine, which is operated at events.
- Zeche Knirps ("Small Boy Mine") located on the ground of Mine Hannover. It gives children the opportunity to experience the processes in a mine.
- Museum of local history Helf's Farm, Address: In den Höfen 37
- Farmhouse Museum located on the grounds of moated Kemnade Castle
- Museum of historic medical tools in the Malokos-Tower of former Mine Julius-Philipp from 1875. Address: Malakowturm, Markstraße 258a, 44799 Bochum
- Telefonmuseum, Karl-Lange-Str. 17
- Kunstmuseum Bochum, Kortumstraße 147, 44787 Bochum

=== Art galleries ===
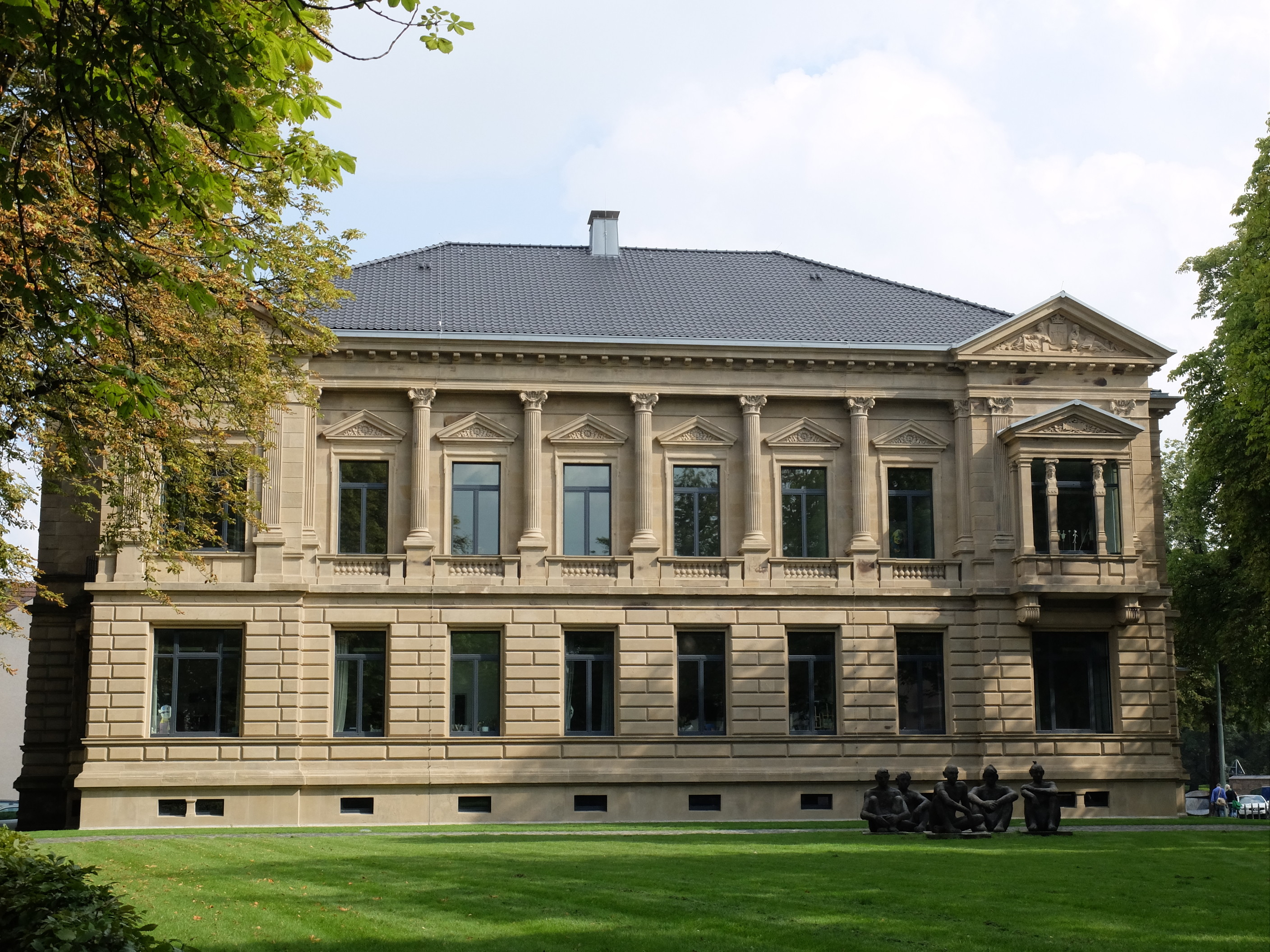
Museum of Art

- Museum of Art: The collection's focus is central and eastern European avant garde art, German expressionism, surrealism and outsider art. Kortumstraße 147, Bochum
- Ruhr University art collection: Modern art meets the classical. Marble and bronze portraits of Greek and Roman emperors, collection of antique Greek vases from the 9th to 4th century, B.C. Universitätsstraße 150, Bochum
- Schlieker House: In the former apartment and studio of German painter Hans-Jürgen Schlieker (1924–2004); changing exhibitions. Paracelsusweg 16, 44801 Bochum
- Situation Kunst: (Situation Art) Located at "Haus Weitmar" park. Indoor permanent exhibition with works by Gianni Colombo, Dan Flavin, Gotthard Graupner, Norbert Kricke, Lee Ufan, François Morellet, Maria Nordman, David Rabinowitch, Arnulf Rainer, Dirk Reinartz, Ad Reinhardt, Robert Ryman, Richard Serra, Jan J. Schoonhoven; also the Africa and Asia Room. Nevelstraße 29c, 44795 Bochum
- Musical Instrument Collection, Hans and Hede Grumbt: Large collection of musical instruments, also the clarinet collection of Johan van Kalker. An der Kemnade 10, 45527 Hattingen
- Ostasiatika Collection Ehrich: Kurt Ehrich's east Asian collection of Japanese netsuke, belt buckles, a display of the seven "lucky gods" and other additional objects. An der Kemnade 10, 45527 Hattingen,
- ER MindArts: Contemporary Art online Gallery was established in Bochum in 2014. www.ermindarts.com

=== Public art ===
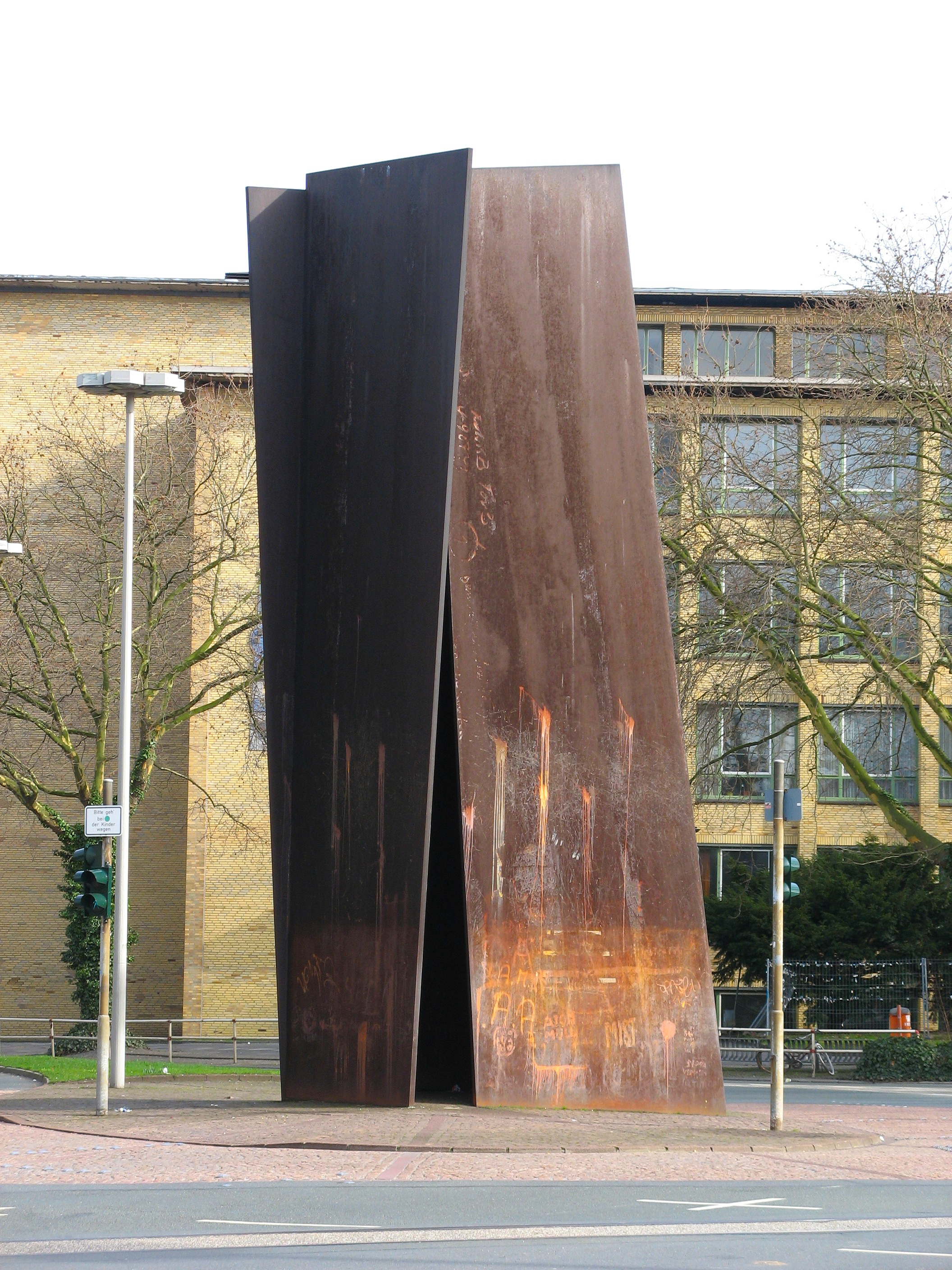
"Terminal" by sculptor Richard Serra

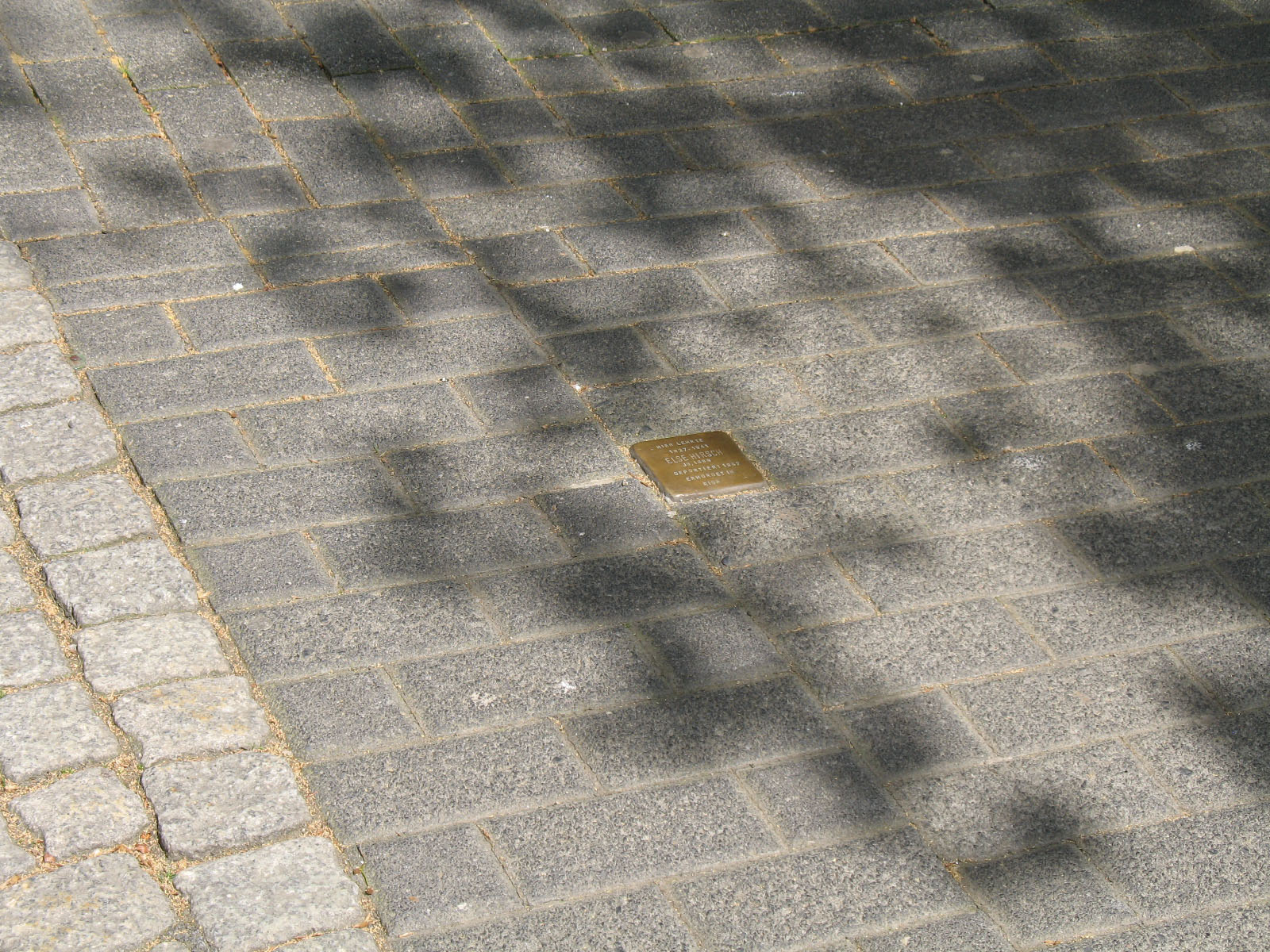
Stolperstein for Else Hirsch on pavement in Bochum

- Richard Serra's sculpture, "Terminal" is located in the town centre, near the central station. It consists of four 12-metre (over 39 feet) tall steel plates.
- Ulrich Rückriem's sculpture, "Ohne Titel" (titled "Untitled"), in front of the Kunstmuseum Bochum (Museum of Art).
- Memorial of the herdsman at Massenberg-Boulevard: Memorial for "the good old times", when Bochum was a farmers town. The herdsmans of the town guided until 1870 the cattle of the citizens to the "Vöde", a grassland outside the town limits, a part of it is today the municipal park. Local legends say it is "the last herdsman Fritz Kortebusch". But he died 1866, nevertheless he done this job for a long time.
- Engelbert statue in the front of the Propsteikirche. In former times it was a fountain with statue at the Kortumstrasse. It is for memory of Earl Engelbert III, who founded the so-called Maiabendfest. It is often assumed that the statue shows his grandfather Engelbert II, who granted extended market rights to Bochum in 1321.
- Jobsiade-fountain at Husemann-Square. Shown is a scene of the examination of Hieronymus Jobs, the main character of the "Jobsiade", a comical poem of the poet Carl Armold Kortum.
- "The envolvement of the City", sculpture of Karl-Henning Seemann at Schützenbahn street.
- Collection of sculptures inside the municipal park.
- The bell in front of the city hall serves as a reminder of the improvement of steel-casting in Bochum. The bell was built in 1867 for the Paris World's Fair.
- Stolpersteine (literally, "stumbling stones") are small, cobblestone-sized, brass commemorative plaques which are set in sidewalks all over Europe, marking the homes or work places of Jews and others who were arrested and murdered during the Nazi era. There are 38 stolpersteine in Bochum.
- Cenotaph for the victims of the mine disaster at "Vereinigte Präsident" in 1936 at the graveyard in Bochum-Hamme. The sculpture was created by Wilhelm Wulff. Strict guidelines for artwork were in effect during the Nazi dictatorship, yet the sculpture follows only a few of them. The inscription also avoids typical Nazi phraseology.

=== Music ===
Founded in 1919, Bochum's orchestra, the Bochumer Symphoniker, has developed over the course of its history into one of the most important concert orchestras in western Germany. Since October 28, 2016, the Anneliese Brost Musikforum Ruhr has been a permanent venue. Tung-Chieh Chuang has been general music director of the Bochum Symphony Orchestra and artistic director of the Anneliese Brost Musikforum Ruhr since the 2021/2022 season. In 2026, he was succeeded by [./Https://de.wikipedia.org/wiki/Aurel_Dawidiuk Aurel Dawidyuk]. The Bochum Philharmonic Choir gives about four to five concerts a year and usually performs together with the Bochum Symphony Orchestra. In one of the venues, the Audimax of the Ruhr University Bochum, there is also one of the most modern organs from the Klais Orgelbau with 82 registers.

The free rock festival Bochum Total has been taking place in Bochum city center since 1986. With 900,000 spectators, it is now one of the largest music events in Europe.

Since the summer of 1995, the Kunstwerkstatt <Art Workshop> am Hellweg, a former carpenter's workshop, has hosted a wide variety of concerts all year round, from medieval music to baroque music, from Bach to jazz and boogie-woogie. In this informal setting, music fans have the opportunity not only to "sit in the front row", but also to come into direct contact with the artists. Often artists also play here who can be heard in the Carnegie Hall, in the Concertgebouw, in the Berlin Philharmonic or in the Great Hall of the Tchaikovsky Conservatory. Again and again. The initiators, Dr. Reinhard Cebulla and his wife Anna, received the Badge of Honor from the city of Bochum in 2013 and the Wattenscheid St. Gertrudis Prize in 2014.

=== Sports ===
- The football club VfL Bochum played in the first Division from 1971 to 1992, and from 1992 to 2010 was alternating almost every year between first and second Division, but mostly first. From 2010 to 2021 it played in the second Division (2. Bundesliga) before being promoted back to the first Division for the 2021–2022 season.
- VfL AstroStars Bochum – professional basketball team. Home arena is the Rundsporthalle.
- Sparkassen Giro Bochum – annual road bike race.

== Located companies ==
The German headquarters of the United Cinemas International Multiplex GmbH has its seat in Bochum.

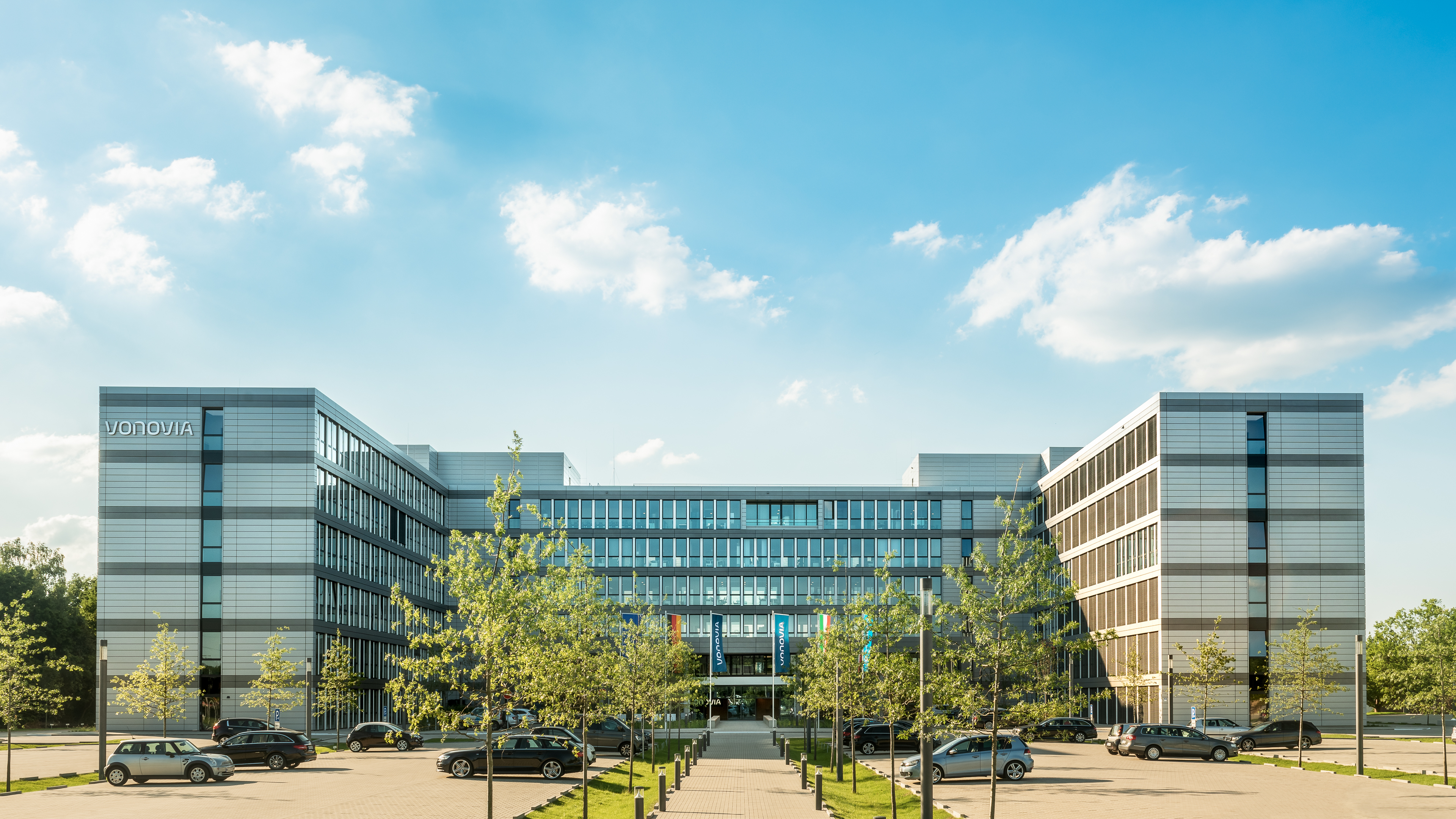
Vonovia headquarters in Bochum

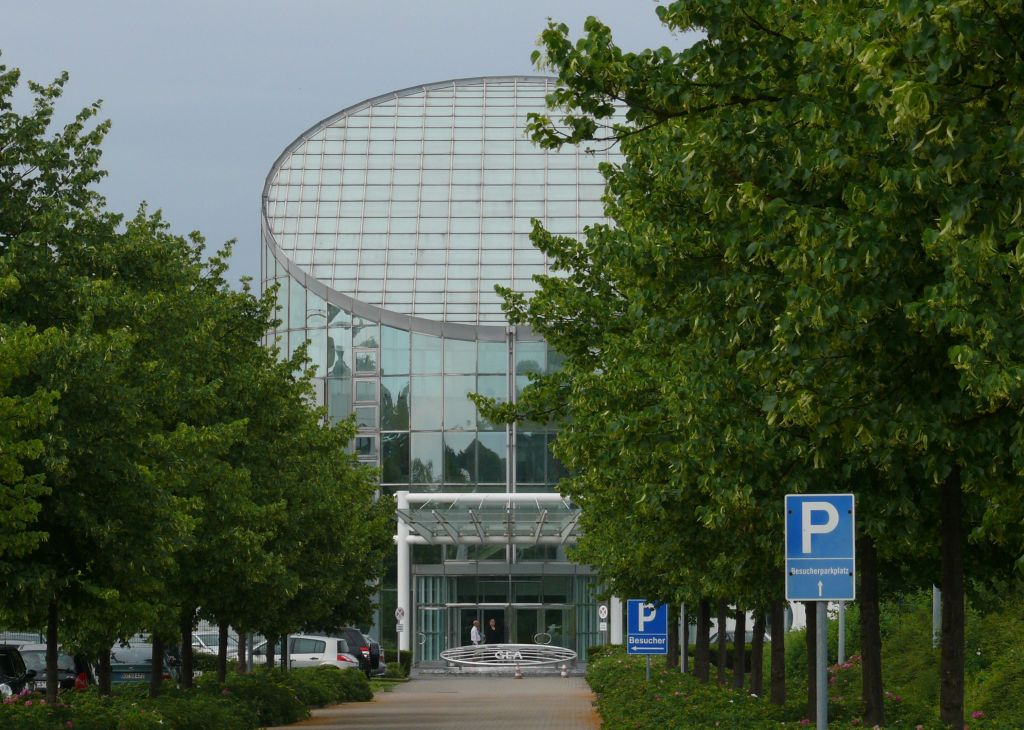
GEA Group's former headquarters in Bochum Hofstede

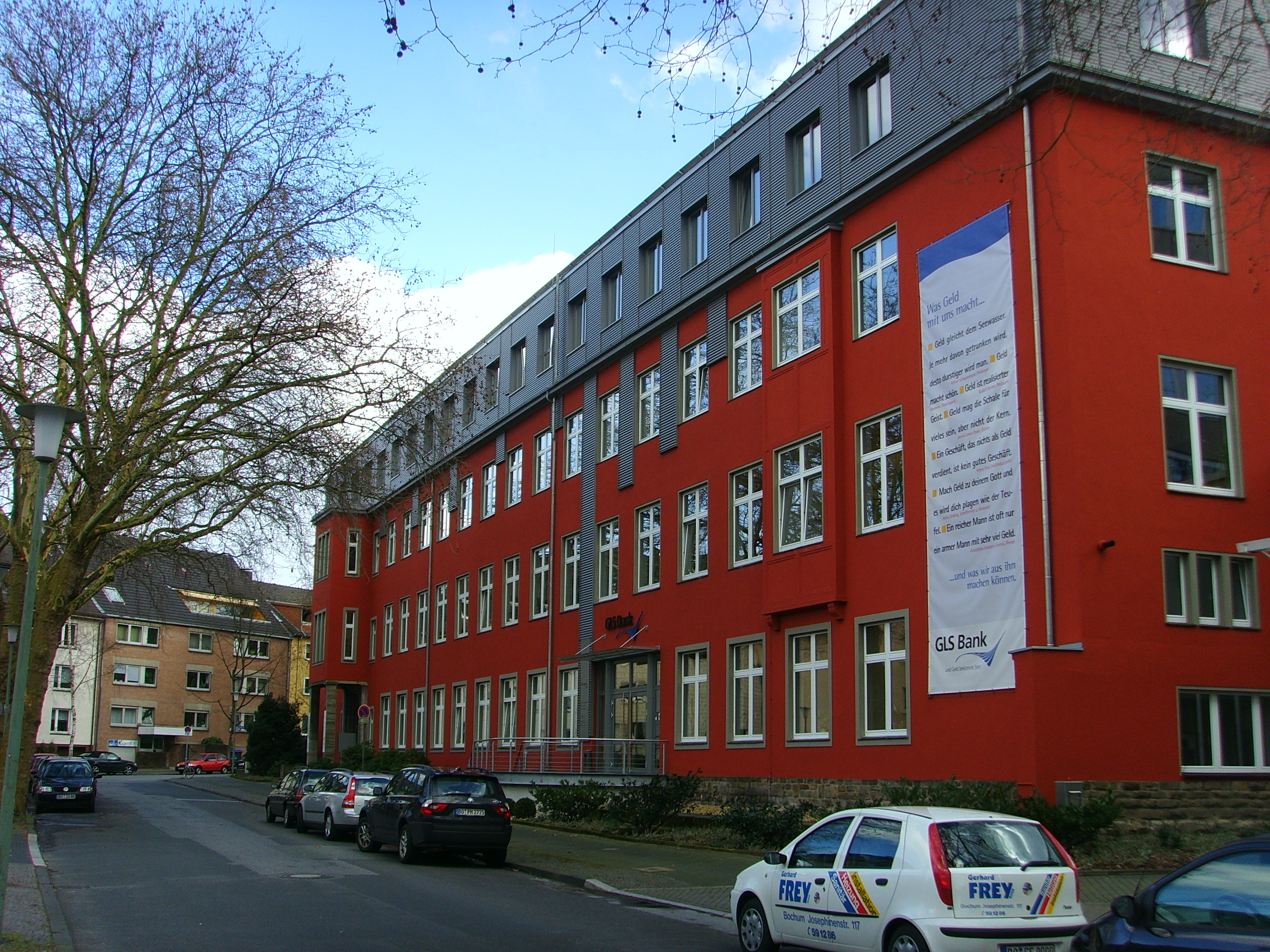
GLS Bank, main administration

- ARAL AG (Head Office), an enterprise of the Deutsche BP AG
- Bochumer Eisenhütte Heintzmann GmbH & Co. KG – Mining, tunnelling and heat treatment
- Bochumer Verein – formerly the "Inoxum" part of the ThyssenKrupp enterprise, now Outokumpu Nirosta
- Bogestra (Head Office) – Bochum-Gelsenkirchener Straßenbahnen AG, local traffic firm
- Sparkasse Bochum – public-law bank
- Vonovia – Germany's largest residential property company (headquarters)
- Dr. C. Otto & Comp. – fire-proof materials
- Faber Lotto-Service GmbH
- G Data CyberDefense AG (Head Office) – contractor of IT security solutions. well-known product: G Data AntiVirus
- GEA Group AG founded in Bochum, headquarter moved to Düsseldorf in 2011
- Gebr. Eickhoff Maschinenfabrik und Eisengießerei GmbH
- GLS Bank
- I.S.T. Services
- Johnson Controls, just-in-time industry supplier for parts of the car, especially for Opel
- Meteomedia GmbH (Head Office) – private weather service, German subsidiary of the Swiss Meteomedia ag
- Möbel Hardeck – furniture shop
- Office Jack- home and office furniture shop
- Privatbrauerei Moritz Fiege, middle-large regional beer brewery
- QVC – call centre
- Roeser Medical
- ThyssenKrupp
- United Cinemas International
- USB Umweltservice Bochum GmbH – municipal disposal firm (100% subsidiary of the Bochumer Stadtwerke)
- Wollschläger Gruppe (Head Office) – trading house in the sector tooling equipment and machines (bankrupt)

== Transport ==
=== Roads ===
Bochum is connected to the Autobahn network by the A 40, A 43 and A 448 autobahns. In addition, Bochum has a ring road, built to expressway standards, consisting of four segments; the Donezk, Oviedo, Nordhausen and Sheffield-Ring roads. It serves as a three-quarter loop around central Bochum and begins and ends at Autobahn A40. Ruhr University Bochum is also served by an expressway running from the Nordhausen-Ring to Autobahn A43. Until 2012, a new interchange (Dreieck Bochum-West) between the Donezk-Ring and Autobahn A40 is being constructed within tight parameters due to the existence of a nearby factory.

Apart from the autobahns and expressways, there is also a small ring road around the centre of Bochum, where most roads radiating out of Bochum begin. Most main roads in Bochum are multi-lane roads with traffic lights. Bochum is also served by the Bundesstraße 51 and Bundesstraße 226. B51 runs to Herne and Hattingen, and B226 runs to Gelsenkirchen and Witten.

=== Railways ===
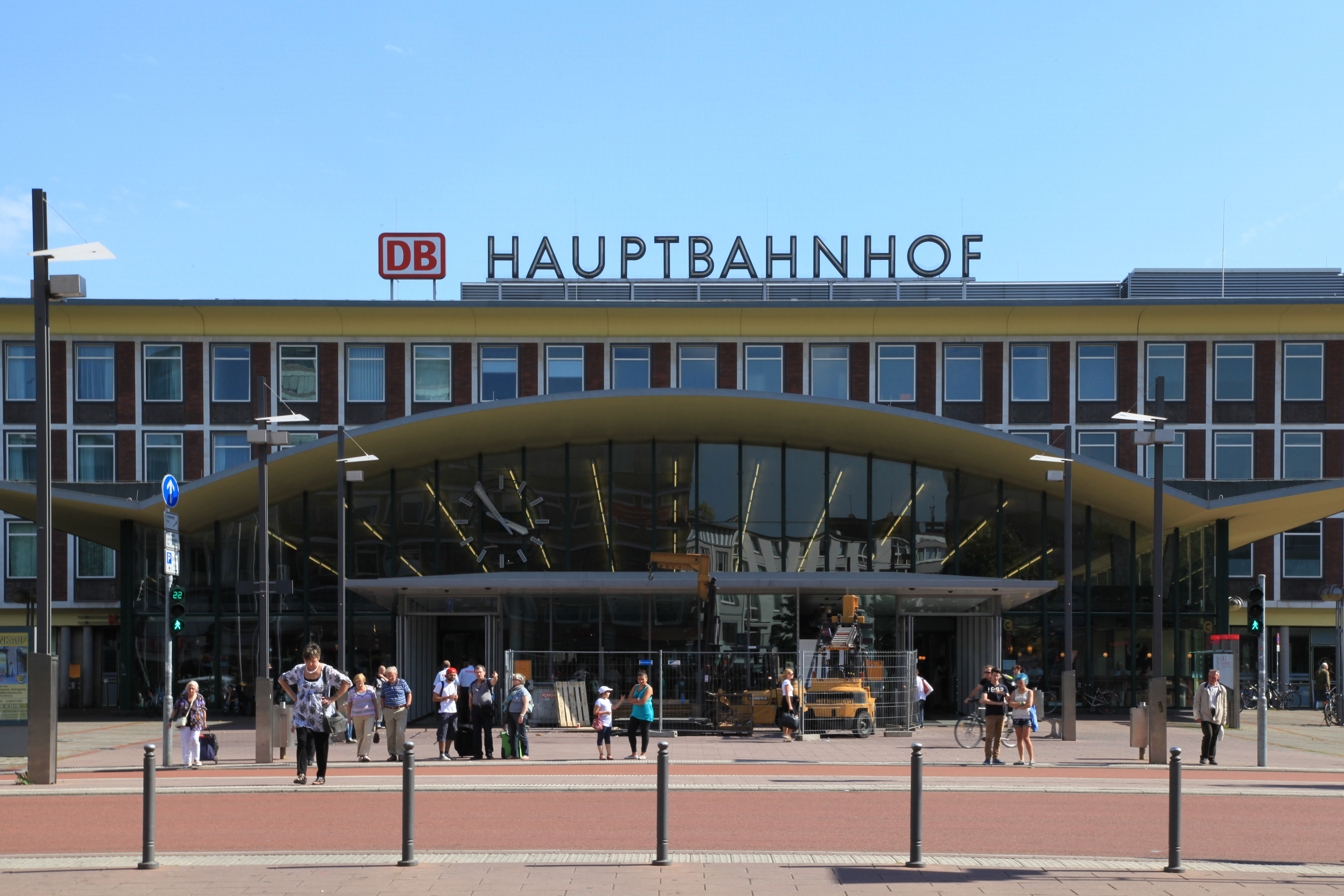
Bochum Hauptbahnhof, the city's main railway station

Bochum has a central station situated on the line from Duisburg to Dortmund, connecting the city to the long-distance network of Deutsche Bahn as well as to the Rhine-Ruhr S-Bahn network.

=== Bus, tram, underground ===
Local service is supplied mainly by BOGESTRA, a joint venture handling transportation between the cities of Bochum and Gelsenkirchen. The Bochum Stadtbahn is a single underground line connecting the University of Bochum to Herne, and the Bochum/Gelsenkirchen tramway network is made up of several lines, partially underground, connecting to Gelsenkirchen, Hattingen and Witten. Public transport in the city is priced according to the fare system of the VRR transport association.

=== Waterways ===
As one of the few Ruhr area cities, Bochum is not directly connected with the German waterway net; the closest link is in the more northern located Herne at the Rhine-Herne Canal. In the south the border of Bochum is marked by the Ruhr. Up to the first half of the 19th century it was one of the most-travelled rivers in Europe and was mainly used for coal departure. Aside from cruise ships, it is no longer used for commercial navigation.

=== Air ===
The closest airports are Essen/Mülheim Airport (27 km), Dortmund Airport (31 km) and Düsseldorf Airport (47 km). To reach the airport in Düsseldorf, there are ICE, InterCity, RE and S railway lines. Other reachable airports are the Cologne Bonn Airport, the Weeze Airport, the Münster Airport and the Paderborn Lippstadt Airport.

== Education ==
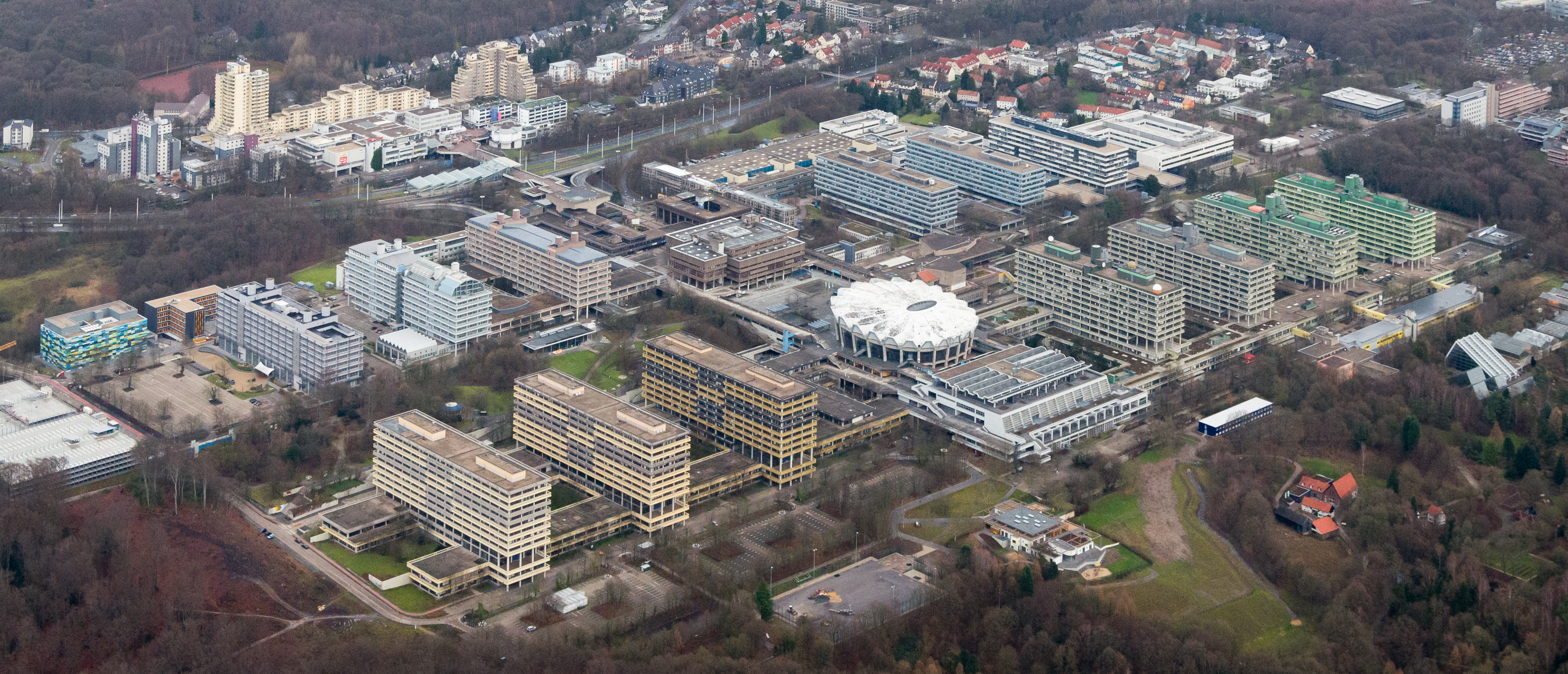
Aerial view of the Ruhr University Bochum

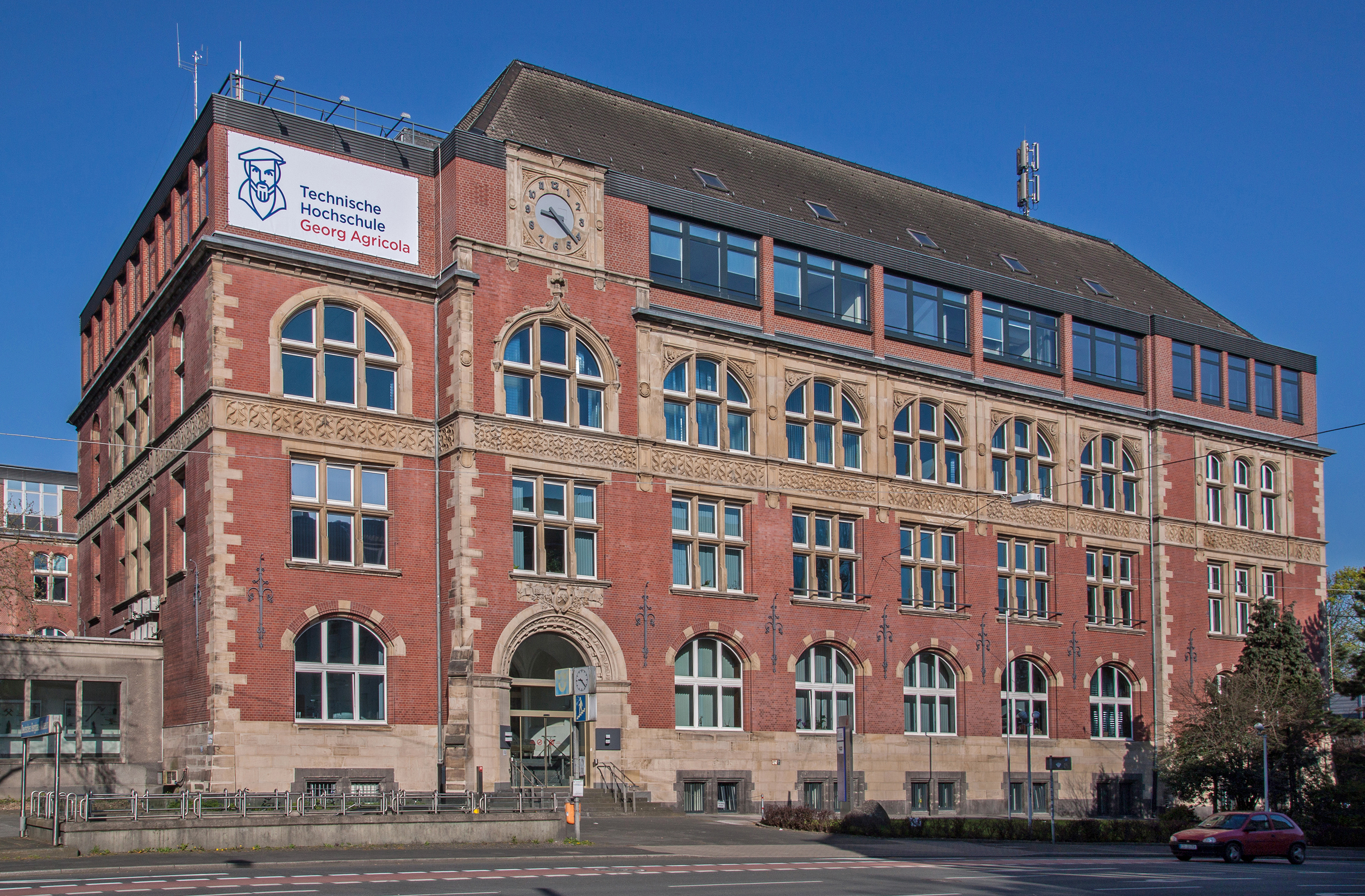
Main building of the Georg Agricola University of Applied Sciences

=== Higher education ===
- Ruhr University Bochum, founded 1965
- Bochum University of Applied Sciences (Hochschule Bochum, formerly Fachhochschule Bochum)
- Georg Agricola University of Applied Sciences (TH Georg Agricola)
- Protestant University of Applied Sciences, Rheinland-Westphalia-Lippe (Evangelische FH Rheinland-Westfalen-Lippe)
- Schauspielschule Bochum (Bochum drama school)
- College of the Federal Social Security, Department of Social Insurance for Seafarers (Fachhochschule des Bundes der Sozialversicherung, Abteilung Knappschaft-Bahn-See)
- University of Health Sciences (Hochschule für Gesundheit)

=== Elementary and secondary schools ===
There are 61 primary schools, 9 Hauptschulen ("general schools") and 14 special schools.

In addition, there are 11 preparatory (British: grammar) schools ("Gymnasien"), 5 comprehensive schools ("Gesamtschulen"), 8 Realschulen and 2 private Waldorf schools.

"Gymnasien" – preparatory schools (British: grammar school):

- Goethe-Schule Bochum
- Graf-Engelbert-Schule
- Heinrich-von-Kleist-Schule
- Hellweg-Schule
- Hildegardis-Schule
- Lessing-Schule
- Märkische Schule
- Neues Gymnasium Bochum (school formed by merger of the former Albert-Einstein-Schule and Gymnasium am Ostring)
- Schiller-Schule
- Theodor-Körner-Schule

"Gesamtschulen" – comprehensive schools:

- Erich Kästner-Gesamtschule Schule
- Heinrich-Böll-Gesamtschule
- Maria Sibylla Merian-Gesamtschule
- Willy-Brandt-Gesamtschule
- Matthias-Claudius-Schulen

Realschulen – high schools:

- Anne-Frank-Schule
- Annette-von-Droste-Hülshoff-Schule
- Franz-Dinnendahl-Schule
- Hans-Böckler-Schule
- Helene-Lange-Schule
- Hugo-Schultz-Schule
- Pestalozzi-Schule
- Realschule Höntrop
- Freie-Schule Bochum (with elementary school)

Waldorf schools:

- Rudolf Steiner Schule Bochum
- Widar Schule Wattenscheid

== Twin towns – sister cities ==
Bochum is twinned with:

- Sheffield, England, United Kingdom (1950)
- Oviedo, Spain (1980)
- Donetsk, Ukraine (1987)
- Nordhausen, Germany (1990)
- Tsukuba, Japan (2019)

There is a major road in Bochum named Sheffield-Ring after its sister city Sheffield, England. There is also a long section of dual carriageway on the south-western edge of Sheffield, between the suburbs of Meadowhead and Gleadless, named Bochum Parkway.

== Notable people ==
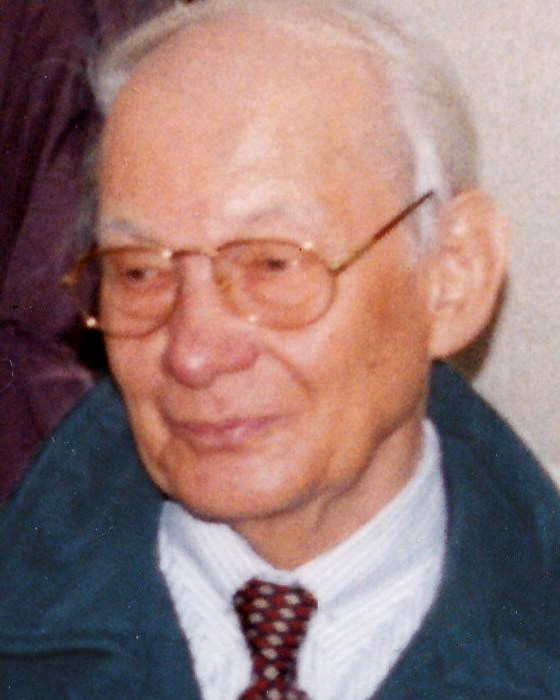
Manfred Eigen, 1996

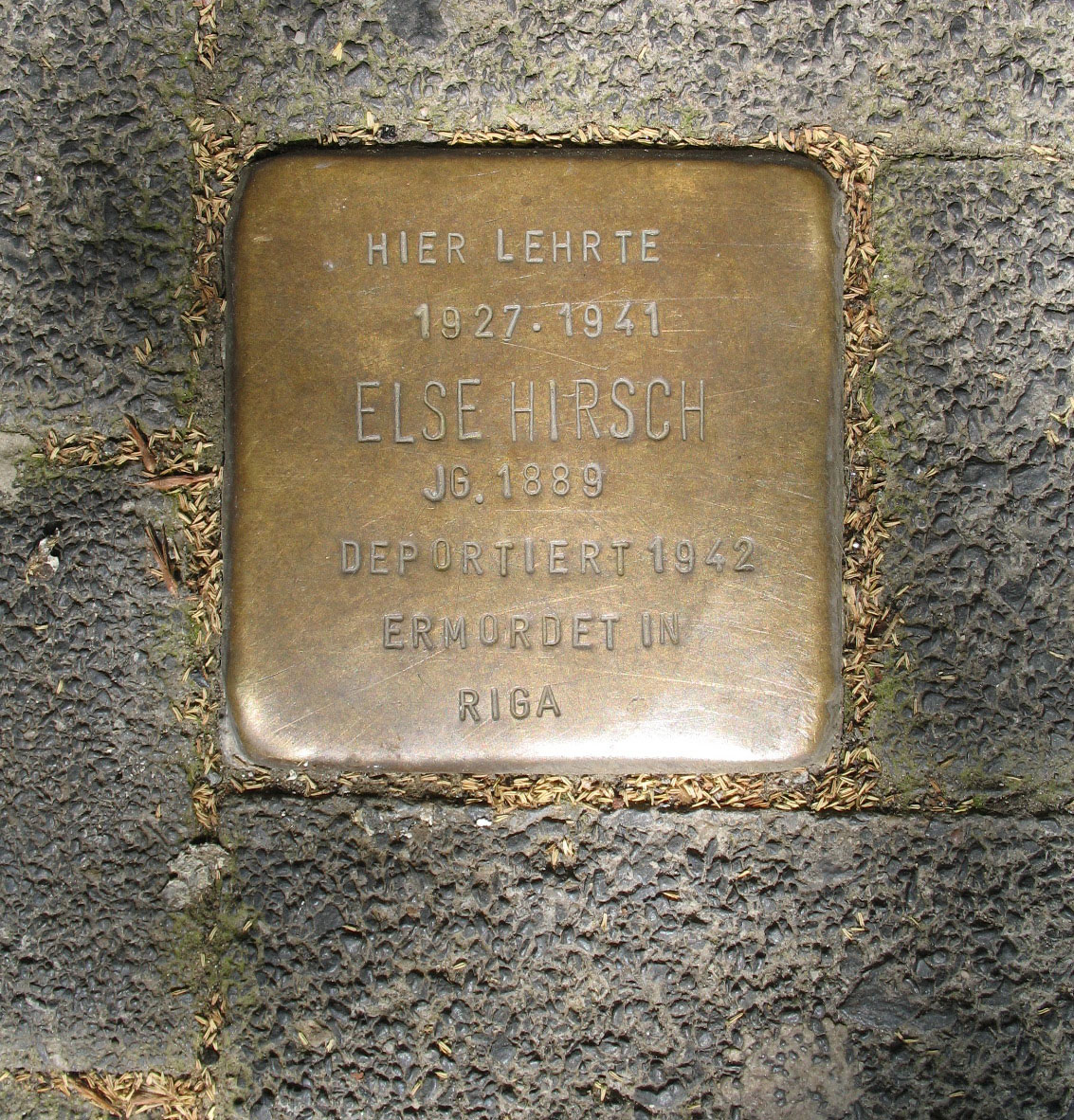
Commemorative plaque for Else Hirsch, 1889–1943

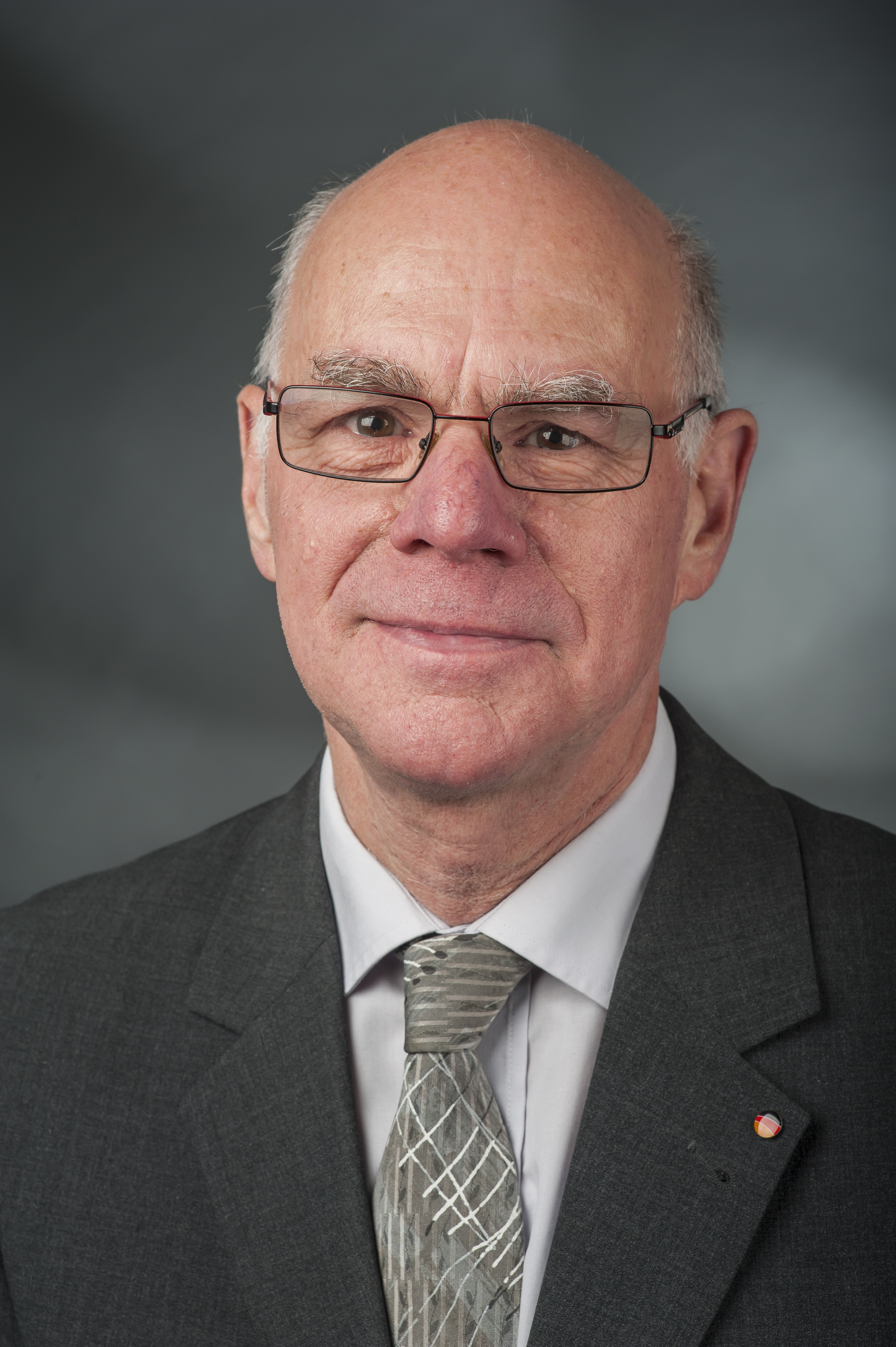
Norbert Lammert, 2014

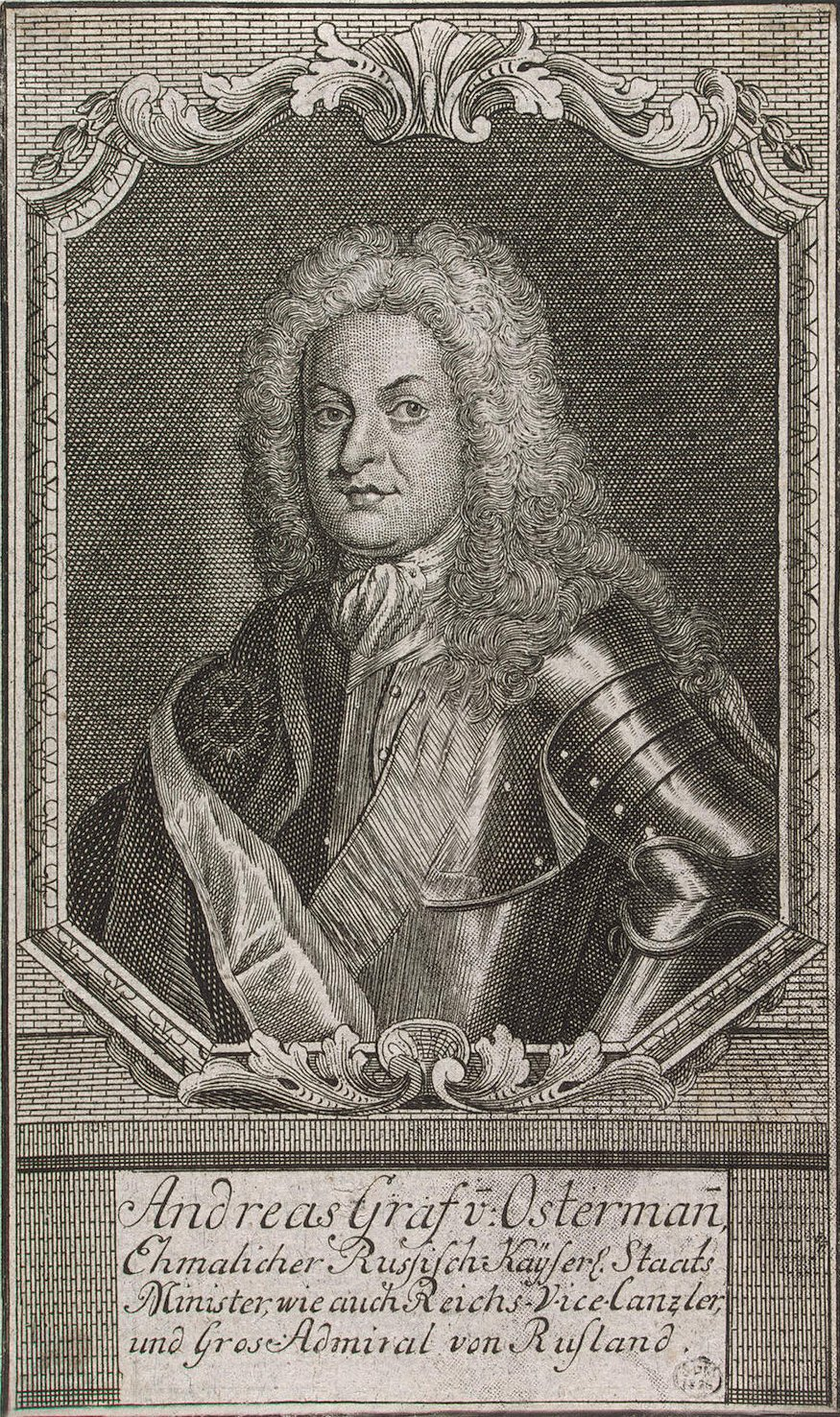
Andrey Osterman 1740–1741

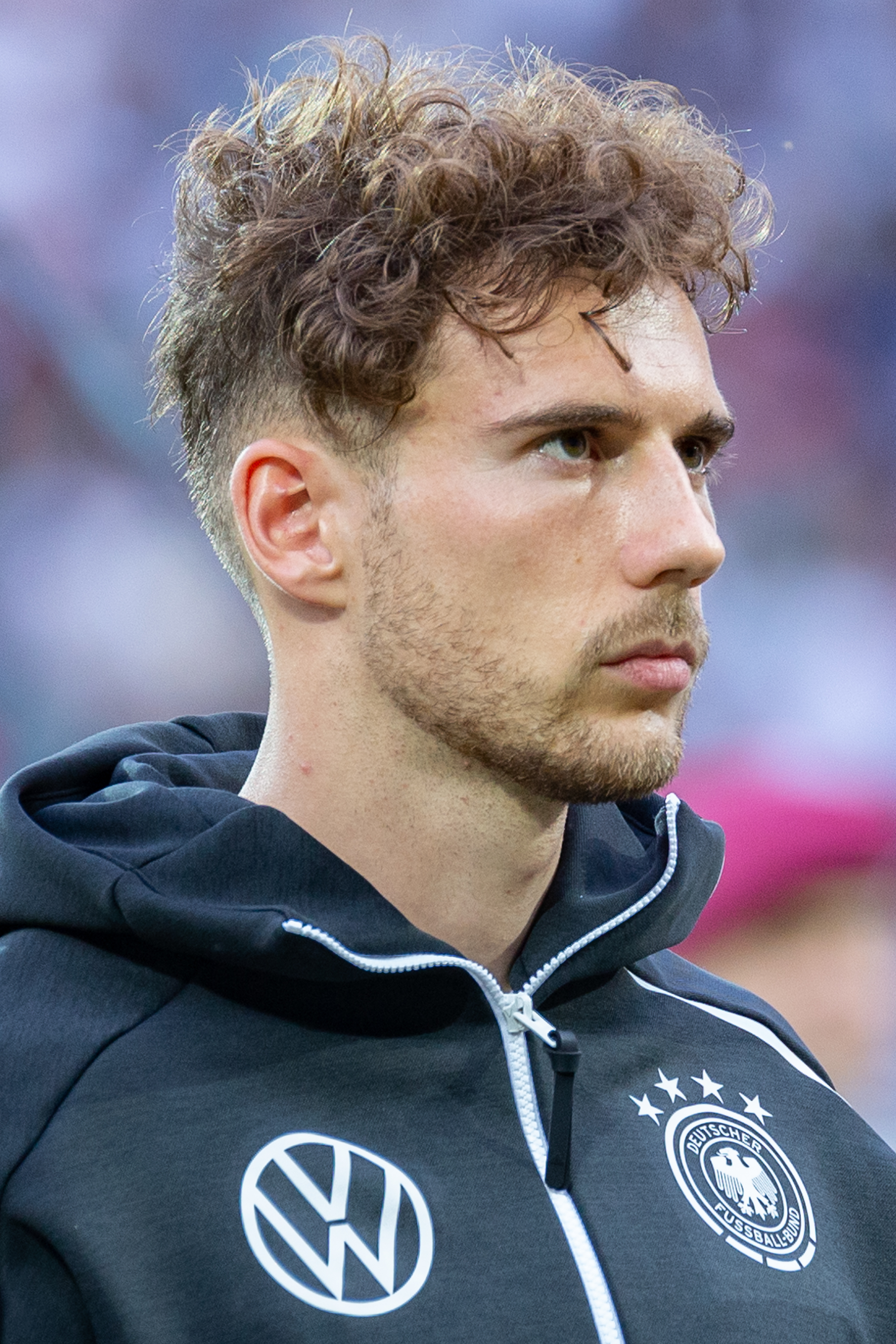
Leon Goretzka, 2019

- Lore Agnes (1876–1953), politician and women's rights activist
- Kurt Biedenkopf (1930–2021), politician (CDU), 1967–1969 Rector of the Ruhr University
- Jochen Borchert (born 1940), politician (CDU), 1993–1998 Federal Minister of Food, Agriculture and Forestry
- Willi Brokmeier (1928–2024), operatic tenor
- Elmar Budde (1935–2025), musicologist
- Wolfgang Clement (1940–2020), politician (SPD), Minister of Economy and Labour
- Hans Ehrenberg (1883–1958), theologian, Nazi critic, and co-founder of the Confessing Church
- Manfred Eigen (1927–2019), 1967 Nobel Prize winner in chemistry
- Tommy Finke (born 1981), songwriter and composer
- Josef Franke (1876–1944), architect
- Kuno Gonschior (1935–2010), painter and university professor
- Frank Goosen (born 1966), cabaret artist and author, wrote Learning to Lie
- Herbert Grönemeyer (born 1956), actor (Das Boot), singer, songwriter of the song "Bochum"
- Erna Herchenröder (1903–1977), politician (SPD)
- Claus Holm (1918–1996), actor, born in Bochum
- Else Hirsch (1889–1943), Jewish teacher who organised 10 Kindertransports to England and the Netherlands
- Max Imdahl (1925–1988), art historian
- Rolf Kanies (born 1957), actor, studied at Schauspielschule Bochum and performed at Schauspielhaus Bochum
- Heinz Kaminski (1921–2002), chemical engineer and space scientist
- Alfred Keller (1882–1974), general in the Luftwaffe during the Second World War
- Gershon Kingsley (1922–2019), Broadway musical director and composer, most notably of the electronic hit Popcorn
- Thomas Köner (born 1965), multimedia artist
- Carl Arnold Kortum (1745–1824), physician and writer
- Christine Lang (born 1957), German microbiologist
- Norbert Lammert (born 1948), politician (CDU), president (Speaker) of the Bundestag (German parliament)
- Karl-Heinz von Liebezeit (born 1960), actor, went to grammar and drama schools in Bochum
- Hans Matthöfer (1925–2009), politician (SPD)
- Ingo Naujoks (born 1962), actor
- Elisabeth Niggemeyer (1930–2025), photographer
- Hans Werner Olm (born 1955), comedian
- Andrei Osterman (1686–1747), Bochum-born Russian statesman.
- Bastian Pastewka (born 1972), actor and comedian
- Konrad Raiser (born 1938), former general secretary of the World Council of Churches, taught theology in Bochum
- Christian Redl (born 1948), actor, studied at Schauspielschule Bochum
- Armin Rohde (born 1955), actor
- Gerhard Charles Rump (born 1947), art historian and art dealer
- Otto Schily (born 1932), lawyer, politician (first The Greens, now SPD), former minister of the interior
- Hans-Jürgen Schlieker (1924–2004), painter
- Peter Scholl-Latour (1924–2014), German-French journalist and writer
- Paul Sethe (1901–1967), journalist
- Dirk Sondermann (born 1960), theologian and folklore expert
- André Tanneberger (born 1973), also known as "ATB", electronic music producer, began his career in Wattenscheid
- Jing Xiang (born 1993), actress at Schauspielhaus Bochum
- Werner Stengel (born 1936), rollercoaster designer and engineer

=== Sport ===
- Albert Bollmann (1889–1959), football player
- Hermann Gerland (born 1954), football player and coach
- Till Gloger (born 1993), basketball player
- Leon Goretzka (born 1995), football player, Olympic silver medalist
- Annegret Kroniger (1952–2025), sprinter, Olympic silver medalist (1976)
- Joël Matip (born 1991), German-born Cameroonian football player
- Tim Sandtler (born 1987), racing driver
- Dieter Versen (1945–2025), football player
- Mark Warnecke (born 1970), breaststroke swimmer, won the world title at the age of 35
- Lirim Zendeli (born 1999), racing driver

== See also ==
- VfL Bochum: personnel and celebrities
- Kruppwerke, part of the city of Bochum
- Südinnenstadt, part of the city of Bochum
