= Liebezeit =

Liebezeit is a surname of German origin. Notable people with the surname include:

- Jaki Liebezeit (1938–2017), German drummer, founding member of Can
- Karl-Heinz von Liebezeit (born 1960), German television actor
