= Outokumpu Nirosta =

German construction material company

Outokumpu Nirosta is a business segment of Outokumpu, headquartered in Krefeld, Germany. It produces flats of stainless steel. Prior to January 2012, it was named ThyssenKrupp Nirosta and part of ThyssenKrupp AG. The unit has a plant in Bochum.

The Nirosta brand was registered with the United States Patent and Trademark Office as early as 1920 for "NON-RUSTING STEELS, STAINLESS STEELS AND ACID RESISTING STEELS" etc. It is used in Germany to indicate stainless steel as a type of synonym. This usage is also common in Israel.

Nirosta is an acronym for nichtrostender Stahl ("non-rusting steel").
