= Dirk Sondermann =

German theologian (born 1960)

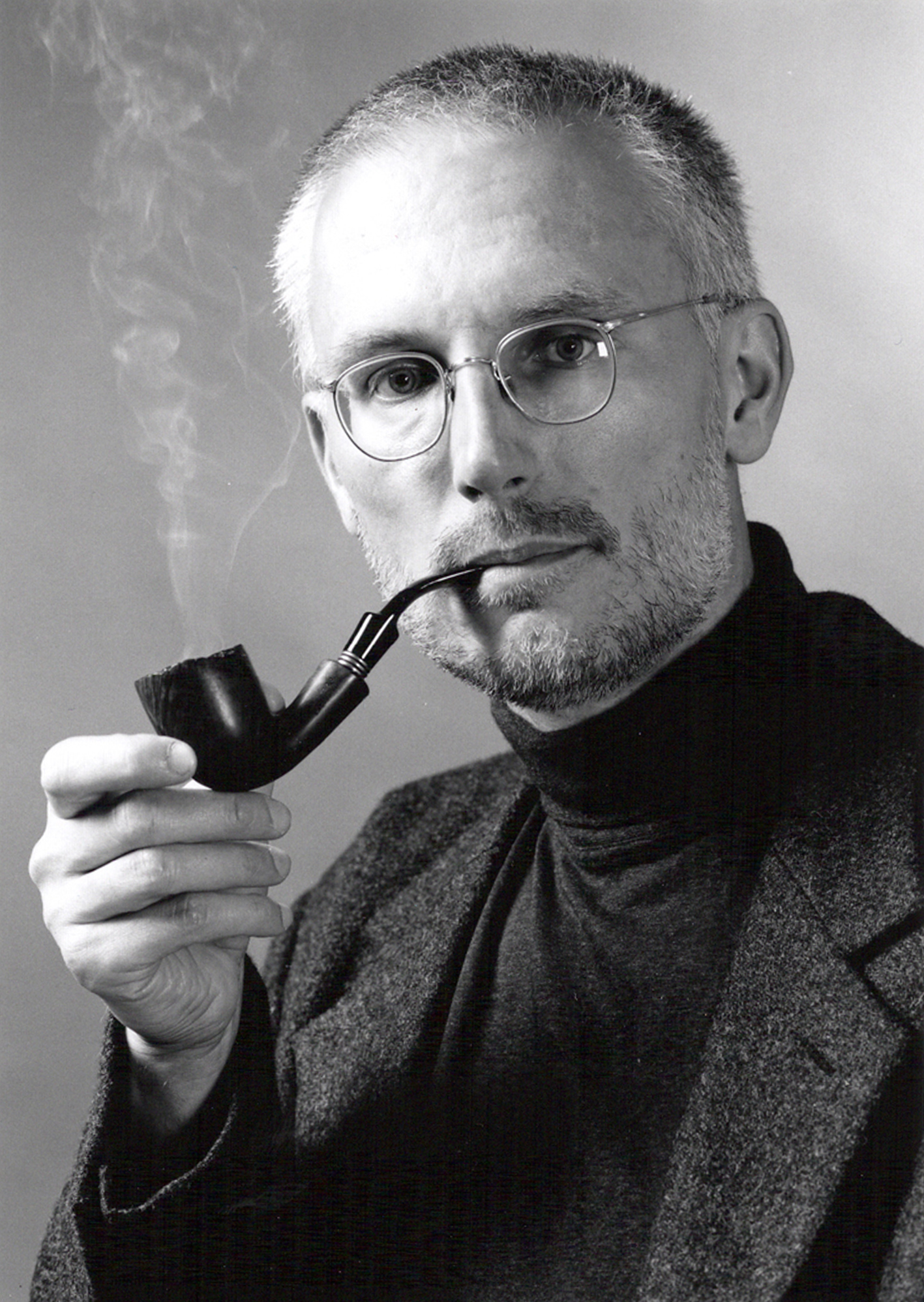
Sondermann

Dirk Sondermann (born 1960 in Bochum) is a German theologian and specialist for folklore expert. He is specialized into the regional legend world of North Rhine-Westphalia. In 2003 he founded the Institut für Erzählforschung im Ruhrgebiet. The institute is searching, discussing and locating the folkoristiks of the Ruhr Region.

Among Sondermann's favourite legends is the story of Goldemar on Hardenstein Castle. Sondermann cooperated with RUHR.2010 – Kulturhauptstadt Europas. He lives in Hattingen and is also running an enterprise for horticulture.

== Opus ==
Books

- Ruhrsagen. Von Ruhrort bis Ruhrkopf. Henselowsky Boschmann Verlag, Bottrop, 2. Auflage, September 2005, ISBN 3-922750-60-5
- Emschersagen. Von der Mündung bis zur Quelle. Bottrop: Henselowsky Boschmann Verlag, Bottrop, 2006. ISBN 3-922750-66-4
- Bochumer Sagenbuch. Peter Pomp, Essen, 4. Auflage Dezember 2004, ISBN 3-89355-067-4
- with Bernd Schmidt: Bochumer Sagenbuch. Hörbuch. Audio-CD. Peter Pomp, Essen, 2005. ISBN 3-89355-251-0
- Wattenscheider Sagenbuch. Peter Pomp, Essen, 2004, ISBN 3-89355-248-0
- Hattinger Sagenbuch. Peter Pomp, Essen, 2007, ISBN 978-3-89355-254-2

Articles

- König Goldemar, Haus Hardenstein und die Hardenberger im Spiegel der Sage. In: Hans Dieter Radke, Heinrich Schoppmeyer (Hrsg.): Burg Hardenstein. Geschichte und Geschichten. Witten, 1999, ISBN 3-00-004703-4, S. 161-199
