= Lottenbach =

River in Germany

Location
- Country: Germany
- States: North Rhine-Westphalia

Physical characteristics
- Mouth
  - location: Oelbach
  - coordinates: 51.4379°N 7.2814°E

Basin features
- Progression: Oelbach→ Ruhr→ Rhine→ North Sea

Lottenbach is a small river of North Rhine-Westphalia, Germany. It is 3.8 km long and flows into the Oelbach as a right tributary near Bochum.

== See also ==
- List of rivers of North Rhine-Westphalia
