= Südinnenstadt =

Südinnenstadt is a statistical area of the city of Bochum, located in the Ruhr urban agglomeration, Germany. Südinnenstadt lies to the south of the central business district. Südinnenstadt includes the Schauspielhaus, one of the most expensively funded theatres in the Ruhr area, and has one of the highest percentages of people living alone in the Ruhr area.
