= Hildegardis-Schule Bochum =

Coordinates: 51°29′10″N 7°13′42″E

Hildegardis-Schule
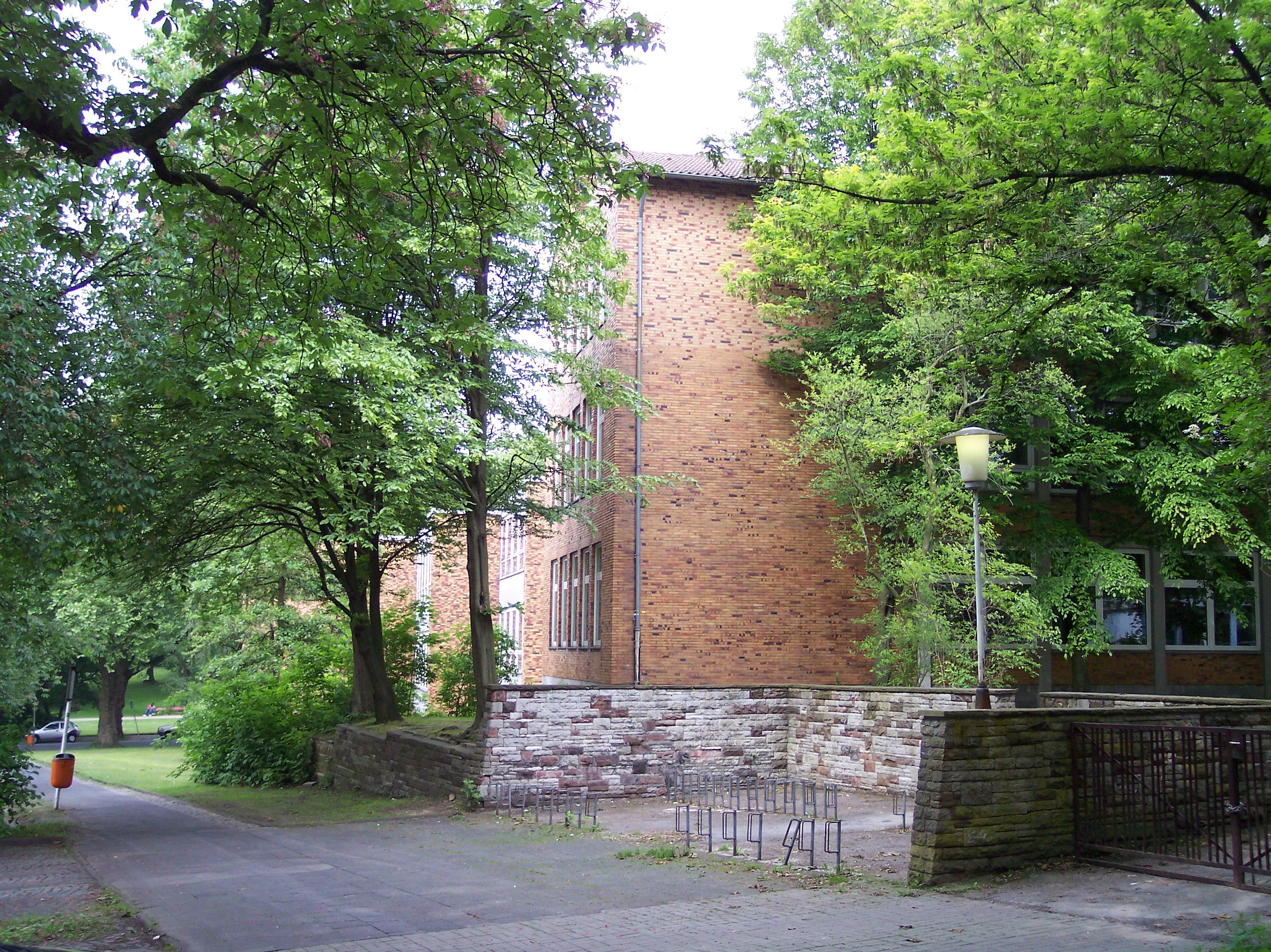

Location
- Klinikstrasse 1 Bochum, D-44791; Germany

Information
- School type: Gymnasium
- Opened: 1860
- Head of school: Werner Backhaus and Wolfgang Schmidt
- Teaching staff: 85
- Enrollment: 1150
- Language: German and French
- Website: www.hildegardis-bochum.de

The Hildegardis-Schule is a secondary school in the city of Bochum, Germany.

== History ==
The school was founded in 1860 by a young Bochum teacher, Henriette von Noël, as a private school for girls. An extension was built in 1901 and in 1916, the school was named after naturalist, theologian and author, Hildegard von Bingen. There is a statue of Hildegard von Bingen in front of the main entrance.

Today, the school is a public Gymnasium for boys and girls. The Hildegardis-Schule was one of the first schools in Germany to offer French bilingual education. History, politics and geography are taught in French and students may graduate with a French baccalaureat as well as an Abitur. In 2008, the school was certified as a "Europaschule" (de) (English: Europa School) by the Ministry of Schools of North Rhine-Westphalia. (Note: Not to be confused with the accredited status awarded by the international organisation, The European Schools.)

== Student exchange program ==
The Hildegardis-Schule has a student exchange program with schools in

- Wolverhampton in England
- Lyon, Duttlenheim, Châlons-en-Champagne, Châteauneuf-sur-Sarthe, Ile de la Réunion in France
- Vicenza in Italy
- Piekary Śląskie in Poland
- Be'er Sheva in Israel

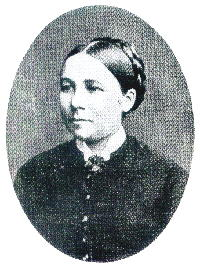
Henriette von Noël (1833–1903), teacher and school founder of Hildegardis-Schule
