= Hordel =

Coordinates: 51°29′52″N 7°10′26″E

Hordel is a borough of the city of Bochum, Germany in the Ruhr area in North Rhine-Westphalia. It is situated in the North West of Bochum. It borders to Röhlinghausen, which now is a borough of Herne.

The last mine of Bochum, Zeche Hannover was in Hordel. In Hordel there are several former mine railways.
