= Roeser Medical =

Roeser Medical Group
- Founded: 1918 in Essen, North Rhine-Westphalia, Germany
- Founder: Leonhard Hermann Josef Roeser
- Headquarters: Essen, Germany
- Number of employees: 340
- Website: www.roeser.de

Roeser Medical Group is a German trading and service company in the healthcare sector. The company is a leading German distributor of medical supplies to hospitals.

== History ==
Roeser Medical was founded by Leonhard Hermann Josef Roeser in Essen in 1918. Starting as a prosthesis manufacturer for World War I invalids, Roeser's sons Reiner and Leonhard expanded into the field of medical engineering. By 1969, the company supported about 30 hospitals in the Ruhr region.

From 1995, the company turned into a service provider focused on consulting, logistics and procurement services. In 1999, Roeser and two other companies, Westmed (Duisburg) and Lukas (Münster) merged into Roeser Medical GmbH Co. KG. In November 2004, MWB Medizintechnik (Bremen), was taken over. Further acquisitions include MWB Medizintechnik in November 2004 as well as EHS Medizintechnik and Klingenfuss in January 2012. In May 2017, German private hospital group Sana Kliniken AG announced to take over Roeser Medical from the Swedish private equity group EQT AB, who had owned Roeser since 2010.

The company moved its headquarters from Mülheim an der Ruhr to Bochum in 2009, where it took over the former Nokia halls. In 2015, it moved back to Essen.

== Products and services ==
Roeser offers planning and configuration of functional areas in hospitals and provides access to more than 800.000 products from more than 900 manufacturers. These include products by Welch Allyn, Covidien, and Becton Dickinson.
