= Albert Bollmann =

German footballer

Personal information
- Date of birth: 5 October 1889
- Place of birth: Langendreer, German Empire
- Date of death: 26 January 1959 (aged 69)
- Position: Midfielder

Youth career
- –1904: Schwarz-Weiß Essen

Senior career*
Years	Team	Apps	(Gls)
1904–1922	Schwarz-Weiß Essen		
1922–1928	TuS Bochum		

International career
1914	Germany	1	(0)
- * Club domestic league appearances and goals

Albert Bollmann (5 October 1889 – 26 January 1959) was a German international footballer.
