= Karl-Heinz von Liebezeit =

German television actor (born 1960)

Karl-Heinz von Liebezeit (born 10 July 1960 in Karlsruhe, West Germany) is a German television actor.

== Selected filmography ==
- Derrick - Season 9, Episode 6: "Das Alibi" (1982)
