= List of 20th-century religious leaders =

This is a list of the top-level leaders for religious groups with at least 50,000 adherents, and that led anytime from January 1, 1901, to December 31, 2000. It should likewise only name leaders listed on other articles and lists.

== Buddhism ==
- Jodo Shinshu (complete list) –
  - Hongwanji-ha
    - Myōnyo, Monshu (1871–1903)
    - Kyōnyo, Monshu (1903–1914)
    - Shōnyo, Monshu (1927–1977)
    - Sokunyo, Monshu (1977–2014)
  - Ōtani-ha
    - Gennyo, Monshu (1889–1908)
    - Shōnyo, Monshu (1908–1925)
    - Sennyo, Monshu (1925–1993)
    - Jōnyo, Monshu (1996–2020)
- Soka Gakkai –
  - Tsunesaburō Makiguchi, President (1930–1944)
  - Jōsei Toda, President (1951–1958)
  - Daisaku Ikeda, President (1960–1979)
  - Hiroshi Hōjō, President (1979–1981)
  - Einosuke Akiya, President (1981–2006)
- Thai Buddhism –
  - Vajirananavarorasa, Somdet and Supreme Patriarch (1910–1921)
  - Kromma Luang Jinavorn Sirivaddhana, Somdet and Supreme Patriarch (1921–1937)
  - Phae Tissadeva, Somdet Phra and Supreme Patriarch (1938–1944)
  - Momrajavong Chuen Noppavong, Somdet and Supreme Patriarch (1945–1958)
  - Plod Kittisobhana, Somdet Phra and Supreme Patriarch (1960–1962)
  - Yoo Nanodayo, Somdet Phra and Supreme Patriarch (1963–1966)
  - Chuan Utthayi, Somdet Phra and Supreme Patriarch (1965–1971)
  - Pun Punnasiri, Somdet Phra and Supreme Patriarch (1972–1973)
  - Ariyavangsagatayana, Somdet Phra and Supreme Patriarch (1973–1988)
  - Nyanasamvara Suvaddhana, Somdet Phra and Supreme Patriarch (1989–2013)

=== Tibetan Buddhism ===
- Dalai Lama of the Gelug (Yellow Hat sect) –
  - Thubten Gyatso, 13th Dalai Lama (1878–1933)
  - Tenzin Gyatso, 14th Dalai Lama (1937–present)
- Panchen Lama of the Gelug (Yellow Hat sect) –
  - Thubten Chökyi Nyima, Panchen Lama (1883–1937)
  - Lobsang Trinley Lhündrub Chökyi Gyaltsen, Panchen Lama (1938–1989)
  - Gedhun Choekyi Nyima, Panchen Lama (1989–present), post held in dispute
- Karmapa Lama (Kagyu sect) –
  - Khakyab Dorje, 15th Karmapa Lama (1870s–1922)
  - Rangjung Rigpe Dorje, 16th Karmapa Lama (1924–1981)
  - Trinley Thaye Dorje, 17th Karmapa Lama (1983–present)

Mongolia

- Jebtsundamba Khutuktu —
  - Bogd Khan (1870–1924)
  - Jambalnamdolchoyjijantsan (1991–2012)

Russia

- Buddhist Traditional Sangha of Russia —
  - Damba Ayusheev, XXIV Pandito Khambo Lama (1995–present)

== Christianity ==
=== Catholicism ===
==== Roman Catholicism ====
- Catholic Church (complete list) –
  - Leo XIII, Pope (1878–1903)
  - Pius X, Pope (1903–1914)
  - Benedict XV, Pope (1914–1922)
  - Pius XI, Pope (1922–1939)
  - Pius XII, Pope (1939–1958)
  - John XXIII, Pope (1958–1963)
  - Paul VI, Pope (1963–1978)
  - John Paul I, Pope (1978)
  - John Paul II, Pope (1978–2005)

==== Old Catholicism ====
- Church of Utrecht –
  - Gerardus Gul, Archbishop of Utrecht (1892–1920)
  - Franciscus Kenninck, Archbishop of Utrecht (1920–1937)
  - Andreas Rinkel, Archbishop of Utrecht (1937–1970)
  - Marinus Kok, Archbishop of Utrecht (1970–1981)
  - Antonius Jan Glazemaker, Archbishop of Utrecht (1982–2000)
  - Joris Vercammen, Archbishop of Utrecht (2000–2020)

==== Independent Catholicism ====
- Philippine Independent Church (Aglipayan Church) –
  - Gregorio Aglipay y Labayan, Supreme Bishop (1902–1940)
  - Santiago Fonacier, Supreme Bishop (1940–1946)
  - Gerardo Bayaca, Supreme Bishop (1946–1946)
  - Isabelo de los Reyes, Jr., Supreme Bishop (1946–1971)
  - Macario V. Ga, Supreme Bishop (1971–1981)
  - Abdias de la Cruz, Supreme Bishop (1981–1987)
  - Soliman Ganno, Supreme Bishop (1987–1989)
  - Tito Pasco, Supreme Bishop (1989–1993)
  - Alberto Ramento, Supreme Bishop (1993–1999)
  - Tomas Millamena, Supreme Bishop (1999–2005)
- Polish National Catholic Church of America –
  - Francis Hodur, Prime Bishop (1904–1953)
  - Leon Grochowski, Prime Bishop (1953–1969)
  - Thaddeus Zielinski, Prime Bishop (1969–1978)
  - Francis Rowinski, Prime Bishop (1978–1985)
  - John Swantek, Prime Bishop (1985–2002)
- Brazilian Catholic Apostolic Church –
  - Carlos Duarte Costa, Patriarch (1945–1961)
  - Luis Fernando Castillo Mendez, Patriarch (1961–2009)

=== Eastern Orthodoxy ===
==== Autocephalous Churches ====
- Ecumenical Patriarchate of Constantinople – (complete list), the first among equals in Eastern Orthodoxy
  - Constantine V, Ecumenical Patriarch of Constantinople (1897–1901)
  - Joachim III, Ecumenical Patriarch of Constantinople (1901–1912)
  - Germanus V, Ecumenical Patriarch of Constantinople (1913–1918)
  - Meletius IV, Ecumenical Patriarch of Constantinople (1921–1923)
  - Gregory VII, Ecumenical Patriarch of Constantinople (1923–1924)
  - Constantine VI, Ecumenical Patriarch of Constantinople (1924–1925)
  - Basil III, Ecumenical Patriarch of Constantinople (1925–1929)
  - Photius II, Ecumenical Patriarch of Constantinople (1929–1935)
  - Benjamin I, Ecumenical Patriarch of Constantinople (1936–1946)
  - Maximus V, Ecumenical Patriarch of Constantinople (1946–1948)
  - Athenagoras I, Ecumenical Patriarch of Constantinople (1948–1972)
  - Demetrius I, Ecumenical Patriarch of Constantinople (1972–1991)
  - Bartholomew I, Ecumenical Patriarch of Constantinople (1991–present)
- Albanian Orthodox Church –
  - Visarion (Xhuvani), Archbishop of Tirana and All Albania (1929–1937)
  - Kristofor (Kisi), Archbishop of Tirana and All Albania (1937–1948)
  - Pais (Vodica), Archbishop of Tirana and All Albania (1948–1952)
  - Damian (Kokoneshi), Archbishop of Tirana and All Albania (1952–1967)
  - vacant (1968–1991)
  - Anastasios (Yannoulatos), Archbishop of Tirana, Durrës and All Albania (1992–2025)
- Greek Orthodox Patriarchate of Alexandria (complete list) –
  - Photius, Patriarch of Alexandria (1900–1925)
  - Meletius II, Patriarch of Alexandria (1926–1935)
  - Nicholas V, Patriarch of Alexandria (1936–1939)
  - Christopher II, Patriarch of Alexandria (1939–1966)
  - vacant (1966–1968)
  - Nicholas VI, Patriarch of Alexandria (1968–1986)
  - Parthenius III, Patriarch of Alexandria (1987–1996)
  - Peter VII, Patriarch of Alexandria (1997–2004)
- Greek Orthodox Patriarchate of Antioch (complete list) –
  - Meletius II (Doumani), Patriarchs of Antioch (1899–1906)
  - Gregory IV (Haddad), Patriarch of Antioch (1906–1928)
  - Alexander III (Tahan), Patriarch of Antioch (1928–1958)
    - Arsenius II (Haddad), Patriarch of Antioch (schism, 1930–1931)
  - Theodosius VI (Abourjaily), Patriarch of Antioch (1958–1970)
  - Elias IV (Muawad), Patriarch of Antioch (1970–1979)
  - Ignatius IV (Hazim), Patriarch of Antioch (1979–2012)
- Bulgarian Orthodox Church (complete list) –
  - Joseph I of Bulgaria, Exarch, (1877–1915)
  - Parteniy of Sofia, Metropolitan (1915–1918)
  - Vasiliy of Dorostol-Cherven, Metropolitan (1918–1921)
  - Maxim of Plovdiv, Metropolitan (1921–1928)
  - Kliment of Vratsa, Metropolitan (1928–1930)
  - Neofit (Karaabov) of Vidin, Metropolitan (1930–1944)
  - Stefan (Shokov) of Bulgaria, Metropolitan (1944–1945)
  - Stefan I of Bulgaria, Exarch (1945–1948)
  - Mihail of Dorostol, Metropolitan (1948–1949)
  - Paisiy of Vratsa, Metropolitan (1949–1951)
  - Cyril of Bulgaria, Metropolitan (1951–1953)
  - Cyril of Bulgaria, Patriarch of All Bulgaria (1953–1971)
  - Maxim (Minkov) of Bulgaria, Patriarch of All Bulgaria (1971–2012)
- Cypriot Orthodox Church (complete list) –
  - Sophronios III, ArchbArchbishop of Nea Justiniana and All Cypru (1865–1909)
  - Kyrillos II, Archbishop of Nea Justiniana and All Cypru (1909–1916)
  - Kyrillos III, Archbishop of Nea Justiniana and All Cypru (1916–1947)
  - Leontios, Archbishop of Nea Justiniana and All Cypru (1947)
  - Makarios II, Archbishop (1947–1950)
  - Makarios III, Archbishop (1950–1977)
  - Chrysostomos I of Cyprus, Archbishop of Nea Justiniana and All Cyprus (1977–2006)
- Czech and Slovak Orthodox Church –
  - Gorazd (Pavlik) of Prague, Archbishop of Prague (1921–1942)
  - Jelevferij, Exarch of the Patriarchate of Moscow in Czechoslovakia (1946–1951) Metropolitan of All Czechoslovakia (1951–1955)
  - John (Kukhtin), Metropolitan of Prague and All Czechoslovakia (1956–1959)
  - Eleutherius (Vorontsov), Metropolitan of Prague and All Czechoslovakia (1959–1964)
  - Dorotheus (Filip) of Prague, Metropolitan of the Czech Lands and Slovakia (1964–1999)
  - Nicholas (Kocvár) of Prešov, Metropolitan of the Czech Lands and Slovakia (2000–2006)
- Georgian Orthodox Church –
  - Flavian (Gorodetsky), Exarch of Georgia (1898–1901)
  - Aleksey (Opotsky), Exarch of Georgia (1901–1905)
  - Nicholas (Nalimov), Exarch of Georgia (1905–1906)
  - Nikon (Sofiysky), Exarch of Georgia (1906–1908)
  - Innocent (Beliaev), Exarch of Georgia (1909–1913)
  - Aleksey (Molchanov), Exarch of Georgia (1913–1914)
  - Pitirim (Oknov), Exarch of Georgia (1914–1915)
  - Platon (Rozhdestvensky), Exarch of Georgia (1915–1917)
  - Kyrion II, Catholicos-Patriarch of All Georgia (1917–1918)
  - Leonid, Catholicos-Patriarch of All Georgia (1918–1921)
  - Ambrose, Catholicos-Patriarch of All Georgia (1921–1927)
  - Christophorus III, Catholicos-Patriarch of All Georgia (1927–1932)
  - Callistratus, Catholicos-Patriarch of All Georgia (1932–1952)
  - Melchizedek III, Catholicos-Patriarch of All Georgia (1952–1960)
  - Ephraim II, Catholicos-Patriarch of All Georgia (1960–1972)
  - David V, Catholicos-Patriarch of All Georgia (1972–1977)
  - Ilia II, Catholicos-Patriarch of All Georgia (1977–2026)
- Church of Greece (complete list) –
  - Procopius II of Athens, Archbishop of Athens and All Greece (1896–1901)
  - Theocletus I of Athens, Archbishop of Athens and All Greece (1902–1917 (1st))
  - Meletius III of Athens, Archbishop of Athens and All Greece (1918–1920)
  - Theocletus I of Athens, Archbishop of Athens and All Greece (1920–1922 (2nd))
  - Chrysostomos I of Athens, Archbishop of Athens and All Greece (1923–1938)
  - Chrysanthus of Athens, Archbishop of Athens and All Greece (1938–1941)
  - Damaskinos of Athens, Archbishop of Athens and All Greece (1941–1949)
  - Spyridon of Athens, Archbishop of Athens and All Greece (1949–1956)
  - Dorotheus of Athens, Archbishop of Athens and All Greece (1956–1957)
  - Theocletus II of Athens, Archbishop of Athens and All Greece (1957–1962)
  - Iakovos III of Athens, Archbishop of Athens and All Greece (1962)
  - Chrysostomos II of Athens, Archbishop of Athens and All Greece (1962–1967)
  - Ieronymos I of Athens, Archbishop of Athens and All Greece (1967–1973)
  - Seraphim of Athens, Archbishop of Athens and All Greece (1973–1998)
  - Christodoulos of Athens, Archbishop of Athens and All Greece (1998–2008)
- Greek Orthodox Patriarchate of Jerusalem –
  - Damian I, Patriarch of the Holy City of Jerusalem and All Palestine (1897–1931)
  - Timothy I, Patriarch of the Holy City of Jerusalem and All Palestine (1935–1955)
  - Benedict I of Jerusalem, Patriarch of the Holy City of Jerusalem and All Palestine (1957–1980)
  - Diodoros (Karivalis), Patriarch of the Holy City of Jerusalem and All Palestine (1981–2000)
  - Kornilios of Petra, Locum Tenens of the Greek Orthodox Church of Jerusalem (2000–2001)
- Orthodox Church in America, North America (complete list) –
  - Tikhon (Bellavin), Bishop of the Aleutians and Alaska (1898–1900)
  - Tikhon (Bellavin), Archbishop (until 1905 - bishop) of the Aleutians and North America (1900–1907)
  - Platon (Rozhdestvensky), Archbishop of the Aleutians and North America (1907–1914)
  - Platon (Rozhdestvensky), Metropolitan of All America and Canada (1922–1934)
  - Evdokim (Meschersky), Archbishop of the Aleutians and North America (1914–1918)
  - Alexander (Nemolovsky), Archbishop of the Aleutians and North America (1919–1922)
  - Theophilus (Pashkovsky), Archbishop of San Francisco, Metropolitan of All America and Canada (1934–1950)
  - Leontius (Turkevich), Archbishop of New York, Metropolitan of All America and Canada (1950–1965)
  - Irenaeus (Bekish), Archbishop of New York, Metropolitan of All America and Canada (1965–1977)
  - Theodosius (Lazor), Archbishop of New York, Metropolitan of All America and Canada (1977–1980), Archbishop of Washington, Metropolitan of All America and Canada (1981–2002)
- Polish Orthodox Church
  - Timothy (Szretter) of Bialystok-Gdansk (acting), Metropolitan of Warsaw (1947–1951, recognized by Moscow)
  - Sawa Hrycuniak, Metropolitan of Warsaw and All Poland (1998–present)
- Romanian Orthodox Church
  - Iosif, Metropolitan of Hungaro-Walachia and Primate of All Romania (1886–1893, 1896–1909)
  - Atanasie, Metropolitan of Hungaro-Walachia and Primate of All Romania (1909–1911)
  - Conon, Metropolitan of Hungaro-Walachia and Primate of All Romania (1912–1919)
  - Miron Cristea, Metropolitan of Hungaro-Walachia and Primate of All Romania (1919–1925)
  - Miron Cristea, Patriarch of All Romania (1925–1939)
  - Nicodim Munteanu, Patriarch of All Romania (1939–1948)
  - Iustinian Marina, Patriarch of All Romania (1948–1977)
  - Iustin Moisescu, Patriarch of All Romania (1977–1986)
  - Teoctist Arăpașu, Patriarch of All Romania (1986–2007)
- Russian Orthodox Church (complete list) –
  - Vladimir, Metropolitan of Moscow (1898–1912)
  - Macarius II, Metropolitan of Moscow (1912–1917)
  - Tikhon of Moscow, Patriarch of Moscow and all Russia (1917–1925)
  - Peter of Krutitsy, Patriarcal Locum Tenens (1925–1936)
  - Sergius (Stragorodsky), acting Patriarcal Locum Tenens (1925–1926)
  - Seraphim (Samoylovich), acting Patriarcal Locum Tenens (1926)
  - Sergius (Stragorodsky) acting Patriarcal Locum Tenens (1926–1936), Patriarcal Locum Tenens (1936–1943), Patriarch of Moscow and All Russia (1943–1944)
  - Alexius I, acting (1944–1945), Patriarch of Moscow and All Russia (1945–1970)
  - Pimen I, acting (1970–1971), Patriarch of Moscow and All Russia 1971–1990)
  - Philaret (Denisenko) of Kiev, Patriarcal Locum Tenens (1990)
  - Alexy II of Russia, Patriarch of Moscow and All Russia (1990–2008)

==== Autonomous Churches ====
- Russian Orthodox Church Outside of Russia –
  - Anthony (Khrapovitsky), Metropolitan (1921–1936)
  - Anastassy (Gribanovsky), Metropolitan (1936–1964)
  - Philaret (Voznesensky), Metropolitan (1964–1985)
  - Vitaly (Ustinov), Metropolitan (1986–2001)
- Serbian Orthodox Church –
  - Georgije II Branković, Archbishop of Karlovci and Patriarch of Serbs (1888–1907)
  - Lukijan Bogdanović, Archbishop of Karlovci and Patriarch of Serbs (1908–1913)
  - Mihailo Grujic, Karlovci and Patriarch of Serbs (1913–1914)
  - Miron Nikolić, Archbishop of Karlovci and Patriarch of Serbs (1914–1918)
  - Georgije III Letić, Archbishop of Karlovci and Patriarch of Serbs (1919–1920)
  - Dimitrije, Archbishop of Peć and Serbian Patriarch (1920–1930)
  - Varnava, Archbishop of Peć and Serbian Patriarch (1930–1937)
  - Gavrilo V, Archbishop of Peć and Serbian Patriarch (1938–1950)
  - Vikentije II, Archbishop of Peć and Serbian Patriarch (1950–1958)
  - German, Archbishop of Peć and Serbian Patriarch (1958–1990)
  - Pavle, Archbishop of Peć and Serbian Patriarch (1990–2009)
- Montenegrin Orthodox Church –
  - Mitrofan Ban, Metropolitan (1884–1920)
- Orthodox Church of Finland – (complete list)
  - Nicholas (Nalimov), Archbishop of Vyborg and All Finland (1899–1905)
  - Sergius (Stragorodsky) Archbishop of Vyborg and All Finland (1905–1917)
  - Seraphim (Lukyanov) Archbishop of Vyborg and All Finland (1921–1923)
  - Herman (Aav) Archbishop of Karelia and All Finland (1925–1960)
  - Paul (Olmari), Archbishop of Karelia and All Finland (1960–1987)
  - John Rinne, Archbishop of Karelia and All Finland (1987–2001)
- Orthodox Church of Estonia –
  - Stephanos of Tallinn, Metropolitan of Tallinn and All Estonia (1999–present)
- Orthodox Church of Latvia –
- Orthodox Church in Japan
  - Nicholas (Kasatkin), titular Bishop of Riga (1880–1906)
  - Nicholas (Kasatkin), Archbishop of All Japan (1906–1912)
  - Sergius (Tikhomirov), Metropolitan of All Japan (1912–1945)
  - Nicholas (Ono), bishop of Tokyo (1945–1946)
  - Benjamin (Basalyga), Metropolitan of All Japan (1946–1952)
  - Ireneus (Bekish), Metropolitan of All Japan (1952–1962)
  - Vladimir (Nagosky), Metropolitan of All Japan (1962–1972)
  - Theodosius (Nagashima), Metropolitan of All Japan (1972–1999)
  - Peter (Arihara), elected Metropolitan of All Japan (2000)
  - Daniel (Nushiro), Metropolitan of All Japan (2000–2023)
- Macedonian Orthodox Church – Ohrid Archbishopric
  - Firmilianos, Metropolitan of Skopje (1899–1903)
  - Sevastianos, Metropolitan of Skopje (1904–1905)
  - Vikentios, Metropolitan of Skopje (1905–1915)
  - Varnava Rosić, Metropolitan of Skopje (1920–1930)
  - Josif Cvijovic, Metropolitan of Skopje (1932–1957)
  - Dositej II Stojkovski, Archbishop of Ohrid and Macedonia and Metropolitan of Skopje (1958–1967) went schism
- Greek Orthodox Archdiocese of Australia
  - Christophoros, Metropolitan of Australia (1924–1926)
  - Ioakim, Metropolitan of Australia (1926–1926)
  - Christophoros, Metropolitan of Australia (1926–1928)
  - Theophylactos Papathanasopoulos, Metropolitan of Australia (1928–1931)
  - Timotheos, Metropolitan of Australia (1931–1947)
  - Theophylaktos, Metropolitan of Australia (1947–1958)
  - Athenagoras I of Thyatira and, Metropolitan of Australia (1958–1959)

==== Ukrainian Orthodoxy ====
- Ukrainian Orthodox Church – Kyiv Patriarchate –
  Mstyslav, Patriarch of Kiev (1992–1993)
  Volodymyr, Patriarch of Kiev (1993–1995)
  Filaret, Patriarch of Kiev (1995–2026)
- Ukrainian Orthodox Church (Moscow Patriarchate)
  - Volodymyr Sabodan, Metropolitan of Kiev (1992–2014)
- Ukrainian Autocephalous Orthodox Church
  - Mstyslav Skrypnyk, Patriarch (?–1993)
- Ukrainian Autocephalous Orthodox Church Canonical [sic]
  - Moses (Kulik), Metropolitan of Kiev (?–present)

==== Schismatic churches ====
- Croatian Orthodox Church
  - Germogen (Maximov), Metropolitan (1942–1945)
- Macedonian Orthodox Church
  - Dositej II, Archbishop of Ohrid (1967–1981)
  - Angelarij, Archbishop of Ohrid (1981–1986)
  - Gavril II, Archbishop of Ohrid (1986–1993)
  - Timotej of Australia, Archbishop of Ohrid (1993–1993)
  - Mihail of Povardarie, administrator
  - Mihail, (1993–1999)
  - Stefan (1999–present)
- Belarusian Autocephalous Orthodox Church –
  - Melchizedek, Metropolitan of Minsk and All Belorussia (1922–1931)
  - Vacant?, Metropolitan of Minsk and All Belorussia (1931–1942)
  - Panteleimon, Metropolitan of Minsk and All Belorussia (1942–1946)
- Ukrainian Autocephalous Orthodox Church –
  - Mstyslav, Patriarch (1990–1993)
  - Dimitri, Patriarch (1993–2000)
  - Igor, Patriarch (2000)
  - Mefody (acting), Patriarch (2000–present)
- Ukrainian Orthodox Church of the Kyivan Patriarchate –
  - Volodymyr, Patriarch (1993–1995)
  - Filaret, Patriarch (1995–2026)

=== Oriental Orthodoxy ===
- Armenian Apostolic Church –
  - Mkrtich, Catholicos of All Armenians (1892–1907)
  - Matevos II, Catholicos of All Armenians (1908–1910)
  - Gevorg V, Catholicos of All Armenians (1910–1930)
  - Khoren, Catholicos of All Armenians (1932–1938)
  - Gevorg VI, Catholicos of All Armenians (1945–1954)
  - Vazgen I, Catholicos of All Armenians (1955–1994)
  - Karekin I, Catholicos of All Armenians (1995–1999)
  - Karekin II, Catholicos of All Armenians (1999–present)
- Armenian Apostolic Church –
  - Grigor (acting), Catholicos of Cilicia (1895–1902)
  - Sahak II, Catholicos of Cilicia (1902–1939)
  - Eghishe, Catholicos of Cilicia (1940–1942)
  - Khad, Catholicos of Cilicia (1942–1945)
  - Karekin I, Catholicos of Cilicia (1943–1952)
  - Khad, Catholicos of Cilicia (1952–1955)
  - Zareh I, Catholicos of Cilicia (1956–1963)
  - Khoren I, Catholicos of Cilicia (1963–1983)
  - Karekin II, Catholicos of Cilicia (1983–1995)
  - Aram I, Catholicos of Cilicia (1995–present)
- Coptic Orthodox Church of Alexandria (complete list) –
  - Cyril V, Pope and Patriarch (1874–1927)
  - John XIX, Pope and Patriarch (1928–1942)
  - Macarius III, Pope and Patriarch (1942–1944)
  - vacant (1944–1946)
  - Joseph II, Pope and Patriarch (1946–1956)
  - vacant (1956–1959)
  - Cyril VI, Pope and Patriarch (1959–1971)
  - Shenouda III, Pope and Patriarch (1971–2012)
- Ethiopian Orthodox Church –
  - Mattheos, Metropolitan of Ethiopia (1889–1926)
  - Kyrillos, Metropolitan of Ethiopia (1927–1936)
  - Abraham, Metropolitan of Ethiopia (1936–1939)
  - Yohannis, Metropolitan of Ethiopia (1939–1945)
  - Kyrillos, Metropolitan of Ethiopia (1945–1950)
  - Basilios, Metropolitan of Ethiopia (1951–1959)
  - Basilios, Patriarch of Ethiopia (1959–1970)
  - Theophilos, Patriarch of Ethiopia (1971–1976)
  - Tekle Haimanot, Patriarch of Ethiopia (1976–1988)
  - Merkurios, Patriarch of Ethiopia (1988–1991)
  - Yacob, Patriarch of Ethiopia (1991–1992)
  - Abune Paulos, Patriarch of Ethiopia (1992–2012)
- Eritrean Orthodox Church –
  - Abune Phillipos, Patriarch of Eritrea (1998–2002)
- Malankara Orthodox Syrian Church –
  - Baselios Paulose I, Catholicose of the East (1912–1913)
  - vacant, Catholicose of the East (1913–1925)
  - Baselios Geevarghese I, Catholicose of the East (1925–1928)
  - Baselios Geevarghese II, Catholicose of the East (1929–1964)
  - Baselios Augen I, Catholicos of the East and Malankara Metropolitan (1964–1975)
  - Baselios Mar Thoma Mathews I, Catholicos of the East and Malankara Metropolitan (1975–1991)
  - Baselios Mar Thoma Mathews II, Catholicos of the East and Malankara Metropolitan (1991–2005)
- Syriac Orthodox Church –
  - Ignatius Abdul Masih II, Patriarch of Antioch and All the East (1895–1905)
  - Ignatius Abdallah II, Patriarch of Antioch and All the East (1906–1916)
  - Ignatius Elias III, Patriarch of Antioch and All the East (1917–1932)
  - Ignatius Afram I Barsoum, Patriarch of Antioch and All the East (1933–1957)
  - Ignatius Jacob III, Patriarch of Antioch and All the East (1957–1980)
  - Ignatius Zakka I Iwas, Patriarch of Antioch and All the East (1980–2014)

=== Protestantism ===
- National Association of Evangelicals
  - Harold Ockenga, President (1942–1944)
  - Leslie Roy Marston, President (1944–46)
  - Rutherford Decker, President (1946–48)
  - Stephen W. Paine, President (1948–50)
  - Frederick C. Fowler, President (1950–52)
  - Paul S. Rees, President (1952–54)
  - Henry H. Savage, President (1954–56)
  - Paul P. Petticord, President (1956–58)
  - Herbert S. Mekeel, President (1958–60)
  - Thomas F. Zimmerman, President (1960–62)
  - Robert A. Cook, President (1962–64)
  - Jared F. Gerig, President (1964–66)
  - Rufus Jones, President (1966–68)
  - Arnold Olson, President (1968–70)
  - Hudson T. Armerding, President (1970–72)
  - Myron F. Boyd, President (1972–74)
  - Paul E. Toms, President (1974–76)
  - Nathan Bailey, President (1976–78)
  - Carl H. Lundquist, President (1978–80)
  - J. Floyd Williams, President (1980–82)
  - Arthur Evans Gay, Jr., President (1982–84)
  - Robert W. McIntyre, President (1984–86)
  - Ray H. Hughes, President (1986–88)
  - John H. White, President (1988–90)
  - B. Edgar Johnson, President (1990–92)
  - Don Argue, President (1992–98)
  - Kevin Mannoia, President (1999–2001)

==== Anglicanism ====
===== Provinces of the Anglican Communion =====
- Church of England –

- Formal leadership: Supreme Governor of the Church of England (complete list) –

- Victoria, Supreme Governor (1837–1901)
- Edward VII, Supreme Governor (1901–1910)
- George V, Supreme Governor (1910–1936)
- Edward VIII, Supreme Governor (1936)
- George VI, Supreme Governor (1936–1952)
- Elizabeth II, Supreme Governor (1952–2022)

- Effective leadership: Archbishops of Canterbury (complete list) –

- Frederick Temple, Archbishop of Canterbury (1896–1902)
- Randall Thomas Davidson, Archbishop of Canterbury (1903–1928)
- Cosmo Gordon Lang, Archbishop of Canterbury (1928–1942)
- William Temple, Archbishop of Canterbury (1942–1944)
- Geoffrey Francis Fisher, Archbishop of Canterbury (1945–1961)
- Arthur Michael Ramsey, Archbishop of Canterbury (1961–1974)
- Donald Coggan, Archbishop of Canterbury (1974–1980)
- Robert Runcie, Archbishop of Canterbury (1980–1991)
- George Carey, Archbishop of Canterbury (1991–2002)

- Anglican Church of Australia (complete list)–

- Saumarez Smith, Primate (1890–1909)
- John Wright, Primate (1910–1933)
- Henry Le Fanu, Primate (1935–1946)
- Howard Mowll, Primate (1947–1958)
- Hugh Gough, Primate (1959–1966)
- Philip Strong, Primate (1966–1970)
- Frank Woods, Primate (1971–1977)
- Marcus Loane, Primate (1978–1982)
- John Grindrod, Primate (1982–1989)
- Keith Rayner, Primate (1990–1999)
- Peter Carnley, Primate (2000–2005)

- Anglican Church of Canada (complete list)–

- Robert Machray, Primate (1893–1904)
- William B. Bond, Primate (1904–1906)
- Arthur Sweatman, Primate (1907–1909)
- Samuel Pritchard Matheson, Primate (1909–1931)
- Clarendon Lamb Worrell, Primate (1931–1934)
- Derwyn Trevor Owen, Primate (1934–1947)
- George Frederick Kingston, Primate (1947–1950)
- Walter Foster Barfoot, Primate (1950–1959)
- Howard Clark, Primate (1959–1971)
- Ted Scott, Primate (1971–1986)
- Michael Peers, Primate (1986–2004)

- Hong Kong Sheng Kung Hui (complete list) –

- Peter Kwong, Archbishop (1998–2006)

- Episcopal Church (United States) –

- Presiding Bishop (complete list) –

- Thomas Clark, Presiding Bishop (1899–1903)
- Daniel Tuttle, Presiding Bishop (1903–1923)
- Alexander Garrett, Presiding Bishop (1923–1924)
- Ethelbert Talbot, Presiding Bishop (1924–1926)
- John Murray, Presiding Bishop (1926–1929)
- Charles Anderson, Presiding Bishop (1929–1930)
- DeWolf Perry, Presiding Bishop (1930–1937)
- Henry Tucker, Presiding Bishop (1938–1946)
- Henry Sherrill, Presiding Bishop (1947–1958)
- Arthur Lichtenberger, Presiding Bishop (1958–1964)
- John Hines, Presiding Bishop (1965–1974)
- John Allin, Presiding Bishop (1974–1985)
- Edmond Lee Browning, Presiding Bishop (1986–1997)
- Frank Griswold, Presiding Bishop (1998–2006)

- Presidents of the House of Deputies (complete list) –

- George Werner, President (2000–present)

===== Continuing Anglicanism =====
- American Anglican Church – John A. Herzog, Presiding Bishop (1994–present)
- Anglican Catholic Church
  - James Orin Mote, Metropolitan of the Original Province (1981-1983)
  - Louis Falk, Metropolitan of the Original Province (1983-1991)
- Anglican Episcopal Church – Reginald Hammond, Presiding Bishop (2000–2004)
- Anglican Province of America
  - Walter Grundorf, Presiding Bishop (early 1990s–2021)
- Church of England in South Africa –

- G. Frederick B. Morris, Presiding Bishop (1955–1965)
- Stephen Carlton Bradley, Presiding Bishop (1965–1984)
- Dudley Foord, Presiding Bishop (1986–1989)
- Joe J. Bell, Presiding Bishop (1989–2000)
- Frank J. Retief, Presiding Bishop (2000–2010)

- Diocese of the Great Lakes – Julius A. Neeser, Bishop Ordinary (1998–2002)
- Episcopal Missionary Church –

- A. Donald Davies, Presiding Bishop (1992–2000)
- William Millsaps, Presiding Bishop (2000–2005)

- Orthodox Anglican Communion –

- James Parker Dees, Metropolitan Archbishop (1963–1990)
- George C. Schneller, Metropolitan Archbishop (1991–1994)
- Robert J. Godfrey, Metropolitan Archbishop (1994–2000)
- Scott Earle McLaughlin, Metropolitan Archbishop (2000–present)

- Orthodox Anglican Church –

- James Parker Dees, Presiding Bishop (1963–1990)
- George C. Schneller, Presiding Bishop (1991–1994)
- Robert J. Godfrey, Presiding Bishop (1994–2000)
- Scott Earle McLaughlin, Presiding Bishop (2000–2012)

- Province of Christ the King – Robert Morse, Bishop Ordinary (1977–2007)
- Reformed Episcopal Church – Leonard W. Riches, Presiding Bishop (1996–2024)
- Traditional Anglican Communion – Louis Falk, Primate (1991–2002)

- Anglican Church in America – Louis Falk, Primate (1991–2005)
- Anglican Catholic Church in Australia – John Hepworth, Archbishop (1998–2012)
- Anglican Catholic Church of Canada – Robert Mercer, Bishop and Metropolitan (1988–2005)
- Anglican Church of India – Stephen Vattappara, Metropolitan Bishop (1990–present)

- United Episcopal Church of North America –

- John C. Gramley, Presiding Bishop (1992–1996)
- Stephen C. Reber, Presiding Bishop (1996–2010)

==== Baptist ====
International

- Baptist World Alliance –
  - John Clifford, President (1905–1911)
  - Robert Stuart MacArthur, President (1911–1923)
  - Edgar Young Mullins, President (1923–1928)
  - John MacNeill, President (1928–1934)
  - George Washington Truett, President (1934–1939)
  - James Henry Rushbrooke, President (1939–1947)
  - Charles Oscar Johnson, President (1947–1950)
  - Fred Townley Lord, President (1950–1955)
  - Theodore Floyd Adams, President (1955–1960)
  - Joao Filson Soren, President (1960–1965)
  - William R. Tolbert, Jr., President (1965–1970)
  - Carney Hargroves, President (1970–1975)
  - David Wong, President (1975–1980)
  - Duke Kimbrough McCall, President (1980–1985)
  - Noel Vose, President (1985–1990)
  - Knud Wumpleman, President (1990–1995)
  - Nilson Do Amaral Fanini, President (1995–2000)

- Billy Kim, President (2000–2005)

North America

- Baptist Joint Committee for Religious Liberty –

- J. Brent Walker, Executive Director (1999–present)

- Cooperative Baptist Fellowship –

- Daniel Vestal, Coordinator (1996–present)

- Full Gospel Baptist Church Fellowship –

- Paul S. Morton, International Presiding Bishop (1994–present)

- National Baptist Convention, USA, Inc. –

- Elias Camp Morris, President (1895–1922)
- L. K. Williams, President (1924–1940)
- David V. Jemison, President (1940–1953)
- Joseph H. Jackson, President (1954–1982)
- T. J. Jemison, President (1983–1994)
- Henry Lyons, President (1994–1999)
- Stewart Cleveland Cureton, President (1999)
- William J. Shaw, President (1999–2009)

- Southern Baptist Convention (complete list) –
  - W. A. Criswell, President (1968–1970)
  - Jimmy Allen, President (1977–1979)
  - Adrian Rogers, President (1st time, 1979–1980)
  - Bailey Smith, President (1980–1982)
  - James T. Draper, Jr., President (1982–1984)
  - Charles F. Stanley, President (1984–1986)
  - Adrian Rogers, President (2nd time, 1986–1988)
  - Jerry Vines, President (1988–1990)
  - Morris Chapman, President (1990–1992)
  - H. Edwin Young, President (1992–1994)
  - Jim Henry, President (1994–1996)
  - Tom Elliff, President (1996–1998)
  - Paige Patterson, President (1998–2000)
  - James Merritt, President (2000–2002)

==== Holiness ====
- Bible Missionary Church –
  - Rodger Moyer, General Moderator (1987–present)
  - Alvie Jarratt, General Moderator (1999–present)
- Christian and Missionary Alliance (U.S.) –
  - Albert Benjamin Simpson, Founder and President (1887–c.1919)
  - Paul Rader, President (1919–c.1920)
  - Frederick Senft, President (c.1920)
  - Harry M. Shuman, President (c.1920–c.1946)
  - Louis L. King, President (until c.1987)
  - David Rambo, President (c.1987–2005)
- Church of Christ (Holiness) U.S.A. –
  - Senior Bishop
    - Charles Price Jones, Senior Bishop, (1907–1949)
    - Major Rudd Conic, Senior Bishop, (1949–1992)
    - Maurice D. Bingham, Senior Bishop, (1996–2004)
  - President
    - Charles Price Jones, President, (1907–1949)
    - Major Rudd Conic, President, (1949–1992)
- Church of the Nazarene –
  - Phineas F. Bresee, General Superintendent (1907–1915)
  - Hiram F. Reynolds, General Superintendent (1907–1932)
  - Edgar Ellyson, General Superintendent (1908–1911)
  - Edward F. Walker, General Superintendent (1911–1918)
  - William C. Wilson, General Superintendent (1915)
  - John W. Goodwin, General Superintendent (1916–1940)
  - Roy T. Williams, General Superintendent (1916–1946)
  - J. B. Chapman, General Superintendent (1928–1947)
  - Joseph G. Morrison, General Superintendent (1936–1939)
  - Howard Miller, General Superintendent (1940–1948)
  - Orval J. Nease, General Superintendent (1940–1944, 1948–1950)
  - Hardy Powers, General Superintendent (1944–1968)
  - Gideon B. Williamson, General Superintendent (1946–1968)
  - Samuel Young, General Superintendent (1948–1972)
  - Daniel Vanderpool, General Superintendent (1949–1964)
  - Hugh C. Benner, General Superintendent (1952–1968)
  - V. H. Lewis, General Superintendent (1960–1985)
  - George Coulter, General Superintendent (1960–1985)
  - Edward Lawlor, General Superintendent (1968–1976)
  - Eugene Stowe, General Superintendent (1968–1993)
  - Orville Jenkins, General Superintendent (1968–1985)
  - Charles H. Strickland, General Superintendent (1972–1988)
  - William M. Greathouse, General Superintendent (1976–1989)
  - Jerald Johnson, General Superintendent (1980–1997)
  - Raymond Hurn, General Superintendent (1985–1993)
  - John A. Knight, General Superintendent (1985–2001)
  - Donald Owens, General Superintendent (1989–1997)
  - William J. Prince, General Superintendent (1989–2001)
  - James Diehl, General Superintendent (1993–2009)
  - Paul Cunningham, General Superintendent (1993–2009)
  - Jim Bond, General Superintendent (1997–2005)
  - Jerry D. Porter, General Superintendent (1997–present)
- Original Church of God or Sanctified Church
  - Charles W. Gray, National Bishop (1907–1945)
  - William Crosby, National Bishop (1945–1952)
  - T. R. Jeffries, National Bishop (1952–c.1959)
  - C. A. McLaurine, National Bishop (?–1966)
- Pillar of Fire International –
  - Alma Bridwell White, Founder and General Superintendent (1901–1946)
  - Arthur Kent White, General Superintendent (1946–1981)
  - Arlene Hart Lawrence, General Superintendent (1981–1984)
  - Donald Justin Wolfram, General Superintendent (1984–2000)
  - Robert Barney Dallenbach, General Superintendent (2000–2008)
- Salvation Army (complete list) –
  - William Booth, Founder and General (1865/1878–1912)
  - Bramwell Booth, General (1912–1929)
  - Edward Higgins, General (1929–1934)
  - Evangeline Booth (f), General (1934–1939)
  - George Carpenter, General (1939–1946)
  - Albert Orsborn, General (1946–1954)
  - Wilfred Kitching, General (1954–1963)
  - Frederick Coutts, General (1963–1969)
  - Erik Wickberg, General (1969–1974)
  - Clarence Wiseman, General (1974–1977)
  - Arnold Brown, General (1977–1981)
  - Jarl Wahlström, General (1981–1986)
  - Eva Burrows (f), General (1986–1993)
  - Bramwell Tillsley, General (1993–1994)
  - Paul Rader, General (1994–1999)
  - John Gowans, General (1999–2002)

==== Lutheran ====
- Lutheran World Federation –
  - Anders Nygren (Sweden), President (1947–1952)
  - Hanns Lilje (W. Germany), President (1952–1957)
  - Franklin Clark Fry (U.S.), President (1957–1963)
  - Fredrik A. Schiotz (U.S.), President (1963–1970)
  - Mikko E. Juva (Finland), President (1970–1977)
  - Josiah M. Kibira (Tanzania), President (1977–1984)
  - Zoltán Kaldy (Hungary), President (1984–1987)
  - Johannes Hanselmann (W. Germany), President (1987–1990)
  - Gottfried Brakemeier (Brazil), President (1990–1997)
  - Christian Krause (Germany), President (1997–2003)
- American Lutheran Church (1930) –
  - Carl Christian Hein, President (1930–19370)
  - Emmanuel F. Poppen, President (1937–1950)
  - Henry F. Schuh, President (1951–1960)
- American Lutheran Church –
  - Fredrik A. Schiotz, President (1960–1970)
  - Kent S. Knutson, Bishop (1970–1974)
  - David W. Preus, Bishop (1974–1988)
- Church of Sweden –
  - Johan August Ekman, Archbishop of Uppsala (1900–1913)
  - Nathan Söderblom, Archbishop of Uppsala (1914–1931)
  - Erling Eidem, Archbishop of Uppsala (1931–1950)
  - Yngve Brilioth, Archbishop of Uppsala (1950–1958)
  - Gunnar Hultgren, Archbishop of Uppsala (1958–1967)
  - Ruben Josefson, Archbishop of Uppsala (1967–1972)
  - Olof Sundby, Archbishop of Uppsala (1972–1983)
  - Bertil Werkström, Archbishop of Uppsala (1983–1993)
  - Gunnar Weman, Archbishop of Uppsala (1993–1997)
  - Karl Gustav Hammar, Archbishop of Uppsala (1997–2006)
- Evangelical Lutheran Joint Synod of Ohio –
  - Carl Christian Hein, President (1924–1930)
- Evangelical Lutheran Church (United States) –
  - Hans Gerhard Stub, President (1917–1925)
  - Johan Arnd Aasgaard, President (1925–1954)
  - Fredrik A. Schiotz, President (1954–1960)
- Evangelical Lutheran Church in America –
  - Herbert W. Chilstrom, Presiding Bishop (1988–1995)
  - H. George Anderson, Presiding Bishop (1995–2001)
- Evangelical Lutheran Church in Canada –
  - Telmor Sartison, National Bishop (1993–2001)
- Evangelical Lutheran Church of Estonia –
  - Jaan Kiivit, Jr (1994–2005)
- Evangelical Lutheran Church of Finland –
  - Gustaf Johansson, Archbishop of Turku (1899–1930)
  - Lauri Ingman, Archbishop of Turku (1930–1934)
  - Erkki Kaila, Archbishop of Turku (1935–1944)
  - Aleksi Lehtonen, Archbishop of Turku (1945–1951)
  - Ilmari Salomies, Archbishop of Turku (1951–1964)
  - Martti Simojoki, Archbishop of Turku (1964–1978)
  - Mikko E. Juva, Archbishop of Turku (1978–1982)
  - John Vikström, Archbishop of Turku (1982–1998)
  - Jukka Paarma, Archbishop of Turku (1999–2010)
- Lutheran Church–Missouri Synod –
  - Franz August Otto Pieper, President (1899–1911)
  - Friedrich Pfotenhauer, President (1911–1935)
  - John William Behnken, President (1935–1962)
  - Oliver Raymond Harms, President (1962–1969)
  - Jacob Aall Ottesen Preus II, President (1969–1981)
  - Ralph Arthur Bohlmann, President (1981–1992)
  - Alvin L. Barry, President (1992–2001)
- Lutheran Church in America –
  - Franklin Clark Fry, President (1962–1968)
  - Robert J. Marshall, President (1968–1978)
  - James R. Crumley, President (1978–1980)
  - James R. Crumley, Bishop (1980–1988)
- Synod of the Norwegian Evangelical Lutheran Church in America –
  - Ulrik Vilhelm Koren, President (1894–1910)
  - Hans Gerhard Stub, President (1910–1917)
- United Evangelical Lutheran Church –
  - G. B. Christiansen, President (1896–1921)
  - M. N. Andreasen, President (1921–1925)
  - N. C. Carlsen, President (1925–1950)
  - Hans C. Jersild, President (1950–1956)
  - William Larsen, President (1956–1960)
- United Lutheran Church in America –
  - Frederick H. Knubel, President (1918–1944)
  - Franklin Clark Fry, President (1944–1961)
- United Norwegian Lutheran Church of America –
  - Gjermund Hoyme, President (1890–1902)
  - Theodor H. Dahl, President (1902–1917)
- Wisconsin Evangelical Lutheran Synod –
  - Phillip von Rohr, President (1887–1908)
  - Gustav Ernst Bergemann, President (1908–1933)
  - John Brenner, President (1933–1953)
  - Oscar J. Naumann, President (1953–1979)
  - Carl H. Mischke, President (1979–1993)
  - Karl R. Gurgel, President (1993–2007)

==== Pentecostal ====
- World Assemblies of God Fellowship –
  - J. Philip Hogan, Chairman (1988–1992)
  - David Yonggi Cho, Chairman (1992–2000)
  - Thomas E. Trask, Chairman (2000–2008)
- Assemblies of God, United States –
  - Eudorus N. Bell, General superintendent (1914, 1920–23)
  - John W. Welch, General superintendent (1914–1919, 1923)
  - William T. Gaston, General superintendent (1924–1929)
  - Ernest S. Williams, General superintendent (1929–1949)
  - Wesley R. Steelberg, General superintendent (1949–1952)
  - Gayle F. Lewis, General superintendent (1952–1953)
  - Ralph M Riggs, General superintendent (1953–1959)
  - Thomas F. Zimmerman, General superintendent (1959–1985)
  - G. Raymond Carlson, General superintendent (1986–1993)
  - Thomas E. Trask, General superintendent (1993–2007)
- Grace Communion International (until 2009, called the Worldwide Church of God from 1968–2009) –
  - Herbert W. Armstrong, President and pastor general (1933–1986)
  - Joseph W. Tkach, President and pastor general (1986–1995)
  - Joseph Tkach, Jr., President and pastor general (1995–present)
- New Apostolic Church –
  - Fritz Krebs, Chief apostle (1895–1905)
  - Hermann Niehaus, Chief apostle (1905–1930)
  - Johann Gottfried Bischoff, Chief apostle (1930–1960)
  - Walter Schmidt, Chief apostle (1960–1975)
  - Ernst Streckeisen, Chief apostle (1975–1978)
  - Hans Urwyler, Chief apostle (1978–1988)
  - Richard Fehr, Chief apostle (1988–2005)

==== Methodism ====
- African Methodist Episcopal Church –
  - Clement W. Fugh, General Secretary (2000–present)
- Free Methodist Church in Canada –
  - Stan Toler, Bishop (1974–1993)
  - Gary R. Walsh, Bishop (1993–1997)
  - Keith A. Elford, Bishop (1997–present)
- Iglesia Evangelica Metodista en las Islas Filipinas –
  - Nicolas V. Zamora, General Superintendent (1909–1914)
  - Alejandro H. Reyes, General Superintendent (1914–1922)
  - Victoriano Mariano, General Superintendent (1922–1928)
  - Francisco Gregorio, General Superintendent (1928–1939)
  - Matias B. Valdez, General Superintendent (1939–1948)
  - Eusebio Tech, General Superintendent (1948–1952)
  - Marcelino C. Gutierrez, General Superintendent (1952–1953)
  - Lazaro G. Trinidad, General Superintendent (1953–1972)
  - Geronimo P. Maducdoc, General Superintendent (1972–1980)
  - George F. Castro, General Superintendent (1980–2000)
  - Nathaniel P. Lazaro, General Superintendent (2000–present)
- Methodist Church Ghana –
  - Francis C.F. Grant, President (1961–1966)
  - T. Wallace Koomson, President (1966–1973)
  - Charles K. Yamoah, President (1973–1977)
  - C. Awotwi Pratt, President (1977–1979)
  - Samuel B. Essamuah, President (1979–1984)
  - C. Awotwi Pratt, President (1984–1985)
  - Jacob S.A. Stephens, President (1985–1990)
  - Kwesi A. Dickson, President (1990–1997)
  - Samuel Asante Antwi, President and Presiding Bishop (1997–2003)
- Methodist Church in Singapore –
  - Methodist work in Southern and Southeast Asia
  - James M. Thoburn, Bishop and Superintendent (1888–1904)
  - William F. Oldham, Bishop and Superintendent (1904–1912)
  - John E. Robinson, Bishop and Superintendent (1912–1914)
  - William P. Eveland, Bishop and Superintendent (1914–1916)
  - John E. Robinson and J. W. Robinson, Bishops and Superintendents (1916–1920)
  - George H. Bickley, Bishop and Superintendent (1920–1924)
  - Titus Lowe, Bishop and Superintendent (1924–1928)
  - Edwin F. Lee, Bishop and Superintendent (1928–1948)
  - Southeastern Asia Central Conference
  - Raymond L. Archer, Bishop (1950–1956)
  - Hobart B. Amstutz, Bishop (1956–1964)
  - Robert F. Lundy, Bishop (1964–1968)
  - Methodist Church in Malaysia and Singapore
  - Yap Kim Hao, Bishop (1968–1973)
  - Theodore R. Doraisamy, Bishop (1973–1976)
  - Methodist Church in Singapore
  - Kao Jih Chung, Bishop (1976–1984)
  - Ho Chee Sin, Bishop (1984–1996)
  - Wong Kiam Thau, Bishop (1996–2000)
  - Robert M. Solomon, Bishop (2000–present)
- Methodist Church of South Africa
  - President
  - William B Rayner, President (1900–1901)
  - Alfred T Rhodes, President (1901–1902)
  - Robert Lamplough, President (1902–1903)
  - Nendrick Abrahams, President (1903–1904)
  - Ezra Nuttal, President (1904–1905)
  - Arthur P Chaplin, President (1905–1906)
  - Richard F Hornabrook, President (1906–1907)
  - William J Hacker, President (1907–1908)
  - George Weaver, President (1908–1909)
  - Wesley Hurt, President (1909–1911)
  - Joseph Metcalf, President (1911–1912)
  - Albert H Hodges, President (1912–1913)
  - William Pescod, President (1913–1914)
  - T Edward Marsh, President (1914–1915)
  - Robert Matterson, President (1915–1916)
  - Griffith W Rogers, President (1916–1917)
  - Henry Cotton, President (1917–1918)
  - Samuel Clark, President (1918–1919)
  - James PendlReebury, President (1919–1920)
  - George Robson, President (1920–1921)
  - Arthur J Lennard, President (1921–1922)
  - Charles S Lucas, President (1922–1923)
  - John W Househam, President (1923–1924)
  - John W Watkinson, President (1924–1925)
  - Frederick Holmes, President (1925–1926)
  - Andrew Graham, President (1926–1927)
  - Theo R Curnick BD, President (1927–1928)
  - William Flint DD, President (1928–1929)
  - Geo H P Jacques, President (1929–1930)
  - Allen Lea, President (1930–1931)
  - Ernest Titcomb, President (1931–1932)
  - John A Allcock, President (1932–1933)
  - William Meara, President (1933–1934)
  - Henry W Goodwin, President (1934–1935)
  - Thomas Stanton, President (1935–1936)
  - A Arthur Wellington, President (1936–1937)
  - William Meara, President (1937–1938)
  - Edwin Bottrill, President (1938–1939)
  - Lorenzo S H Wilkinson, President (1939–1940)
  - William Eveleigh, President (1940–1941)
  - William B Allcock, President (1941–1942)
  - Arnold Nichols, President (1942–1943)
  - William W Shilling, President (1943–1944)
  - William Whalley, President (1944–1945)
  - William Meara, President (1945–1946)
  - Cecil C Harris, President (1946–1947)
  - E Lyn Cragg, President (1947–1948)
  - Edward W Grant, President (1948–1949)
  - Joseph B Webb, President (1949–1950)
  - Stanley Le Grove-Smith, President (1950–1951)
  - Alison E F Garrett, President (1951–1952)
  - J Wesley Hunt, President (1952–1953)
  - Herbert W Rist, President (1953–1954)
  - Joseph B Webb, President (1954–1955)
  - Stanley B Sudbury, President (1955–1956)
  - William Illsley, President (1956–1957)
  - Clifford K Storey, President (1957–1958)
  - C Edgar Wilkinson, President (1958–1959)
  - Leslie A Hewson, President (1959–1960)
  - Frank H Edmonds, President (1960–1961)
  - Joseph B Webb, President (1961–1962)
  - Deryck P Dugmore, President (1962–1963)
  - Stanley G Pitts, President (1963–1964)
  - Seth M Mokitimi, President (1964–1965)
  - Wilfred W Hartley, President (1965–1966)
  - Robert C Bellis, President (1966–1967)
  - L G S Griffiths, President (1967–1968)
  - Cyril Wilkins, President (1968–1969)
  - Derrick W Timm, President (1969–1970)
  - C Edgar Wilkinson, President (1970–1971)
  - Alex L Boraine, President (1971–1972)
  - Stanley G Pitts, President (1972–1973)
  - Jotham C Mvusi, President (1973–1974)
  - Vivian W Harris, President (1974–1975)
  - Abel E Hendricks, President (1975–1976)
  - Charles R Stephenson, President (1976–1977)
  - Abel E Hendricks, President (1977–1978)
  - Donald C Veysie, President (1978–1979)
  - Andrew M Losaba, President (1979–1980)
  - Howard F Kirby, President (1980–1981)
  - T Simon N Gqubule, President (1981–1982)
  - Khoza E M Mgojo, President (1982–1983)
  - Fremont C Louw, President (1983–1984)
  - Peter J Storey, President (1984–1985)
  - Ernest N Baartman, President (1985–1986)
  - John P Scholtz, President (1986–1987)
  - Khoza E M Mgojo, President (1987–1988)
  - Stanley Mogoba, President (1988–1998)
  - H Mvume Dandala, President (1998–2002)
  - Ivan M Abrahams, President (2003-2011)
  - Ziphozihle D Siwa, President(2012-2018)
  - Purity N Malinga, President (2019-2023)
  - Pumla Nzimande, President (2024-date)
  - General Secretary
    - Alfred T Rhodes, General Secretary (1899–1901)
    - Ezra Nuttal, General Secretary (1901–1904)
    - Arthur P Chaplin, General Secretary (1904–1905)
    - Charles Pettman, General Secretary (1905–1911)
    - Henry Cotton, General Secretary (1911–1917)
    - James Robb, General Secretary (1917–1920)
    - John W Househam, General Secretary (1920–1923)
    - William H P Clulow, General Secretary (1923–1926)
    - Alfred A Stile, General Secretary (1926–1927)
    - William H P Clulow, General Secretary (1927–1928)
    - Thomas Stanton, General Secretary (1928–1934)
    - Arthur C File, General Secretary (1934–1938)
    - William H Irving, General Secretary (1938–1939)
    - Arthur C File, General Secretary (1939–1940)
    - William H Irving, General Secretary (1940–1942)
    - Edward W Grant, General Secretary (1942–1943)
    - F J Rhead Marsh, General Secretary (1943–1945)
    - Alison E F Garrett, General Secretary (1945–1951)
    - Stanley B Sudbury, General Secretary (1951–1953)
    - Frank H Edmonds, General Secretary (1953–1960)
    - Lloyd G Griffiths, General Secretary (1960–1961)
    - Alison E F Grant, General Secretary (1961–1962)
    - Stanley B Sudbury, General Secretary (1962–1973)
    - Cyril Wilkins, General Secretary (1973–1982)
    - M Stanley Mogoba, General Secretary (1982–1988)
    - Vivian Harris, General Secretary (1988–2001)

==== Other Protestant ====
- Seventh-day Adventists (complete list) –
  - George A. Irwin, General Conference President (1897–1901)
  - Arthur G. Daniells, General Conference President (1901–1922)
  - William A. Spicer, General Conference President (1922–1930)
  - Charles H. Watson, General Conference President (1930–1936)
  - J. Lamar McElhany, General Conference President (1936–1950)
  - William H. Branson, General Conference President (1950–1954)
  - Reuben R. Figuhr, General Conference President (1954–1966)
  - Robert H. Pierson, General Conference President (1966–1979)
  - Neal C. Wilson, General Conference President (1979–1990)
  - Robert S. Folkenberg, General Conference President (1990–1999)
  - Jan Paulsen, General Conference President (1999–2010)
- Uniting Church in Australia –
  - President
    - Davis McCaughey, President (1977–1979)
    - Winston O'Reilly, President (1979–1982)
    - Rollie Busch, President (1982–1985)
    - Ian Tanner, President (1985–1988)
    - Ronald Wilson, President (1988–1991)
    - H. D'Arcy Wood, President (1991–1994)
    - Jill Tabart, President (1994–1997)
    - John Mavor, President (1997–2000)
    - James Haire, President (2000–2003)
  - General Secretary
    - Winston O'Reilly, General Secretary (1977–1979)
    - David Gill, General Secretary (1980–1988)
    - Gregor Henderson, General Secretary (1989–2001)
- United Church of Canada –
  - George C. Pidgeon, Moderator (1925–1926)
  - James Endicott, Moderator (1926–1928)
  - William T. Gunn, Moderator (1928–1930)
  - Edmund H. Oliver, Moderator (1930–1932)
  - T. Albert Moore, Moderator (1932–1934)
  - Richard Roberts, Moderator (1934–1936)
  - Peter Bryce, Moderator (1936–1938)
  - John W. Woodside, Moderator (1938–1940)
  - Aubrey S. Tuttle, Moderator (1940–1942)
  - John R.P. Sclater, Moderator (1942–1944)
  - Jesse H. Arnup, Moderator (1944–1946)
  - Thomas W. Jones, Moderator (1946–1948)
  - Willard E. Brewing, Moderator (1948–1950)
  - Clarence M. Nicholson, Moderator (1950–1952)
  - Alexander A. Scott, Moderator (1952–1954)
  - George Dorey, Moderator (1954–1956)
  - James S. Thomson, Moderator (1956–1958)
  - Angus J. MacQueen, Moderator (1958–1960)
  - Hugh A. McLeod, Moderator (1960–1962)
  - James R. Mutchmor, Moderator (1962–1964)
  - Ernest M. Howse, Moderator (1964–1968)
  - Wilfred C. Lockhart, Moderator (1966–1968)
  - Robert Baird McClure, Moderator (1968–1971)
  - Arthur B. B. Moore, Moderator (1971–1972)
  - Bruce McLeod, Moderator (1972–1974)
  - Wilbur K. Howard, Moderator (1974–1977)
  - George M. Tuttle, Moderator (1977–1980)
  - Lois M. Wilson, Moderator (1980–1982)
  - W. Clarke MacDonald, Moderator (1982–1984)
  - Robert F. Smith, Moderator (1984–1986)
  - Anne M. Squire, Moderator (1986–1988)
  - Sang Chul Lee, Moderator (1988–1990)
  - Walter H. Farquharson, Moderator (1990–1992)
  - Stan McKay, Moderator (1992–1994)
  - Marion Best, Moderator (1994–1997)
  - Bill Phipps, Moderator (1997–2000)

=== Other Christian or Christian-derived faiths ===
- Ancient Church of the East –

- Mar Thoma Darmo, Patriarch (1968–1969)
- Mar Addai II, Patriarch (1970–2022)

- Assyrian Church of the East (complete list) –

- Shimun XVIII Rubil, Patriarch (1860–1903)
- Shimun XIX Benyamin, Patriarch (1903–1918)
- Shimun XX Paulos, Patriarch (1918–1920)
- Shimun XXI Eshai, Patriarch (1920–1975)
- Dinkha IV, Patriarch (1976–2015)

- Latter Day Saint movement –

- The Church of Jesus Christ of Latter-day Saints

- Lorenzo Snow, President of the Church (1898–1901)
- Joseph F. Smith, President of the Church (1901–1918)
- Heber J. Grant, President of the Church (1918–1945)
- George Albert Smith, President of the Church (1945–1951)
- David O. McKay, President of the Church (1951–1970)
- Joseph Fielding Smith, President of the Church (1970–1972)
- Harold B. Lee, President of the Church (1972–1973)
- Spencer W. Kimball, President of the Church (1973–1985)
- Ezra Taft Benson, President of the Church (1985–1994)
- Howard W. Hunter, President of the Church (1994–1995)
- Gordon B. Hinckley, President of the Church (1995–2008)

- Reorganized Church of Jesus Christ of Latter Day Saints (Community of Christ after 2001)

- Joseph Smith III, Prophet-President of the Church (1860–1914)
- Frederick M. Smith, Prophet-President of the Church (1915–1946)
- Israel A. Smith, Prophet-President of the Church (1946–1958)
- W. Wallace Smith, Prophet-President of the Church (1958–1978)
- Wallace B. Smith, Prophet-President of the Church (1978–1996)
- W. Grant McMurray, Prophet-President of the Church (1996–2004)

- Iglesia ni Cristo –

- Felix Manalo, Executive Minister (1914–1963)
- Eraño Manalo, Executive Minister (1963–2009)

- National Council of the Churches of Christ in the USA –

- Robert W. Edgar, General Secretary (1999–2007)

- World Council of Churches –

- Willem Adolf Visser 't Hooft, General Secretary (1938–1966)
- Eugene Carson Blake, General Secretary (1966–1972)
- Philip Potter, General Secretary (1972–1984)
- Emilio Castro, General Secretary (1985–1992)
- Konrad Raiser, General Secretary (1993–2003)

== Hinduism ==
- A. C. Bhaktivedanta Swami Prabhupada (1896–1977)
- Bhaktisiddhanta Sarasvati Thakura (1874–1937)
- Bhakti Hridaya Bon (1901–1982)
- Shrivatsa Goswami (1950 – present)
- Sri Chinmoy (1931–2007)

== Islam ==
=== Sunni ===
- Ottoman Caliphate -
  - Abdul Hamid II, Caliph of the Ottoman Empire (1876–1909)
  - Mehmed (Muhammed) V, Caliph of the Ottoman Empire (1909–1918)
  - Mehmed (Muhammed) VI, Caliph of the Ottoman Empire (1918–1922)
- Caliphate under the Republic of Turkey
  - Abdülmecid II, Caliph (1922–1924)
- Sharifian Caliphate
  - Hussein ibn Ali al-Hashimi, Caliph (1924)
- Sokoto Caliphate, West Africa (complete list) -

- Abdur Rahman Atiku, Caliph (1891–1902)
- Muhammadu Attahiru I, Caliph (1902–1903)

=== Shia ===
==== Twelver ====
- Twelver Islam

- Imams (complete list) –
- Muhammad al-Mahdi, Imam (874–present) Shia belief holds that he was hidden by Allah in 874.

- Marja

- Muhammad Kazim Khurasani (1895–1911)
- Mohammad-Hossein Naini (1911–1936)
- Abu al-Hasan al-Musawi al-Isfahani (1936–1946)
- Seyyed Hossein Tabatabaei Qomi (1946)
- Seyyed Hossein Borujerdi (1946–1961)
- Muhsin al-Hakim (1961–1970)
- Abu al-Qasim al-Khoei (1970–1992)
- Abd al-A'la al-Musawi al-Sabziwari (1992–1993)
- Ruhollah Khomeini (1970–1989)
- Mohammad Reza Golpaygani (1961–1993)
- Mohammad Mohammad Sadeq al-Sadr (1992–1999)
- Mohammad-Taqi Bahjat Foumani (1980–2009)
- Mohammad Fazel Lankarani (1980–2007)
- Ali Khamenei (1985–2026)
- Muhammad Saeed al-Hakim (1980–2021)
- Muhammad al-Fayadh (1980–2026)
- Ali al-Sistani (1980–)
- Naser Makarem Shirazi (1977–)
- Hossein Waheed Khorasani (1975–2026)
- Lotfollah Safi Golpaygani (1975–2022)

==== Ismaili ====
- Nizari (complete list) –

- Aga Khan III, 48th Imam (1885–1957)
- Aga Khan IV, 49th Imam (1957–2025)

- Dawoodi Bohra (complete list) –

- Mohammed Burhanuddin, Dai al-Mutlaq (1891–1905)
- Abdullah Badruddin, Dai al-Mutlaq (1905–1915)
- Taher Saifuddin, Dai al-Mutlaq (1915–1965)
- Mohammed Burhanuddin, Dai al-Mutlaq (1965–2014)

- Zaidiyyah (complete list) –

- al-Mansur Muhammad bin Yahya Hamid ad-Din, Imam (1890–1904)
- al-Mutawakkil Yahya Muhammad Hamid ad-Din, Imam (1904–1948)
- an-Nasir Ahmad bin Yahya, Imam (1948–1962)
- al-Mansur Muhammad al-Badr, Imam (1962)
- Hussein Badreddin al-Houthi, leader of the Houthis (1994–2004)

==== Dawat-e-Islami ====
- Muhammad Ilyas Qadri, Founder (1981–present)

=== Ahmadiyya ===
- Ahmadiyya –
  - Mirza Ghulam Ahmad, Mujaddid, Promised Messiah, Mahdi, Prophet and founder (1889–1908)
- Ahmadiyya Muslim Community –
  - Hakeem Noor-ud-Din, Khalifatul Masih (1908–1914)
  - Mirza Basheer-ud-Din Mahmood Ahmad, Khalifatul Masih (1914–1965)
  - Mirza Nasir Ahmad, Khalifatul Masih (1965–1982)
  - Mirza Tahir Ahmad, Khalifatul Masih (1982–2003)
- Lahore Ahmadiyya Movement –
  - Maulana Muhammad Ali, Emir (1914–1951)
  - Maulana Sadr-ud-Din, Emir (1951–1981)
  - Saeed Ahmad Khan, Emir (1981–1996)
  - Asghar Hameed, Emir (1996–2002)

=== Nation of Islam ===
- Nation of Islam

- Wallace Fard Muhammad, founder and leader (1930–1934)
- Elijah Muhammad, leader (1934–1975)
- Warith Deen Mohammed, leader (1975–1976) Established the World Community of Islam in the West (later American Muslim Mission, and then American Society of Muslims) in 1976, which he led until his death in 2003.
- Louis Farrakhan, leader (1981–present)

== Judaism and related ==
- Chabad Hasidism –
  - Sholom Dovber Schneersohn, Lubavitcher Rebbe (1882–1920)
  - Yosef Yitzchok Schneersohn, Lubavitcher Rebbe (1920–1950)
  - Menachem Mendel Schneerson, Lubavitcher Rebbe (1950–1994)
- United Kingdom and the British Commonwealth (complete list) –
  - Hermann Adler, Chief Rabbi (1891–1911)
  - Joseph Herman Hertz, Chief Rabbi (1913–1946)
  - Israel Brodie, Chief Rabbi (1948–1965)
  - Immanuel Jakobovits, Chief Rabbi (1966–1991)
  - Jonathan Sacks, Chief Rabbi (1991–2012)

Asia

- Israel/ British Mandate of Palestine, (complete list) –

  - Ashkenazi
    - Abraham Isaac Kook, Ashkenazi Chief Rabbi (1921–1935)
    - Isaac Halevi Herzog, Ashkenazi Chief Rabbi (1936–1959)
    - Isar Yehuda Unterman, Ashkenazi Chief Rabbi (1963–1972)
    - Shlomo Goren, Ashkenazi Chief Rabbi (1972–1983)
    - Avraham Shapira, Ashkenazi Chief Rabbi (1983–1993)
    - Israel Meir Lau, Ashkenazi Chief Rabbi (1993–2003)
  - Sephardic
    - Ya'akov Meir, Sephardic Chief Rabbi (1921–1939)
    - Benzion Uziel, Sephardic Chief Rabbi (1939–1954)
    - Yitzhak Nissim, Sephardic Chief Rabbi (1955–1972)
    - Ovadiah Yosef, Sephardic Chief Rabbi (1972–1983)
    - Mordechai Eliyahu, Sephardic Chief Rabbi (1983–1993)
    - Eliahu Bakshi-Doron, Sephardic Chief Rabbi (1993–2003)
  - Military Rabbinate
    - Shlomo Goren, Chief Rabbi (1948–1968)
    - Mordechai Peron, Chief Rabbi (1968–1977)
    - Gad Navon, Chief Rabbi (1977–2000)
    - Israel Weiss, Chief Rabbi (2000–2006)

Eurasia

- Russian Empire/ Soviet Union/ Russia –
  - Adolf Shayevich, Soviet Union's Chief Rabbi (1989–1991), Chief Rabbi of Russia (1993–present)
- Ottoman Empire/ Turkey –
  - Mose Levi, Chief Rabbi (1872–1909)
  - Haim Nahum, Chief Rabbi (1909–1920)
  - Sabetay Levi, Chief Rabbi (1920–1922)
  - Isak Ariel, Chief Rabbi (1922–1926)
  - Hayyim Moshe Bejerano, Chief Rabbi (1926–1931)
  - Hayim Izak Shaki, Chief Rabbi (1931–1940)
  - Rafael David Saban, Chief Rabbi (1940–1960)
  - David Asseo, Chief Rabbi (1961–2002)

Europe

- Ireland –
  - Yitzhak HaLevi Herzog, Chief Rabbi (1921–1937)
  - Immanuel Jakobovits, Chief Rabbi (1949–1958)
  - Isaac Cohen, Chief Rabbi (1959–1979)
  - David Rosen, Chief Rabbi (1979–1984)
  - Ephraim Mirvis, Chief Rabbi (1985–1996)
  - Gavin Broder, Chief Rabbi (1996–2000)

North America

- Union for Reform Judaism (North America) –
  - Eric Yoffie, President (1996–2012)

== Other ==
- Church of Scientology –
  - L. Ron Hubbard, Founder (1950–1986)
  - David Miscavige, Leader (1986–present)
- Falun Gong –
  - Li Hongzhi, Founder (1992–present)

=== Shinto ===
- Shintoism (complete list) –

- Akihito, Emperor of Japan, head of Shintoism (1989–2019)

- Jinja Honcho –

- Fusako Kitashirakawa, Chairperson (1947–1974)
- Kazuko Takatsukasa, Chairperson (1974–1988)
- Atsuko Ikeda, Chairperson (1988–present)

==== Sectarian Shinto ====
- Izumo-taishakyo –

- Senge Takaaki, Kancho (1887–1918)
- Senge Takamochi, Kancho (1918–1954)
- Senge Takanobu, Kancho (1954–1963)
- Senge Michihiko, Kancho (1963–2014)

- Konkokyo –

- Setsutane Konko, Spiritual Leader (1893–1963)
- Kagamitaro Konko, Spiritual Leader (1963–1991)
- Heiki Konko, Spiritual Leader (1991–2021)

- Kurozumikyō –

- Kurozumi Muneyasu, Chief Patriarch (1889–1936)
- Kurozumi Munekazu, Chief Patriarch (1936–1973)
- Kurozumi Muneharu, Chief Patriarch (1973–2017)

- Oomoto –

- Nao Deguchi, Spiritual Leader (1892–1918)
- Sumi Deguchi, Spiritual Leader (1918–1952)
- Naohi Deguchi, Spiritual Leader (1952–1990)
- Kiyoko Deguchi, Spiritual Leader (1990–2001)

=== West Asian origin ===
- W.A.P.I. Zoroastrians (Iranian Zoroastrians) –
  - Areez P. Khambatta, President

==== Baháʼí Faith ====
- Baháʼí Faith –
  - `Abdu'l-Bahá, Successor and head of the Baháʼí Faith (1892–1921)
  - Shoghi Effendi, Guardian of the Cause of God (1921–1957)
  - Hands of the Cause of God (1957–1963)
  - Universal House of Justice (1963–present)

==== Jainism ====
- Terapanthi Jains-
  - Acharya Mahaprajna (1995–2010)
- Śvetāmbara Jainism –
  - Dalcand, Acarya (1897–1909)
  - Kaluram, Acarya (1909–1936)
  - Tulsi, Acarya (1936–1994)
  - Mahaprajna, Acarya (1994–2010)

== See also ==
- Religious leaders by year
- List of state leaders in the 20th century (1901–1950)
- List of state leaders in the 20th century (1951–2000)
- List of governors of dependent territories in the 20th century
