= Seth Mokitimi =

- Seth Mokitimi
- Born: Seth Jason Molefi Mokitimi; 15 January 1904; Phahameng, Basutoland (Lesotho)
- Died: 25 November 1971, age 67; Bloemfontein, South Africa
- Education: Healdtown and Fort Hare University
- Occupations: Minister and educator
- Known for: First black President of the Methodist Church of Southern Africa
- Title: Reverend
- Spouse: Grace Mamonaheng (née Sello)

Seth Mokitimi (1904–1971) was a significant leader in the Methodist Church of Southern Africa (MCSA) during the 20th century. He fostered the development of education, especially theological education, and promoted the use of education as a tool in the struggle for liberation from apartheid in South Africa. Seth Mokitimi was also influential in the youthful development of several important South African leaders, among them Nelson Mandela. In 1963 the MCSA annual Conference elected Rev. Seth Mokitimi as their first black president, in which position he served one term during 1964 and 1965.
At the MCSA Conference of 2007, 36 years after his death, a proposal that the new Methodist Seminary to be built at Pietermaritzburg be named after Seth Mokitimi was approved with "overwhelming enthusiasm".

== Childhood and youth ==
Seth Jason Molefi Mokitimi was born on 15 January 1904 at Phahameng in what was then Basutoland (now Lesotho). As a young child he attended the local primary school, and worked as a livestock herder. For his secondary education, after completing Grade 7, he was sent to the Ohlange Institute near Durban, a Christian school of some local renown which inculcated a spirit of self-reliance in its graduates.

== Marriage and family ==
Seth Mokitimi was married to Grace Mamonaheng Sello in 1928. They had a single living child, Violet, and as a family were always very close. Grace died in 1974.

== Career ==
From 1921 to 1926 he attended the Healdtown college near Fort Beaufort in the Eastern Cape, South Africa, where he qualified as a teacher. Immediately thereafter he was appointed as a teacher at Healdtown, where he worked for four years (1927–1930). In 1931, having offered for the ministry and been accepted, Seth Mokitimi was sent to Wesley House for ministerial training. Wesley House was located at the "South African Native College", as Fort Hare University was then called. On completion of his training he was stationed at Zastron where he served as a probationer minister from 1933 until he was ordained in 1936. From 1937 to 1951, Seth Mokitimi served as chaplain at Healdtown, a position which was important to the spiritual formation of students at the college. From the Healdtown chaplaincy, Seth Mokitimi was appointed as governor at the Osborn Mission, where he served from 1952 to 1961. He was then stationed at Bensonvale Mission as governor from 1962 to 1965, and it was during the latter part of this period that he was also elected as president of the MCSA. His last station was as superintendent of the Bloemfontein Circuit, where he served from 1966 until his death in 1971.

=== Career timeline ===
Student (training as a teacher) at Healdtown, 1921–1926
Teacher at Healdtown, 1927–1930
Ministerial training at Wesley House, Fort Hare University, 1931–1932
Probationer Minister at Zastron, 1933–1936
Chaplain at Healdtown, 1937–1951
Governor & Superintendent at Osborn Mission, 1952–1961
Governor & Superintendent at Bensonvale Mission, 1962–1965
President of the MCSA, 1964–1965
Superintendent of Bloemfontein Circuit, 1966–1971

== Achievements ==
=== Healdtown ===
As chaplain at Healdtown Seth Mokitimi exercised his influence to combat division, whether due to racism, tribalism or sexism. He instituted a more organised approach to bible study throughout the school, as well as himself leading the confirmation classes and a uniracial Bible fellowship meeting for all staff members.
Of Mokitimi as chaplain at Healdtown, Nelson Mandela recalled in 2008:

Rev. Mokitimi had a tremendous impact on me. He was the chaplain at Healdtown when I was there as a student. He really moulded me. He influenced us. Of course we tried in our small ways to imitate him but we did not have the courage. It is good when you have heroes around you. Rev. Mokitimi was a hero.

=== Osborn Mission ===
When Seth Mokitimi was appointed to head the Osborn Mission, he became the first black minister to be appointed as a mission governor and superintendent. At Osborn Mission Mokitimi also built a girls' hostel, so that girls would have equal access to the education offered there.

=== Presidency ===
Seth Mokitimi was elected as president of the Methodist Church of Southern Africa at the annual Conference in October 1963., He was the first black minister to be elected as the leader of any major church denomination in South Africa.

This was just two years after Sharpeville, when apartheid was very much in the ascendancy in South Africa.

=== Other ===
Among other achievements, Seth Mokitimi was also the first black minister to be appointed as an examiner of theological education in the MCSA, and as a co-general secretary of the Missionary Department of the Methodist Church. He also wrote a number of seSotho hymns which are still in use today.

== Death ==
Rev. Seth Mokitimi died in Bloemfontein on 25 November 1971, of diabetes.

== See also ==
- List of 20th-century religious leaders
