= Robert J. Godfrey =

American bishop

- 3rd Presiding Bishop
- Church: Orthodox Anglican Communion
- See: Orthodox Anglican Church
- In office: 1995–2000
- Predecessor: George C. Schneller
- Successor: Scott Earle McLaughlin

Orders
- Ordination: 1993 by Hesbon O. Njera
- Consecration: 6 August 1995 by Samuel P. Scheibler and Hesbon O. Njera

Personal details
- Born: Robert Joseph Godfrey; 7 September 1937; Detroit, MI, USA

Robert Joseph Godfrey was the third Presiding Bishop of the Anglican Orthodox Church, Metropolitan Archbishop of the Orthodox Anglican Communion and the President of Cranmer Seminary. In 1960 Godfrey completed his undergraduate work in South Carolina at The Citadel. He also completed a Msster of Education degree from Western Maryland College, and a Ph.D. from Wayne State University. He continued his education with post-doctoral studies at the University of Southern California, Boston University, Temple University, University of Edinburgh (Scotland), University of Manchester (England), University of Michigan, University of Central Florida, University of South Carolina, Loyola University. He also completed a Master of Divinity and Doctor of Ministry degrees at Trinity Theological Seminary, graduating summa cum laude in both degree programs. Significantly, during his tenure as bishop, Godfrey changed the legal name of the jurisdiction to the "Episcopal Orthodox Christian Archdiocese of America," while retaining the original incorporation. The church is now known as the Orthodox Anglican Church, matching the name of the international communion to which it belongs.

Bishop Godfrey married in 1961, he and his wife had three children. He currently lives in retirement in northern Michigan. He continues to be actively involved in various Anglican projects.
