= Marinus Kok =

Dutch priest (1916-1999)

- Old Catholic Archbishop of Utrecht
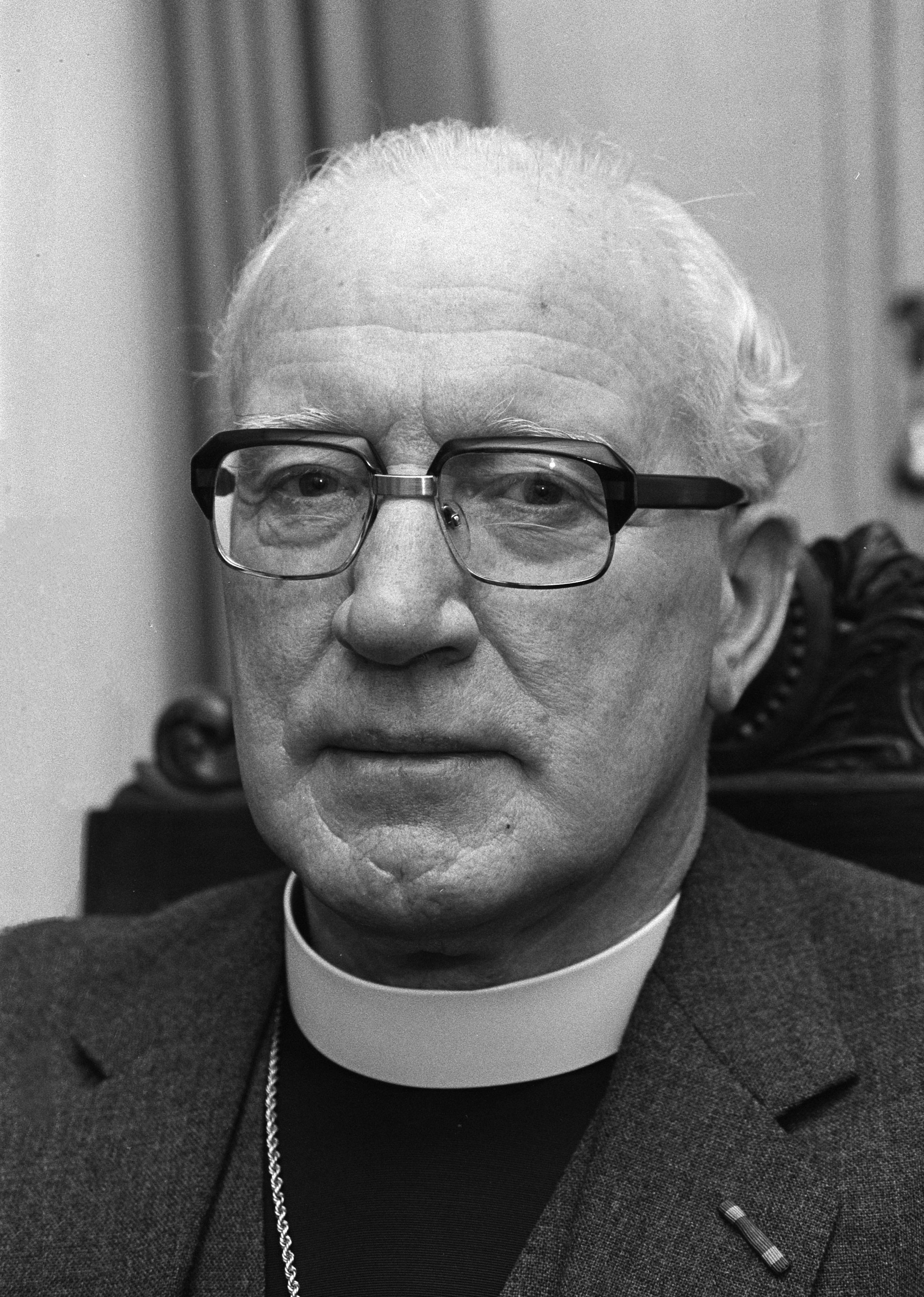
- Church: Old Catholic Church
- Archdiocese: Utrecht
- In office: 1970-1982
- Predecessor: Franciscus Kenninck
- Successor: Antonius Jan Glazemaker

Personal details
- Born: 8 February 1916 Leiden, Netherlands
- Died: 31 July 1999 (aged 83) Zeist, Netherlands

Marinus Kok (8 February 1916 - 31 July 1999) was a Dutch priest who served as the twentieth Archbishop of Utrecht from 1970 to 1982.

After studying at the Old Catholic Seminary in Amersfoort, Netherlands, he was ordained to the diaconate and priesthood in 1941. Kok served as a parish priest in Arnhem, Amersfoort and The Hague, while he served on the faculty of the Old Catholic Seminary in Amersfoort. He became a member of the Chapter of Utrecht in 1967, and rector of the seminary in Amersfoort in 1968. Kok was chosen in 1969 as coadjutor to Andreas Rinkel, the Archbishop of Utrecht. After Rinkel retired on November 8, 1970, he consecrated Kok on November 9, 1970. Kok retired as Archbishop of Utrecht on December 31, 1981.

Kok was married to Topy Smits (1914-2009). On July 31, 1999, he died at a hospital in Zeist at the age of 83.

Old Catholic Church titles
Preceded by Andreas Rinkel; 1937-1970	Old Catholic Archbishop of Utrecht; 1970-1982	Succeeded by Antonius Jan Glazemaker; 1982-2000

== Sources ==
Moss, C.B. (1948). The Old Catholic Movement: Its Origins and History. Berkeley, CA: The Apocryphal Press. ISBN 9780976402596.
