= Eva Burrows =

Australian Salvation Army Officer

General Eva Burrows AC OF
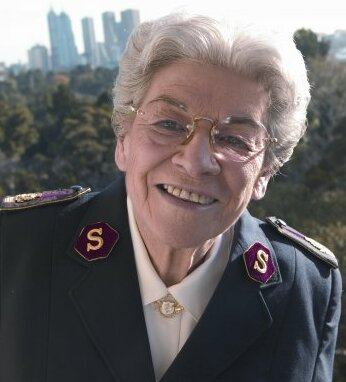
- Eva Burrows at The Salvation Army's Australia Southern Territory Training College

13th General of The Salvation Army
- In office 9 July 1986 – 9 July 1993
- Chief: Caughey Gauntlett; Ron A. Cox; Bramwell Tillsley
- Preceded by: Jarl Wahlström
- Succeeded by: Bramwell Tillsley

Personal details
- Born: 15 September 1929 Newcastle, New South Wales, Australia
- Died: 20 March 2015 (aged 85) Melbourne, Victoria, Australia
- Education: University of Queensland
- Occupation: Salvation Army Officer

Eva Evelyn Burrows AC OF (15 September 1929 – 20 March 2015) was an Australian Salvation Army Officer who was the 13th General of the Salvation Army, serving from 1986 to 1993. She served as an Officer of the Salvation Army from 1951 until her retirement in 1993. In 1993, Henry Gariepy released her biography, General of God's Army: the Authorized Biography of General Eva Burrows.

== Early life ==
Burrows was born on 15 September 1929 in Newcastle. Her parents, Robert John Guthrie Burrows and Ella Maria Watson Burrows, were both Salvation Army Officers. The couple had nine children: Dorothy, Joyce, Beverly, Walter, Robert, Bramwell, Elizabeth, Eva and Margaret. Because of her parents' itinerant lifestyle, Burrows' primary schooling was interrupted, but she completed her secondary education at Brisbane State High School, where she was selected as a prefect and Head Girl. From the age of seventeen, Burrows attended the University of Queensland and received her Bachelor of Arts in May 1950 with majors in English and History.

== Salvation Army ==
In 1950, Burrows entered The Salvation Army's International Training College in London. She was commissioned as a Salvation Army Officer in 1951. After studying at London University to be a teacher, she served at the Howard Institute in Rhodesia from 1952 to 1967, was Principal of the Usher Institute from 1966 to 1970, and served at the International College for Officers, at The Cedars, Sydenham Hill London, from 1970 to 1975, first as Assistant Principal, then as Principal.

Burrows became the leader of the Salvation Army's Social Services for Women in Great Britain in 1975, and leader of the Salvation Army's work in Sri Lanka in 1977. In 1980, she became leader of the Salvation Army's work in Scotland, followed in 1982 as leader of the Salvation Army's work in the Australian Southern Territory. In 1986, she was elected General of the Salvation Army by the slimmest margin in the history of the High Council (22 to 24 on the fourth ballot, a margin of one person's vote). In 1986, at 56, Burrows became the organization's youngest commander. Burrows was the only woman of seven candidates and was elected by the army's high council to replace the retiring General, Jarl Wahlström. During her seven years as the leader of the Salvation Army, she proved highly effective, directing operations in some 90 countries and reawakening the Army's founding spirit of evangelism by leading it back into Eastern Europe after the fall of communism. At the end of her term, she was extended a further two years because of her record and achievements.

Burrows completed a ten-year post on the Board of the International Bible Society (in 2005), and was the international Champion of the Be A Hero campaign, as well as sitting on the Board of Reference of The Salvation Army War College. She wrote A Field For Exploits: Training Leaders For The Salvation Army.

== Death ==
Burrows died aged 85 on 20 March 2015 at the Coppin Centre in Melbourne, Victoria.

== Honours ==
In the Australia Day Honours of 1986, Burrows was appointed an Officer of the Order of Australia (AO) with the citation "In recognition of service to the temporal and spiritual welfare of the community and to social justice as the world leader of the Salvation Army". In 1994 it was upgraded to Companion of the Order of Australia (AC).

In 1988, Burrows became an Honorary Doctor of Liberal Arts at Ewha Womans University in Seoul, and was awarded an Honorary LLD from Asbury University in the US in 1988. In December 1993, she received an honorary Doctor of Philosophy from her alma mater, the University of Queensland.

On 1 January 2001, Burrows received a Centenary Medal "[f]or service to the Australian community". In the same year she was also inducted to the Victorian Honour Roll of Women.

Burrows was inducted into the Queensland Business Leaders Hall of Fame in 2012.

On Friday 3 July 2015 (AEST), three months after her death, Burrows was awarded the highest honour of the Salvation Army posthumously, the "Order of the Founder" in a ceremony at Boundless, in London which celebrated 150 years of the Salvation Army. The award was received by Commissioner Tidd on behalf of the Burrows family.

The Eva Burrows College is named after her. It was established in 2018 following the merger of two existing colleges and operates in Sydney, Melbourne, and online, providing education and training for Salvation Army officers, employees and volunteers.

== Appointments and qualifications ==
Details	Location	Date
Soldier, Fortitude Valley, Queensland	Australia Eastern Territory	
Bachelor of Arts	Queensland University	1947–1950
Commissioned as an Officer	London, United Kingdom	1951
Post Graduate Certificate of Education	University of London, UK	1951–1952
Corps Work	British Territory (UK Territory)	1951–1952
Howard Institute	Rhodesia	1952–1967
Head of Teacher Training, Howard Institute	Rhodesia	1965
Vice-Principal, Howard Institute	Rhodesia	1965–1967
Principal, Usher Institute	Rhodesia	1967–1970
Assistant Principal, International College for Officers	London	1970–1974
Principal, International College for Officers	London	1974–1975
Leader of Women's Social Services	Great Britain	1975–1977
Territorial Commander	Sri Lanka Territory	1977–1979
Territorial Commander	Scotland Territory	1979–1982
Territorial Commander	Australia Southern Territory	1982–1986
General of The Salvation Army	Worldwide	1986–1993
Officer of the Order of Australia	Australia	1986
Master of Education	Sydney University	
Hon. Dr. Liberalium Artium (Dr. of Liberal Arts – DLA)	Ewha Womans University, Seoul	1988
Hon. Dr. of Laws (LLD)	Asbury College	1988
Paul Harris Fellow of Rotary International	Worldwide	1990
Hon. DST (Delta Sigma Theta)	Houghton College	1992
Hon. Dr. of Divinity (D.D.)	Olivet Nazarene University	1993
Hon. Dr. of Philosophy (PhD)	Queensland University	1993
Hon. Dr. of the University	Griffith University	1994
Companion of the Order of Australia	Australia	1994
Living Legacy Award, Women's International Center	United States	1996
Board, International Bible Society		1995–2005
Board of Reference, The Salvation Army War College	Vancouver & Chicago	

Religious titles
Preceded by Jarl Wahlström	General of The Salvation Army; 1986–1993	Succeeded by Bramwell Tillsley
