= Henry Gariepy =

Henry Gariepy (1930–2010) was an American Salvation Army officer and author. With his wife, he spearheaded and led the organisation's Hough Center in Cleveland, Ohio. He served as the editor of organisation's The War Cry magazine, and came up with the idea for the annual journal Word & Deed. He also served for 15 years as the organisation's national editor-in-chief and literary secretary. He was the author of more than 29 books, including 100 Portraits of Christ. After he retired, he worked as a guest speaker and as a professor at the Salvation Army's officer training college.

== Biography ==
Gariepy was born on 17 January 1930 in Meriden, Connecticut. He attended Lincoln Junior High School and Meriden High School. He obtained a Bachelor of Arts and a Master of Science from Cleveland State University. In 1948, Gariepy attended officer training with the Salvation Army and, in 1949, he was commissioned as an officer of the corps in 1949. In 1952, he married fellow Salvation Army officer, Marjorie Ramsdell.

Gariepy spearheaded the concept of a multi-purpose Salvation Army center, combining numerous Salvation Army services for collaborating with external organisations and, from 1969 to 1974, he and his wife ran the center in the Hough neighbourhood of Cleveland, Ohio. In Cleveland, he was also the president of the Kiwanis Club. After Cleveland, the pair served in Portland, Maine.

Gariepy served for 15 years as the National Editor in Chief and Literary Secretary. He was the editor of the organisation's magazine The War Cry. The annual journal Word & Deed was also his brainchild.

Gariepy retired in 1995. After he retired, he worked as a guest speaker and as a professor at the Salvation Army's College for Officer Training in Suffern, New York.

Gariepy died 3 April 2010 in Lancaster General Hospital in Lancaster, Pennsylvania and was interred at Monmouth Memorial Park in Tinton Falls, New Jersey. He was survived by his wife, Col. Marjorie Gariepy, one son and four daughters.

== Awards ==
In 1994, he was awarded an Alumni Lifetime Leadership Award from Cleveland State University.

He received the Order of the Founder in July 2007, the highest honor conferred by The Salvation Army.

== Notable works ==
He is the author of over 30 books and contributor to more than 100 works, ranging from devotional works to biography and history. One of his best known titles includes 100 Portraits of Christ, which has been produced in nine editions and several languages.

Other selected works include:

- A Century of Service In Alaska: The Story & Saga of the Salvation Army in the Last Frontier.
- Andy Miller: A legend and a legacy
- A Salvationist Treasury
- A Pen of Flame (editor)
- Challenge and Response
- Christianity in Action: The International History of The Salvation Army (2009)
- Daily Meditations on Golden Texts of the Bible (2004) Eerdmans Publishing
- 40 days with the Saviour
- General of God's Army, biography of General Eva Burrows
- Guidebook for Writer and Editors
- Healing in the HeartLand
- Israel L. Gaither: Man With a Mission (2006), a biography of the Salvation Army's first Black national commander, Israel Gaither
- Light in a Dark Place
- Man with a Mission
- Mobilized for God: History of the salvation Army Vol 8
- Portraits of Perseverance
- Songs in the Night: Inspiring Stories behind 100 Hymns Born in Trial and Suffering (1996) Eerdmans Publishing
- The Theology of Christmas (1991)
- Treasure from the Psalms: 100 Meditations from the Devotional Treasury of the Ages (2002) Eerdmans Publishing.
- When Life Gets Tough

== Critical reception ==
Of his Treasure from the Psalms (2002), the Ledger wrote "The meditations are thoughtful and draw from a sweeping range of literature, poetry, current events and Christian thought."

In the Associated Press review of his Songs in the Night, David Briggs found "The ability to retain a sense of hope amid tragedy is a common theme behind the compositions."
