= Emilio Castro =

Uruguayan Methodist minister

Rev. Dr. Emilio Castro
- General Secretary, World Council of Churches
- Church: Methodist Church of Uruguay (The denomination is in autonomous affiliation with the United Methodist Church.)
- In office: 1985-1992
- Predecessor: Philip Potter
- Successor: Konrad Raiser

Personal details
- Born: May 2, 1927 Montevideo, Uruguay
- Died: April 6, 2013 (aged 85) Montevideo, Uruguay

Emilio Castro (May 2, 1927 - April 6, 2013) was an Uruguayan Methodist minister. He served as general secretary of the World Council of Churches from 1985 to 1992.

== Biography ==
Emilio Castro was born on May 2, 1927, in Montevideo, Uruguay. His father was Chilean and his mother was Spanish.

He attend Union Theological Seminary in Buenos Aires, Argentina, competing his studies in 1950, and was ordained in the Evangelical Methodist Church of Uruguay. In his first few yours of ministry, he pastored churches in the cities of Trinidad, Durazno, and Pasos de los Toros.

From 1953 to 1954, he undertook a year of graduate studies with Karl Barth in Basel, Switzerland, with support from a grant by the World Council of Churches. He was the first Latin American to study with Barth.

From 1954 to 1956, Castro served as pastor of a Methodist church in La Paz, Bolivia. In February 1957, he returned to Montevideo, where he was assigned to the largest Methodist church in the city, the Central Methodist Church, located in the Centro district. During his pastorate there, he developed a religious television show which proved to be both popular and controversial because it addressed justice issues.

As a well-known religious leader in Uruguay, he became influential in establishing dialogue between opposing political groups. He also helped launch Frente Amplio, a coalition of democratic groups in the country. From 1965 to 1973, he worked with UNELAM, an ecumenical organization building Protestant unity across Latin America. He spoke out for human rights and opposed military dictatorships in the 70s and 80s.

In 1973, he joined the staff of the World Council of Churches at their headquarters in Geneva, Switzerland, as director of its Commission on World Mission and Evangelism (CWME). In 1975, he authored Amidst Revolution, which reflected on the contemporary issues facing the Christian churches in Latin America. He was influential in the crafting of a major ecumenical statement on mission, Mission and Evangelism: An Ecumenical Affirmation, which was issued by the WCC in 1982. In 1984, he completed his doctorate at the University of Lausanne.

He became the WCC's fourth general secretary in 1985, succeeding Philip Potter. He served for seven years, during which time there were major changes in Eastern Europe as the Soviet Union broke apart. Castro was supportive of the Orthodox churches in the region, and advocated for their needs. During his term as president, he oversaw the launch of the Peace, Justice and Integrity of Creation program, which was designed to encourage churches to re-envision mission work, and to encourage collaborative work on social justice among churches inside and outside the council. Castro is also noted for establishing closer relationships with evangelical churches that were not members of the World Council of Churches. In 1992, he published A Passion for Unity: Essays on Ecumenical Hopes and Challenges.

He completed his term in 1992, and was succeeded by Konrad Raiser, who became the fifth general secretary of the WCC.

Castro died in Uruguay on April 6, 2013.

== Awards ==
On October 14, 2009, Castro received the Orden de Bernardo O'Higgins, an award granted by the government of Chile to non-Chileans. He was recognized for his work defending human rights during the time of Pinochet.

== Legacy ==
Castro has been described by Methodist Bishop Rosemarie Wenner as "one of the role models not only for Christians in Latin America but for Methodists all over the world"

== See also ==
Emilio Castro - in Spanish
