= James Parker Dees =

- 1st Presiding Bishop
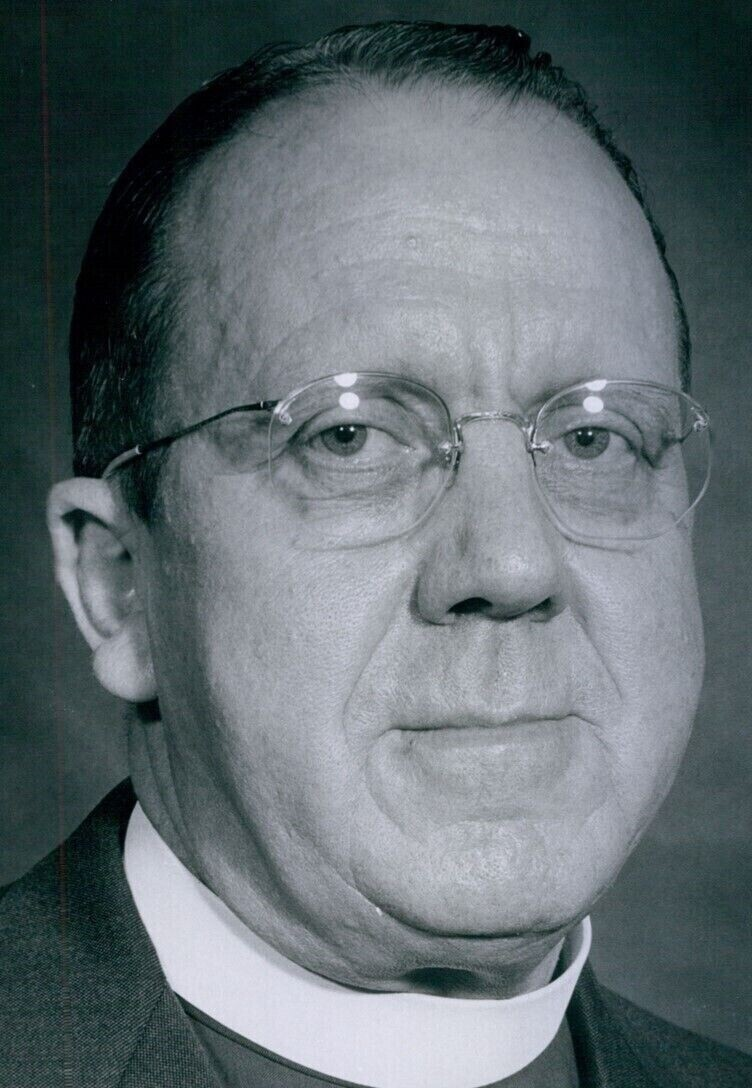
- Dees in 1971
- Church: Orthodox Anglican Church
- In office: 1963–1990
- Predecessor: None
- Successor: George C. Schneller

Personal details
- Born: 30 December 1915 Greenville, North Carolina, US
- Died: December 25, 1990 (aged 74) USA

James Parker Dees was an American bishop. He was the founder and first bishop of the Orthodox Anglican Church and the Orthodox Anglican Communion.

He was ordained as a deacon in the Episcopal Church on June 29, 1949; and as a priest by Thomas Henry Wright, Bishop of East Carolina, at the Church of the Holy Cross, in Aurora, North Carolina, on January 19, 1950. As a member of the Diocese of North Carolina, he served in charges in Aurora, Beaufort, and Statesville. His opposition to racial desegregation caused him to withdraw from the denomination in 1963. Dees was discouraged from joining the Reformed Episcopal Church by fundamentalist leader Carl McIntire because of the REC's alleged association with groups perceived as being neo-evangelical. The decision to form a new jurisdiction was made. Dees founded the Anglican Orthodox Church on November 17, 1963 - the first religious body to withdraw from PECUSA in the modern era. On Passion Sunday, March 15, 1964, Dees was consecrated a bishop by Wasyl Sawyna of the Holy Ukrainian Autocephalic Orthodox Church of North and South America, assisted by Orlando Jacques Woodward of the United Episcopal Church (1945) Anglican/Celtic Rite.

Dees received the honorary degree of Doctor of Divinity from Bob Jones University in 1965.

In 1967, Dees founded the Orthodox Anglican Communion. Later, the Cranmer Seminary, the theological college of the jurisdiction and the communion, was founded.

Dees died during heart surgery on December 25, 1990. Dees' successor as presiding bishop of the Anglican Orthodox Church was Jerry Ogles.
