= Elisabeth Raiser =

German historian (born 1940)

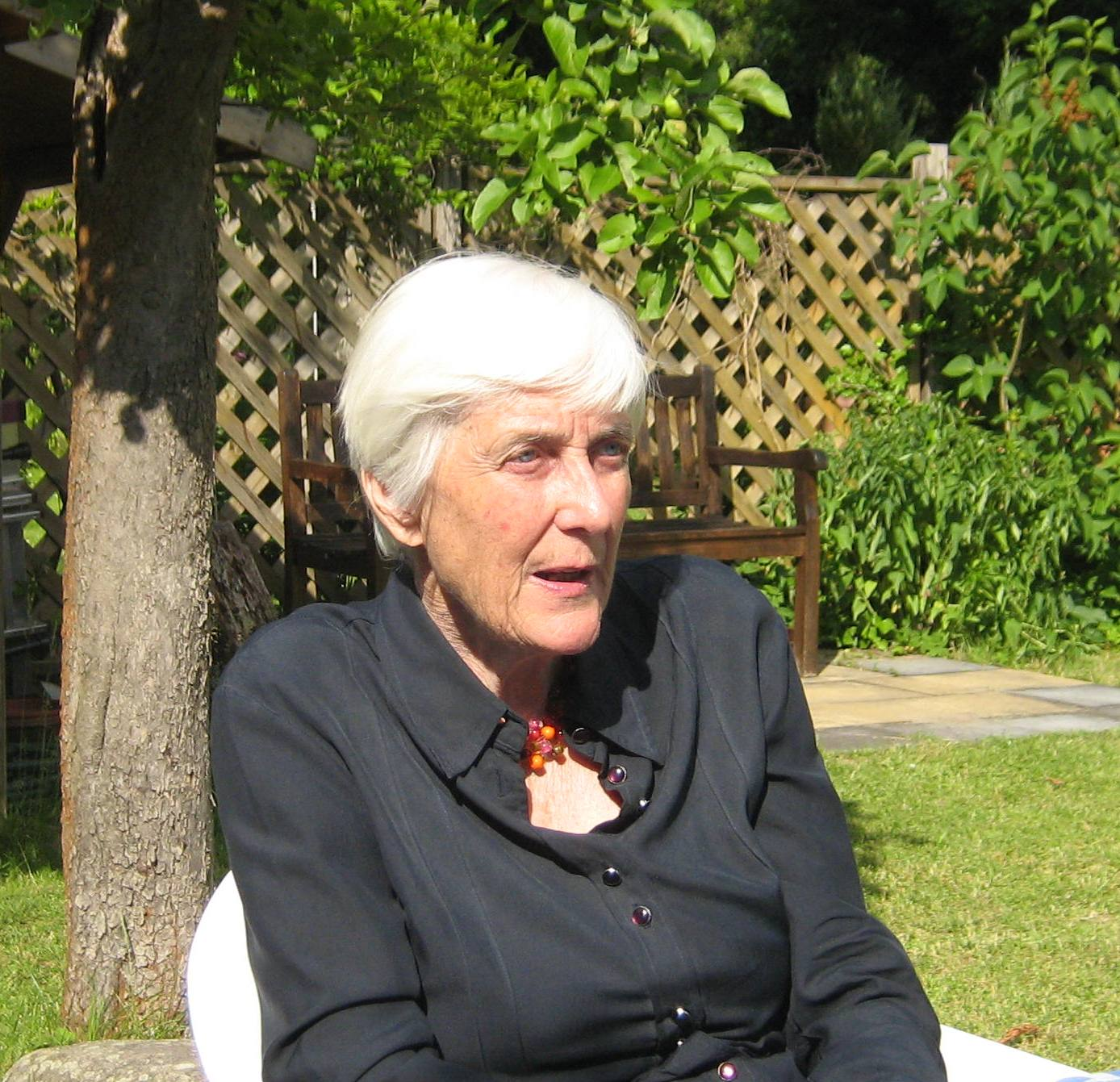
- Elisabeth Raiser, Berlin, 2012
- Born: Bertha Elisabeth Freiin von Weizsäcker; August 18, 1940 (age 86); Zurich, Switzerland
- Occupation: Historian
- Spouse: Rev. Dr. Konrad Raiser
- Parent: Carl Friedrich von Weizsäcker

Elisabeth Raiser (née Bertha Elisabeth Freiin von Weizsäcker) is a 21st-century historian, former President of the German Evangelical Church Assembly, and daughter of Carl Friedrich von Weizsäcker.

== Life and career ==
Born as Bertha Elisabeth Freiin von Weizsäcker in Zurich, Switzerland on August 18, 1940, Elisabeth Raiser is the daughter of polymath Carl Friedrich von Weizsäcker and niece of Richard von Weizsäcker, former president of the Federal Republic of Germany.

Her husband is Reverend Dr. Konrad Raiser.

She studied history and Romance languages and, like her mother before her, earned her doctorate in history from the University of Hamburg. In addition, she has been active with various ecumenical activities throughout her life, and served as the president of the first German Evangelical Church Assembly.

In June 2018, she and her husband spoke at the Pfarrhaustreff in Diedersdorf and introduced a short version of Kreisgang, the film she directed regarding her father's life and work as a philosopher, physicist and peace activist. The film explores the spiritual experiences which helped shape her father throughout his life, according to Potsdam's Märkische Allgemeine, including the "divine grace [which] prevented him and his colleagues from having to build the atomic bomb for Hitler" during the period he worked with Werner Heisenberg and Otto Hahn on Germany's uranium project.
