= Antonius Jan Glazemaker =

Old Catholic Archbishop of Utrecht

- Old Catholic Archbishop of Utrecht
- Church: Old Catholic Church
- Archdiocese: Utrecht
- In office: 1982–2000
- Predecessor: Marinus Kok
- Successor: Joris Vercammen

Personal details
- Born: 19 April 1931 Hilversum
- Died: 20 January 2018 (aged 86) Amersfoort

Antonius Jan Glazemaker (19 April 1931 – 20 January 2018) was a Dutch priest who served as the twenty-first Old Catholic Archbishop of Utrecht, from 1982 to 2000.

Born on April 19, 1931, to Old Catholic parents, Glazemaker was raised in the Netherlands during a period ecumenical initiatives and the creation of the World Council of Churches.

On July 1, 1956, Glazemaker was ordained to the priesthood in Hilversum by Archbishop of Utrecht Andreas Rinkel. In 1979, he was appointed the 13th bishop of Deventer, an office that he assumed on December 8, 1979, in IJmuiden, where he served as pastor.

On February 6, 1982, Glazemaker was elected Archbishop of Utrecht, succeeding Marinus Kok, who had retired.

Under his leadership, the Old Catholic Church allowed for remarriage after divorce and ordained its first woman priest in 1999.

Glazemaker retired as Archbishop of Utrecht on February 12, 2000.

Old Catholic Church titles
Preceded by Marinus Kok; 1970–1982	Old Catholic Archbishop of Utrecht; 1982–2000	Succeeded by Joris Vercammen; 2000 to 2020
