= George C. Schneller =

Second presiding bishop of the Orthodox Anglican Church

- 2nd Presiding Bishop
- Church: Orthodox Anglican Communion
- See: Anglican Orthodox Church
- In office: 1991 to 1994
- Predecessor: James Parker Dees
- Successor: Robert J. Godfrey

Orders
- Consecration: 27 October 1991 by Hesbon O. Njera, Laione Q. Vuki

Personal details
- Died: 8 June 2000

George C. Schneller was the second presiding bishop of the Orthodox Anglican Church and Metropolitan of the Orthodox Anglican Communion. He was born on February 22, 1921, in St. Louis, Missouri.

He was ordained to the priesthood on December 8, 1973, by James Parker Dees, and served as the rector of Holy Cross Anglican Church in St. Louis, Missouri for over two decades. He was consecrated to the episcopate on October 27, 1991, by Hesbon O. Njera, Presiding Bishop of Kenya and Laione Q. Vuki, a bishop in Polynesia, both were bishops of the Orthodox Anglican Communion. Schneller served his alma mater (1973) as the second president of Cranmer Seminary during the same period. Following the death of his wife and having health difficulties of his own, on January 9, 1993, he resigned his position as presiding bishop.
