= Salvation Army War College =

The Salvation Army War College
- Type: Private
- Established: 2003
- Principal: Nicole Brindle
- Undergraduates: Associate of Practical Ministry degree
- Location: Vancouver, British Columbia, Canada
- Campus: Urban

The Salvation Army War College was a discipleship training school established in 2003 by Founders Majors Stephen Court and Danielle Strickland, along with Pioneers Captains Ruth and Ian Gillingham. The War College began in Vancouver, British Columbia, Canada. In 2006 a War College campus was opened in Charlotte, North Carolina, United States by Death and Glory Alumni Heather and Rob Dolby and in 2008 another in Chicago, Illinois, United States by Envoys Jen and Josh Polanco.

== About ==
The War College was a one-year (including three three-month semesters and one two-month deployment) incarnational, biblically based, urban missions training college. The mission statement of the War College was "to equip and enlist warriors to win the world for Jesus."

The Salvation Army endorses the War College on divisional, territorial and international structural schemes in personnel, finances and curriculum.

In Vancouver, students live primarily in The Empress Hotel, a 77 unit slum hotel at the Main and Hastings intersection in Vancouver's Downtown Eastside. The Downtown Eastside of Vancouver is known for its addiction, poverty and prostitution rates. Students who attend the War College identify themselves with the poor and immerse themselves in the neighbourhood.

== Curriculum ==
Courses include Who is Jesus?, Biblical Interpretation, Extreme Prophetic, and Extreme Evangelism. There are modular courses that vary by year. A full list of the courses are in the college's website.

== Board of Reference/Faculty ==
The Board of Reference featured established leaders from around the world. They offered insight, spiritual support and endorsed The War College.

The War College local and/or visiting faculty included Aaron White, Cherie White, Major Doug Burr, Michael Collins, Major Winn Blackman, Faytene Kryskow, Patricia King, Commissioners Marilyn and William Francis, Nicole Brindle, and others.

== See also ==
- The Salvation Army, Canada
- Spiritual warfare
