= Fredrik A. Schiotz =

Fredrik Axel Schiotz (June 15, 1901 – February 25, 1989) was an American Lutheran church leader, president of the Evangelical Lutheran Church, president of the Lutheran World Federation, and presiding bishop of the American Lutheran Church.

== Biography ==
Fredrik Axel Schiotz was born in Chicago, Illinois. Both his father, Jacob Schiotz, and his mother, Stina Akerholt, had been immigrants from Norway. He graduated from St. Olaf College in Northfield, Minnesota ,(class of 1924) and earned a master's degree at Luther Theological Seminary in Saint Paul, Minnesota.

In 1954, Schiotz was elected as the first president of the historically Norwegian-American Evangelical Lutheran Church. In 1960, the Evangelical Lutheran Church along with the United Evangelical Lutheran Church and first American Lutheran Church merged to form The American Lutheran Church. Schiotz was elected president of the new body and served as the church's president until the end of 1970. He was the president of the Lutheran World Federation from 1963 to 1970 and of the central committee of World Council of Churches from 1961 to 1971.

Schiotz died on February 25, 1989.

== Selected bibliography ==
- One Man's Story (Minneapolis, MN: Augsburg Fortress Publishers. September 1981)

== Other sources ==
- Nelson, Clifford E. and E. Clifford Nelson Lutherans in North America (Minneapolis, MN: Augsburg Fortress Publishers. 1980)
