= Olof Sundby =

Swedish bishop (1917–1996)

The Most Reverend Olof Sundby
- Archbishop of Uppsala; Primate of Sweden
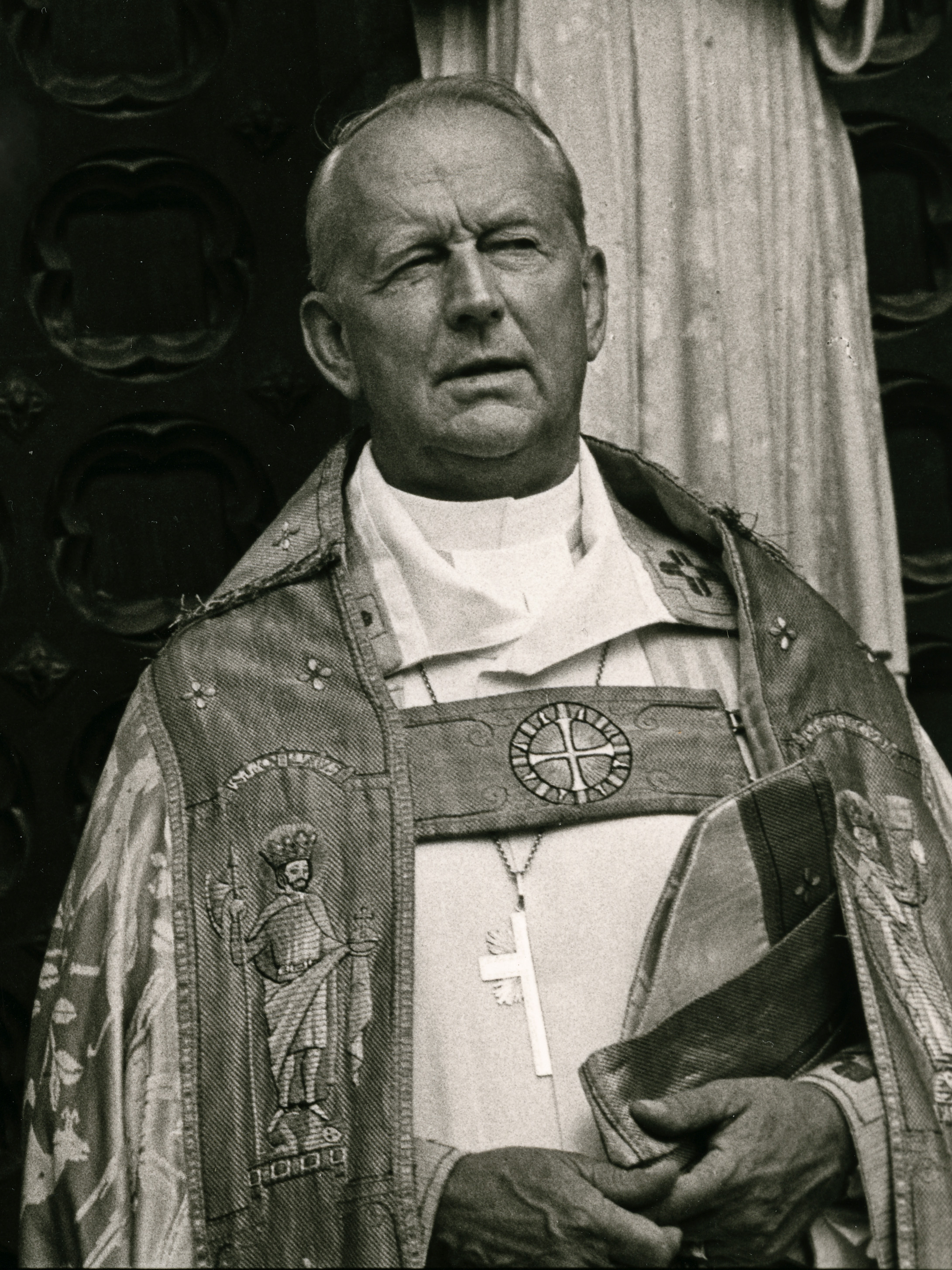
- Native name: Carl Olof Werner Sundby
- Church: Church of Sweden
- Archdiocese: Uppsala
- Appointed: 1972
- In office: 1972–1983
- Predecessor: Ruben Josefson
- Successor: Bertil Werkström
- Previous post: Bishop of Växjö (1970-1972)

Orders
- Ordination: 22 June 1943
- Consecration: 4 October 1970 by Ruben Josefson
- Rank: Metropolitan Archbishop

Personal details
- Born: 6 December 1917 Karlskoga, Sweden
- Died: 6 December 1996 (aged 79) Lund, Sweden
- Spouse: Brigitta Sundby
- Education: Lund University
- Coat of arms

Olof Sundby (6 December 1917 – 6 December 1996) was a Swedish bishop within the Church of Sweden. He was the archbishop of Uppsala in the period 1972–1983.

== Biography ==
Carl Olof Werner Sundby was born at Karlskoga in Örebro County, Sweden. Sundby was ordained a priest in the Diocese of Karlstad in 1943. He became a doctor of theology in 1959. He was a parish priest in the parishes of St. Peter's Priory, Lund and Norra Nöbbelöv in Lund from 1960–1970. He was bishop of the Diocese of Växjö from 1970–1972 and archbishop of Uppsala 1972–1983. He was Chairman of the Swedish Ecumenical Committee 1972–1983, chaired the Lutheran World Federation Executive Council 1973-77 and served as President of the World Council of Churches 1975–1983. Sundby died during 1996 and was buried at Klosterkyrkogården in Lund.

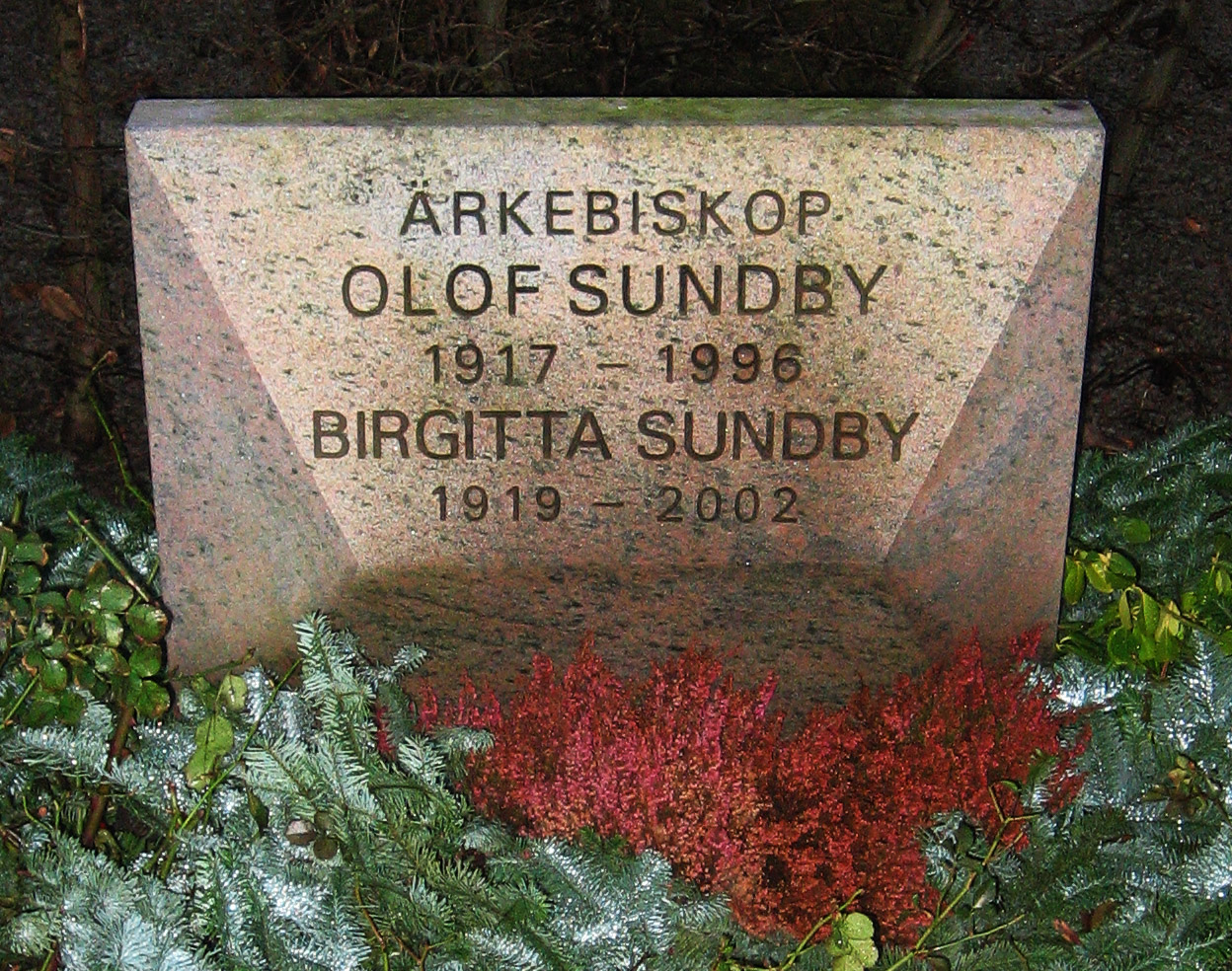
Olof Sundby grave at Klosterkyrkogården in Lund

== Other sources ==
- Hansson, Klas (2014) Svenska kyrkans primas: Ärkebiskopsämbetet i förändring 1914–1990 (Uppsala: Acta Universitatis Upsaliensi) ISBN 978-91-554-8897-0
