= Arnold Brown (Salvation Army) =

11th General of The Salvation Army

General Arnold Brown OC

11th General of The Salvation Army
- In office 5 July 1977 – 14 December 1981
- Preceded by: Clarence Wiseman
- Succeeded by: Jarl Wahlström

13th Chief of the Staff of The Salvation Army
- In office 1969–1974
- Preceded by: Erik Wickberg
- Succeeded by: Arthur E. Car

Personal details
- Born: 13 December 1913 London, England
- Died: 26 June 2002 (aged 88) Toronto, Ontario, Canada

Arnold Brown OC (13 December 1913 – 26 June 2002) was the 11th General of The Salvation Army (1977–1981).

== Biography ==
He was born in London, England, the son of officers of The Salvation Army. While he was still a young boy, his family immigrated to Canada, and it was from the corps in Belleville that he entered training, becoming an officer in 1935. A two-year corps command was followed by 10 years of service in the editorial department at territorial headquarters, where he became assistant editor of The War Cry. During that time he compiled a history of the first 50 years of Salvation Army ministry in Canada, entitled What Hath God Wrought?

Captain Brown and Lieutenant Jean Barclay were married 15 September 1939, and they gave 42 years of joint service before retiring from active leadership. They had two daughters, Heather Jean Brown and Beverley Ann Brown.

In 1962, the then Brigadier Brown was appointed as territorial youth secretary, an appointment where he gave leadership to the young Salvationists of Canada and Bermuda.

In 1964, there came a return to public relations work, this time at international headquarters, where Lieutenant-Colonel Brown was appointed as secretary for public relations, being promoted to the rank of colonel just a few months later. His imaginative leadership gave birth to the 'For God's Sake Care!' campaign, which raised the army's profile significantly throughout the United Kingdom, and changed the face of The Salvation Army's public relations work for all time. It was also under his direction that advisory boards were established in the UK.

Brown had a long-standing involvement with the Rotary Club movement, rising to high office in the London club and internationally. In his capacity as a Rotarian he was invited to address many international conferences, including those in Lausanne, Switzerland, in 1973 and in Montreal, Quebec, Canada, in 1975. Whenever he addressed Rotary, he proudly presented the story of God's Army and its contribution to the relief of suffering and need around the world.

Following an outstanding period of service in public relations, Commissioner Brown was appointed chief of the staff (the army's second-in-command) in October 1969, where he served for five years before returning to Canada as territorial commander in 1974. Three years later, the High Council of The Salvation Army elected him to become the 11th General of The Salvation Army. He took office on 5 July 1977.

Upon election, when asked what he wanted Salvationists to do, Brown said, 'Everything they can to make better known Jesus Christ and his saving power as the only hope for a sinning, suffering world; everything they can to demonstrate indisputably in what they say and do that the grace of God enables men and women to live clean and holy lives filled with the joy of service to God and their fellows; in short, everything they can to bring Heaven to earth.'

Brown and his wife travelled extensively during the four-and-a-half years he was in office. In 1980, Brown inaugurated the International Staff Songsters in London, and he continued to maintain a lively interest in their ministry, both in the UK and many other countries where they have travelled.

Brown received many honours during his lifetime, recognising his contribution to the field of literature as well as his work in the interests of the poor and underprivileged of society. He was made a Freeman of the City of London in 1978, an Officer of the Order of Canada in 1981 and, also in 1981, an honorary Doctor of Humane Letters from Asbury Theological Seminary and an honorary Doctor of Divinity from the Olivet Seminary in the US.

Many books were written by Brown, including What Hath God Wrought? The History of the Salvation Army in Canada, The Gate and the Light (autobiography), The Mountain the Wind Blew Here, With Christ at the Table and Occupied Manger – Unoccupied Tomb.

Brown died at age 92 in a hospital in Toronto, Ontario, Canada. His remains were interred at Mount Pleasant Cemetery, Toronto, Ontario, Canada in The Salvation Army plot.

General Brown especially took interest in Nigeria, and visited Lagos on occasion where he was greeted warmly by his lieutenants. Whilst in Lagos he stayed with Salvationists Douglas and Pamela Smith, Douglas being the son of Brigadier Earnest Smith.

Preceded by Clarence Wiseman	General of The Salvation Army; 1977–1981	Succeeded by Jarl Wahlström
