= Jarl Wahlström =

General of the Salvation Army (1918–1999)

General Jarl Wahlström
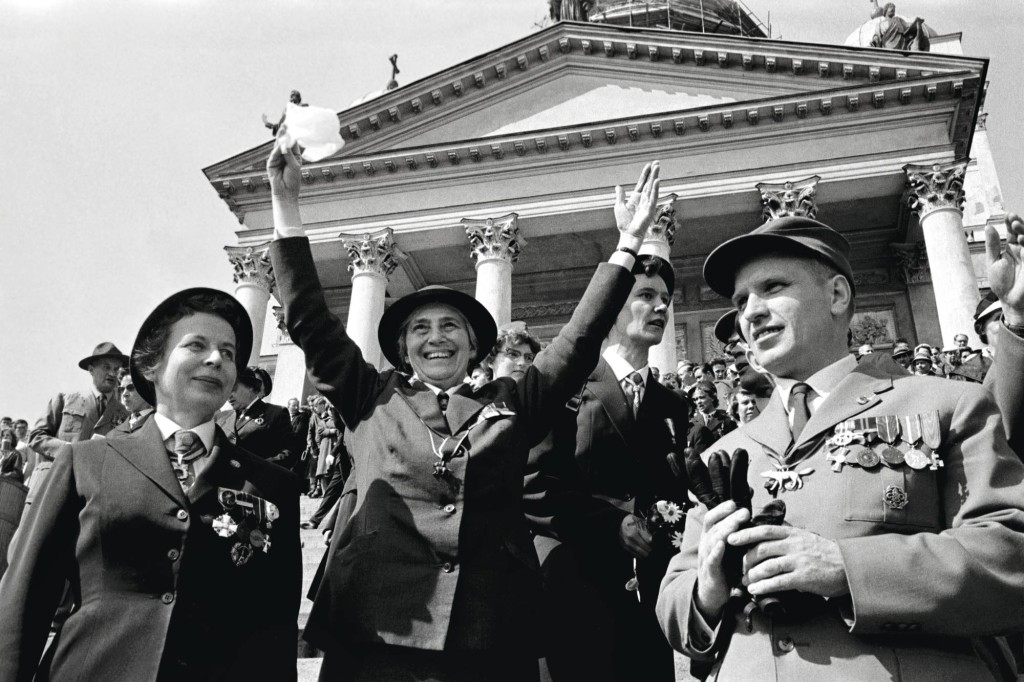
- Jarl Wahlström (right) together with Helvi Sipilä (left) during the visit of Lady Baden-Powell (middle) to Helsinki in 1960.

12th General of The Salvation Army
- In office 14 December 1981 – 9 July 1986
- Preceded by: Arnold Brown
- Succeeded by: Eva Burrows

Personal details
- Born: Jarl Holger Wahlström; 9 July 1918 Helsinki, Finland
- Died: 3 December 1999 (aged 81) Helsinki, Finland
- Spouse: Maire Nyberg

Jarl Holger Wahlström (9 July 1918 – 3 December 1999) was the 12th General of The Salvation Army (1981–86).

== Biography ==
Born to Colonel Rafael Wahlström, he was the youngest of five children. He grew up in Finland, as his father was the training principal. He became a Christian when he was seven years old. In 1937, he entered the International Training College in London, England, as a cadet in the Enthusiasts session, becoming an officer in 1938. His first appointment was assistant officer at the Oulu Corps. When World War II began, he was conscripted into the military for four years. The last two years of his military service were spent as battalion chaplain. He fought against the Soviet Union, during the Winter War and the Continuation War.

Upon his return in 1944, he married Lieutenant Maire Nyberg. He was appointed Finland's territorial scout organiser when the war ended. Seven years later, he was moved to the Helsinki division as the youth secretary. In 1963, he was appointed to the position of training principal for Finland. A year later, he became a Knight of the Order of the Lion of Finland because of his work in the Scout Movement.

Wahlström's first overseas appointment came in 1972, when he took up the position of chief secretary for the Canada and Bermuda Territory. He went on to become territorial commander in Finland in 1976 and then in Sweden in 1981. He was elected to the office of General later that year.

As General, he headed an International Leader's Conference of The Salvation Army in Berlin 1984 and a Holy Land Congress a year later. He also led the International Youth Congress in 1985 in Macomb, Illinois, USA. This was the first worldwide Salvation Army youth gathering since 1950 and the first international Salvation Army conference to be held outside the UK.

In 1986, Wahlström retired from active service, moving back to Helsinki. After a lengthy illness, he died in 1999.

== Legacy ==
He wrote song 857 in The Salvation Army Song Book (1986 version), "Great Joy Is Found in Serving Jesus". He was honoured with the Order of Civil Merit of South Korea receiving the Mugunghwa Medal in 1983. He gained an Honorary Doctorate in Humane Letters from Western Illinois University in 1985. Wahlström was honoured by Rotary International with a Paul Harris Fellowship in 1987 and was made a commander of the Order of the White Rose in Finland in 1989.

General Wahlström has also been credited with promoting the internationalization of the Salvation army, and furthering its ecumenical dialogue. He sought to find the "balance between denominationalism and ecumenism" and to "have an open mind and a sincere will to co-operate with Christians of other Churches".

Preceded by Arnold Brown	General of The Salvation Army; 1981–1986	Succeeded by Eva Burrows
