= Ruben Josefson =

Swedish bishop

The Most Reverend Ruben Josefson
- Archbishop of Uppsala; Primate of Sweden
- Native name: Per Love Ruben Josefson
- Church: Church of Sweden
- Archdiocese: Uppsala
- Appointed: 1967
- In office: 1967–1972
- Predecessor: Gunnar Hultgren
- Successor: Olof Sundby
- Previous post: Bishop of Härnösand (1958-1967)

Orders
- Ordination: 15 December 1940 by Erling Eidem
- Consecration: 18 January 1959 by Gunnar Hultgren
- Rank: Metropolitan Archbishop

Personal details
- Born: 25 August 1907 Svenljunga, Sweden
- Died: 19 March 1972 (aged 64) Uppsala, Sweden
- Buried: Uppsala gamla kyrkogård
- Parents: Per Linus Josefson; Alfrida Lovisa Christiansson
- Education: Uppsala University
- Coat of arms

Per Love Ruben Josefson (25 August 1907 – 19 March 1972) was a Swedish theologian and bishop in the Church of Sweden, who served as Archbishop of Uppsala from 1967 until his death in 1972.

Josefson was born in Svenljunga in the province of Västergötland. He enrolled at Uppsala University in 1926, became a graduate of theology there in 1931, theology licentiate in 1935, and doctor of theology in 1937. In 1940, he was ordained a priest. He was a very strong proponent of allowing women to be ordained as ministers in the Church of Sweden.

In 1945, he became the director of Fjellstedska Skolan, an educational institute for clergy and deacons in the Church of Sweden. He was head of the school until 1958, when he appointed as Bishop of the Diocese of Härnösand. In this position he served until his appointment as Archbishop of Uppsala in 1967, a post he held until his death in 1972.

== Other sources ==
- Hansson, Klas (2014) Svenska kyrkans primas: Ärkebiskopsämbetet i förändring 1914–1990 (Uppsala: Acta Universitatis Upsaliensi) ISBN 978-91-554-8897-0
