= Evangelical Anglican Church of America =

The Evangelical Anglican Church of America (EACA) was a traditional and conservative Christian church headquartered in Brea, California. It was constituted in 1992 (incorporated in the State of California on 5 May 1993) in order to stand against the perceived apostasy of the Episcopal Church in matters of theology, liturgy and morality.

The founder of the church was the archbishop emeritus of the United Episcopal Church of North America, the Most Reverend Charles David Doren.
