= Orthodox Anglican Communion =

Communion of Anglican churches

The Orthodox Anglican Communion (OAC) is a communion of churches established in the United States, in 1964 or 1967, by James Parker Dees. It was formed outside of the See of Canterbury and is not part of the Anglican Communion. The OAC adheres to the doctrine, discipline and worship contained in the 1662 Book of Common Prayer and the 1562 Articles of Religion.

The OAC was created as a conservative alternative to the mainstream Anglican Communion. Its presiding bishop also serves as its metropolitan. It claims to have "over one million lay members".

== Orthodox Anglican Church ==
Orthodox Anglican Church
- Crest of the Orthodox Anglican Church
- Orientation: Anglicanism
- Polity: Episcopal
- Presiding bishop: Joshua A Arena-Gilliam
- Associations: Orthodox Anglican Communion
- Official website: orthodoxanglican.us

The Orthodox Anglican Church is a member of the Orthodox Anglican Communion. It was founded as the Anglican Orthodox Church in 1963 or 1964 by James Parker Dees, in Statesville, North Carolina.

Dees died in 1990 and was succeeded as leader by George Schneller. Schneller resigned soon after due to illnesses, and the leader became Robert J. Godfrey. In 2000, Godfrey resigned; Scott McLaughlin succeeded him as leader, followed by Thomas Gordon. As of July 27, 2024, former ACNA clergyman Joshua Arena-Gilliam serves as the presiding bishop.

In 1999, the group changed its name to Episcopal Orthodox Christian Archdiocese of America. It then changed to Orthodox Anglican Church in 2005.

The organization "champions the 1928 Book of Common Prayer, emphasizes Christian orthodoxy, and insists on high moral standards".

Godfrey and McLaughlin were signatories to the Bartonville Agreement in 1999. In 2007, McLaughlin signed a Covenant of Intercommunion between the Orthodox Anglican Church and the Old Catholic Church in Slovakia, represented by Archbishop Augustín Bačinský.

== See also ==
- Traditional Anglican Church
