= Saint Andrew's Theological College and Seminary =

Saint Andrew's Theological College and Seminary (SATCS) is a church-affiliated educational institution of the Orthodox Anglican Church, the United States branch of the Orthodox Anglican Communion. Instruction began in Statesville, North Carolina in 1967 and the school was formally dedicated as Cranmer Seminary on September 19, 1971. Cranmer Seminary was officially incorporated in the state of North Carolina on September 3, 1975. A vocational school for the ministry, the seminary provided denominationally-specific theological training and education for traditional Anglican clergy. In 1996, a distance education program was initiated. From 1999 to 2003, the seminary actively assisted training clergy of the Anglican Rite Synod in the Americas, established an Internet presence and instituted open admission to the general public. The school was renamed Saint Andrew's Theological College and Seminary in 2002. Many of the bishops and leaders of the Continuing Anglican movement are past students and graduates of St. Andrew’s.

The school is headquartered in Charlotte, North Carolina, but has distributed campuses and offices of administration in South Carolina. Instruction is conducted via distance learning utilizing moodle and from these distributed campuses. Liturgical seminars are conducted in Charlotte, North Carolina and in Myrtle Beach, South Carolina.
