= Andreas Rinkel =

Dutch priest

- Old Catholic Archbishop of Utrecht
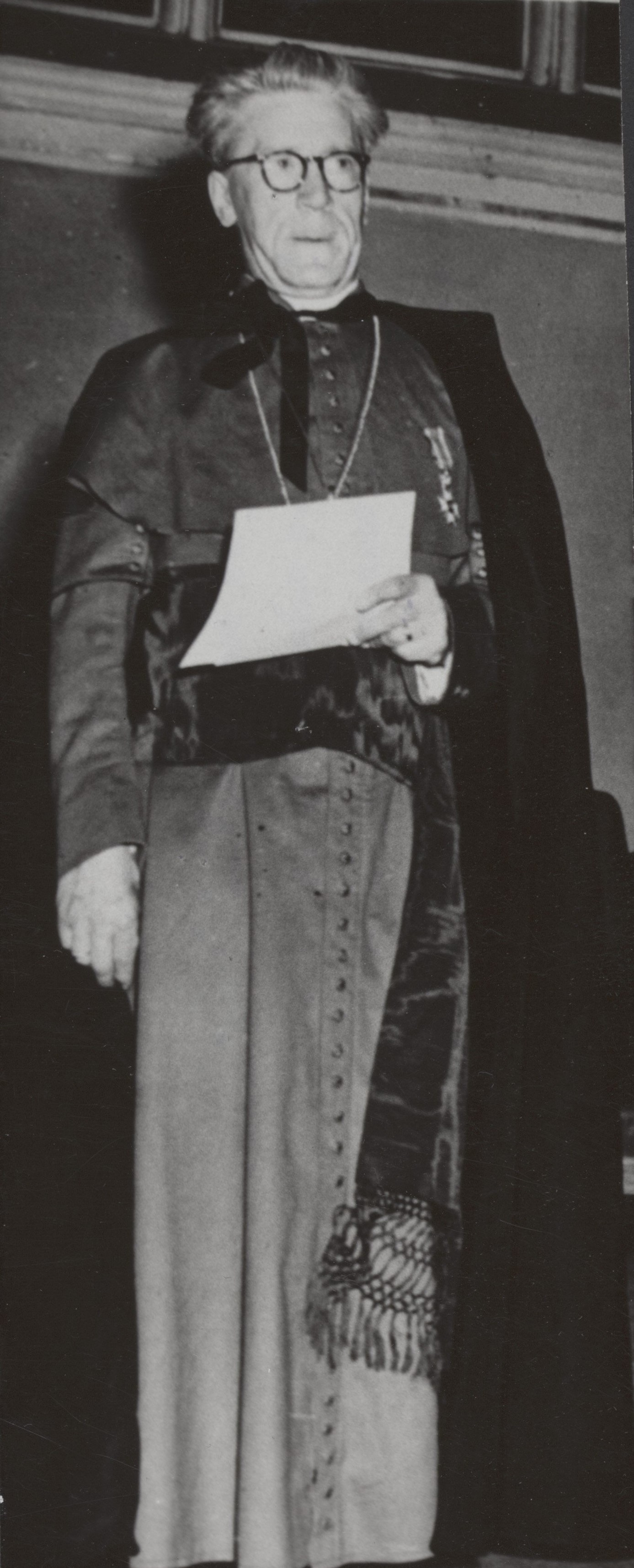
- Church: Old Catholic Church
- Archdiocese: Utrecht
- In office: 1937–1970
- Predecessor: Franciscus Kenninck
- Successor: Marinus Kok

Orders
- Consecration: 15 June 1937 by Johannes Hermannus Berends et al.

Personal details
- Born: 10 January 1889 Ouderkerk aan de Amstel, Netherlands
- Died: 25 March 1979 (aged 90) Utrecht, Netherlands

Andreas Rinkel (10 January 1889 – 25 March 1979) was a Dutch priest who served as the nineteenth Archbishop of Utrecht from 1937 to 1970.

== Early ministry ==
Before serving as Archbishop of Utrecht, Rinkel served as a parish priest in Amersfoort, Holland, and as a professor at the seminary there. He was part of the Old Catholic commission that worked toward the reconciliation of the Old Catholic Church with the Anglican Church.

== Archbishop of Utrecht ==
Following the death of Franciscus Kenninck, Archbishop of Utrecht, on 10 February 1937, Rinkel was consecrated Archbishop of Utrecht at St. Gertrude Cathedral in Utrecht by Bishop Johannes Hermannus Berends of Deventer, assisted by the Old Catholic bishops of Harlem, Germany, Switzerland, and Czechoslovakia.

== See also ==
- Catholic Church in the Netherlands
- Old Catholic Church

Old Catholic Church titles
Preceded by Franciscus Kenninck; 1920–1937	Old Catholic Archbishop of Utrecht; 1937–1970	Succeeded by Marinus Kok; 1970–1982
