= Franciscus Kenninck =

- Old Catholic Archbishop of Utrecht
- Church: Old Catholic Church
- Archdiocese: Utrecht
- In office: 1920-1937
- Predecessor: Gerardus Gul
- Successor: Andreas Rinkel

Orders
- Consecration: 1920 by Henricus Johannes Theodorus van Vlijmen, Edward Herzog & Georg Moog

Franciscus Kenninck served as the eighteenth Archbishop of Utrecht from 1920 to 1937.

== Early Ministry ==
Before serving as Archbishop of Utrecht, Kenninck served as president of Amersfoort Seminary in the Netherlands.

== Archbishop of Utrecht ==
Following the death of Gerardus Gul, Archbishop of Utrecht, in 1920, Kenninck was consecrated by Bishop Henricus Johannes Theodorus van Vlijmen of Haarlem, Bishop Edward Herzog of Bern, and Bishop Georg Moog of Bonn.

== Contributions to Old Catholicism ==
As Archbishop of Utrecht, Kenninck appointed a commission that led to the recognition of Anglican orders by the Old Catholic Church on 2 June 1925, thus clearing a path toward restored communion between the Old Catholic Church and the Church of England. In 1930, he was the first Archbishop of Utrecht to visit England, where, at the seventh Lambeth Conference of Anglican bishops, he declared that the Old Catholic Church recognized Anglican baptism, confirmation and communion as well. As a result, the Anglican Church recognized the Old Catholic Church, thus bringing the latter to the attention of Anglicans, including Anglican theologian C.B. Moss, who would later pen a work on the Old Catholic movement.

Kenninck is also remembered for abolishing compulsory clerical celibacy within the Old Catholic Church in 1922, and for making the constitutions of the Old Catholic Church more democratic.

== Death ==
After a lengthy illness, Kinninck died on 10 February 1937.

Old Catholic Church titles
| Preceded by Gerardus Gul; 1892-1920 | Old Catholic Archbishop of Utrecht; 1920-1937 | Succeeded by Andreas Rinkel; 1937-1970 |
