= Konrad Raiser =

German general secretary (born 1938)

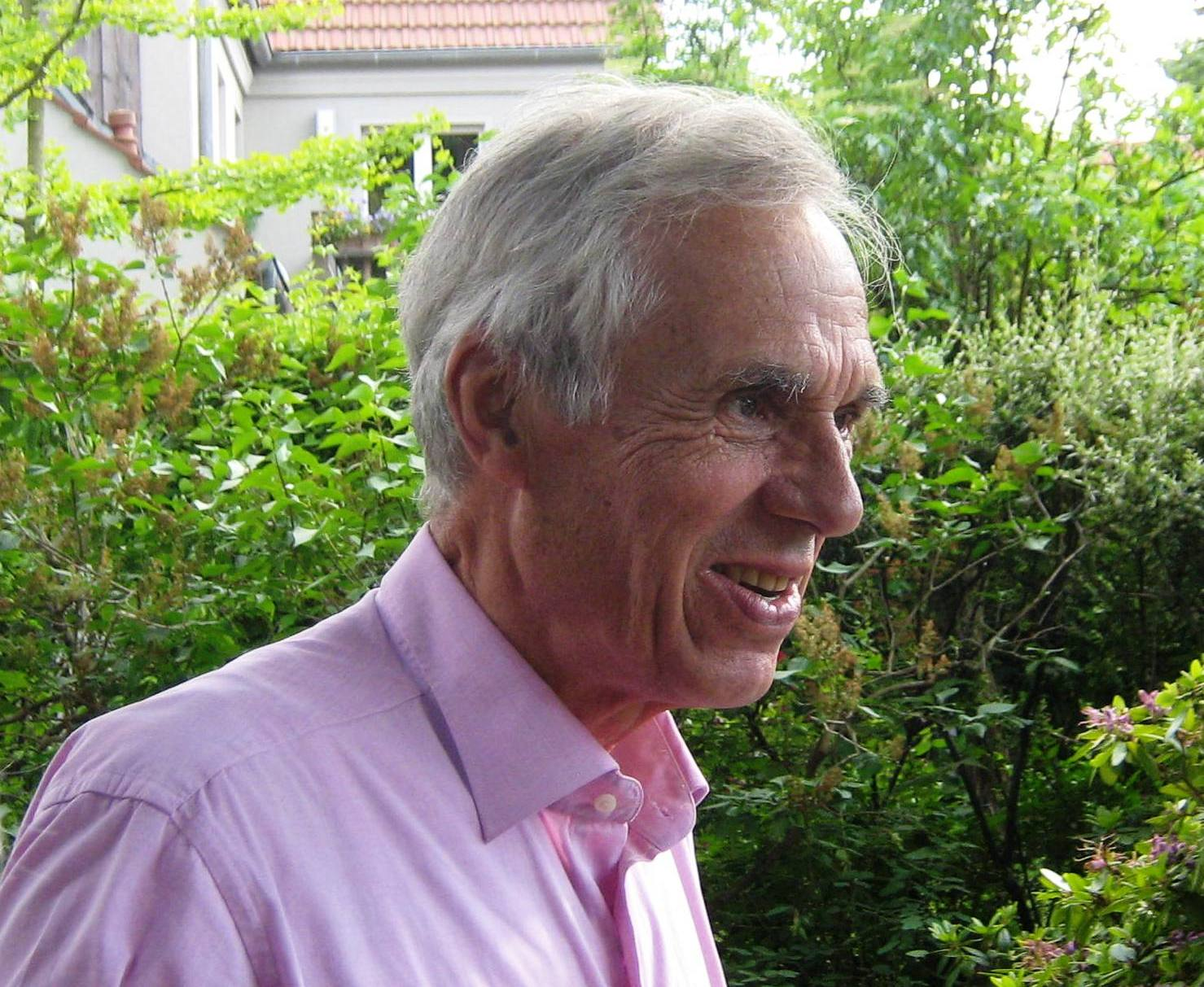
Konrad Raiser in Berlin, 2012

Konrad Raiser (born 25 January 1938) is a former General Secretary of the World Council of Churches (WCC).

== Biography ==
Born in Magdeburg, Germany on 25 January 1938, Raiser spent his childhood in Schwerin, Göttingen and Bad Godesberg. After graduating from high school in Tübingen in 1957, Raiser spent six months working in a steel mill in Dortmund, in a programme organised by his church, the Evangelical Church in Germany (EKD).

His father Ludwig Raiser, a well-known professor of law, was for some years president of the national synod of the EKD. Raiser began studying theology in Tübingen in 1957, moving on to the theological school in Bethel, and later to the universities of Heidelberg and Zürich. He concluded his academic theological education in Tübingen in February 1963, was ordained in May 1964 and finished pastoral training in 1965.and started working with the World Council of Churches, first in the department for Faith and Order.

He later became the Deputy General Secretary. Leaving the WCC in 1983, Raiser began to teach theology at Bochum University in Germany until he returned again to Geneva in 1992. In August 1992, the WCC Central Committee elected Raiser as general secretary for a five-year term. He assumed his responsibilities in January 1993, and in September 1996 was re-elected for a second five-year term which ran until the end of 2002. Noting the press of business facing the Council due to probable changes to be recommended by the Special Commission, and other items, the Central Committee, meeting in Potsdam in 2001, extended his term by one year to December 2003.

Raiser holds honorary doctorates from the Budapest Theological Academy (1992) and the University of Geneva (1996). He is the author of four books. His most recent is To Be the Church - Challenges and Hopes for a New Millennium, published by the WCC in 1997. Before that he wrote Identität und Sozialität published in 1971, Ökumene im Übergang, published in 1989 (of which an English translation, Ecumenism in Transition, was published in 1991), and Wir stehen noch am Anfang - Ökumene in einer veränderten Welt, published in 1994. Since 1970, he has written numerous articles and essays on theological and ecumenical subjects, including four entries in the Dictionary of the Ecumenical Movement (WCC Publications, 1991), for which he was also a member of the editorial board. As general secretary of the WCC, he was editor of The Ecumenical Review.

== Family ==
In 1967, he married the daughter of the physicist Carl Friedrich von Weizsäcker and niece of the future first president of unified Germany, Baron Richard von Weizsäcker, Dr. Elisabeth von Weizsäcker. The Raisers have four sons: Martin (b. 1967), Ulrich (b. 1970), Simon (b. 1974) and Christoph (b. 1978). Both Baron Richard von Weizsäcker (1964-1970 & 1979-1981) and his niece Dr. Elisabeth Raiser (2001–2003) were Presidents of the Deutscher Evangelischer Kirchentag (German Evangelical Church Congress).
