= Salvation Army brass bands in Australia =

Salvation Army bands have a long history in Australia, with the first established in 1881 in Adelaide, South Australia. By the late 1990s, Australia had 200 senior and 130 junior Salvation Army brass bands.

== Bands ==
The following are Salvation Army Bands based in Australia:

Band	Founded	Current Bandmaster
Adelaide Congress Hall Band		Rod Carger
Albury Corps Band of The Salvation Army
Armidale Corps Band of The Salvation Army		
Belmore Band of The Salvation Army		Joshua Kim
Blacktown Band of The Salvation Army		Doug Hardy
Brisbane City Temple Band of The Salvation Army	1885	Tim Green
Bundamba Band of The Salvation Army		Gary Rule
Campsie Brass Band of The Salvation Army	1912	Glendon Hanna
Capricorn Region Brass Band of The Salvation Army		Gavin Ivers
Carindale Brass Band of The Salvation Army		Jared Proellocks
Chatswood Citadel Band of The Salvation Army		Malcolm Beeson
Dulwich Hill Temple Band of The Salvation Army	1887	
Fassifern Corps Band of The Salvation Army		
Gold Coast Temple Band of The Salvation Army		Jonathan McCorriston
Gosford Corps of The Salvation Army		Glen Kuiper
Grafton Band of The Salvation Army		Rod Hill
Grafton Just Brass		Garrett Salter
Gympie Corps Band of The Salvation Army		
Hurstville Citadel Band of The Salvation Army	1900	Steven Reay
Illawarra Seniors Band		Graeme Packer
Locker Valley Corps Band of The Salvation Army		
Maitland City Corps Band of The Salvation Army		David Walz
Maryborough Corps Band of The Salvation Army		
Melbourne Staff Band of The Salvation Army	1890	Ken Waterworth
Melbourne Veterans Band of The Salvation Army	1982	Noel Jones
Nambour Citadel Band of The Salvation Army		Matt Seaman
Nambour Just Brass		Matt Seaman
Newcastle Citadel Band of The Salvation Army		
Orange Corps Band of The Salvation Army		
Orange Just Brass		
Parramatta Citadel Band of The Salvation Army		David Collinson
Parramatta Citadel Young People's Band of The Salvation Army		Major Colin Young
Pine Rivers Band of The Salvation Army		Gordon Thomson
Port Macquarie Band of The Salvation Army		Jim Gebhardt
Queensland Divisional Fellowship Band		Martin Rowden
Redcliffe City Band of The Salvation Army		Lt Col Brian Hood
Redcliffe City Just Brass		Myra Janiczak
Springwood Corp Band of The Salvation Army		Ryan Greenaway
Stafford Corps Band of The Salvation Army		Cameron Rablin
Sydney Salvation Brass		Glen Kuiper
Sydney Congress Hall Band of The Salvation Army	1882	Not Applicable since June 2017
Sydney Congress Hall Auxiliary Band	1932	Not Applicable - non-existent
Sydney Veterans Band of The Salvation Army	1987	Phillip Newton
Sydney Youth Band of The Salvation Army	2001	Captain Peter Gott
Tuggeranong Band of The Salvation Army		Bruce Edwards
Tuggeranong Young People's Band of The Salvation Army		Curtis Valtonen
Taree Corps Band of The Salvation Army		Kevin Cause
Taree Junior Band of The Salvation Army		Kevin Cause
Warwick Corps Band of The Salvation Army		Adam Cole
Wollongong Citadel Band of The Salvation Army		Joe McIver
Wollongong Citadel Young People's Band of The Salvation Army		Jason Follett
