= The Salvation Army, Australia Eastern Territory =

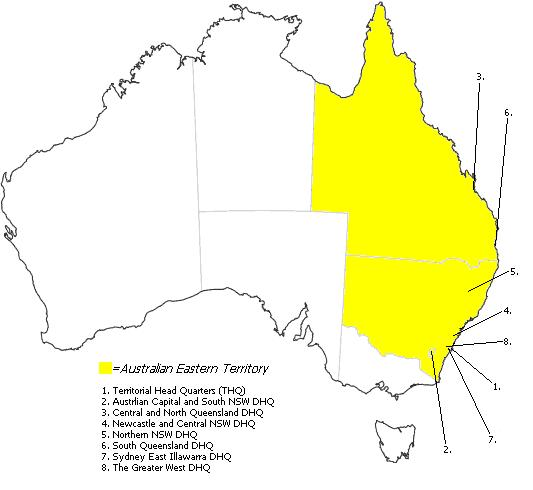
- Map showing previous locations of Territorial Headquarters (THQ) and Divisional Headquarters (DHQ) in the AUE.
- Abbreviation: AUE
- Headquarters: 261-265 Chalmers St, Redfern, New South Wales
- Region served: Australian Capital Territory; New South Wales; Queensland
- Services: Accommodation and refuges; Addiction services; Aged care services; Domestic violence; Employment services; Family and personal support; Financial assistance; Human trafficking and slavery; Legal services; Missing persons; Problem gambling; Youth services
- Territorial Commander
- Affiliations: The Salvation Army in Australia
- Website: salvos.org.au

The Salvation Army, Australia Eastern Territory or (AUE) was one of two administrative territories that The Salvation Army was divided into within Australia and covered two states and one Australian territory on the east coast of the country. The AUE was geographically sub-divided into two divisions, under different Divisional Commanders, each reporting directly to the Territorial Commander. Its headquarters was located at 261-265 Chalmers St, Redfern NSW 2016.

On Friday 30 November 2018, General Brian Peddle announced that the Southern Territory and Eastern Territory were reunited and The Salvation Army in Australia would again be one territory.

== History ==
The Salvation Army in Australia was originally treated administratively as one entity, known as The Australasian Territory from 1880 until it was renamed The Australian Territory in 1907, which it remained until the split into two territories in 1921. Whilst the territory as a whole came into being in 1880, the Army's work did not spread to New South Wales until 4 December 1882, and to Queensland in 1885.

After the Great War of 1814–1918, Bramwell Booth made a tour of global Salvation Army operations, and ordered numerous changes to its upper ranks, to advance his vision of a cohesive organisation. In October 1920 Commissioner James Hay (1865–1962) announced changes to its Territorial Division, which included Australia, breaking its command into two rival divisions under commissioners of similar ranking: Colonel Ernest Knight of the Melbourne Training College becoming chief secretary for the eastern territory, in Sydney, and Commissioner William J. Richards in charge of the southern territory, in Melbourne.

These states now, along with the Australian Capital Territory (which was founded in 1938) make up the AUE. All remaining states and the Northern Territory are part of The Salvation Army, Australia Southern Territory. Commissioners James Condon and Floyd Tidd announced in 2015 that the two territories would be reunited over a three-year period through the Australia One project.

== Structure ==
Until 2015, The Salvation Army in Australia did not have a National Commander, as other territories may, but rather, each of its two Territories is responsible to International Headquarters (IHQ). As of 2015, Commissioner Floyd Tidd was appointed as National Commander, and each of the two territories were appointed a Chief-Secretary-In-Charge during the Australia One unification process. Once this process has completed, the peak role within the territory will revert to the title of Territorial Commander.

The Territorial Commander (TC) and Chief Secretary are appointed by The General, their role is to oversee and administer the work of The Salvation Army within the Territory, they are assisted by various other Secretaries (departmental heads) who are, in turn, responsible for overseeing their various branches of Army activity.

The TC is responsible for the Army's overall operation and mission, and the Chief Secretary is responsible for the territory's administration and daily operations. Senior executive Officers are, on the recommendation of the Territorial Commander, also appointed by the General.

All other Officer appointments within a Territory are the responsibility of the Territorial Commander and The Cabinet. This Cabinet refers to the territory's administrative System. The five member Administrative Cabinet – similar to a Board – determines policy and strategy for the Territory, particularly as it relates to the future.

== Divisions ==
The AUE is further broken up into smaller administrative regions called Divisions, controlled by a Divisional Headquarters (or DHQ) and headed by a Divisional Commander. The AUE is broken up into two divisions with the DHQ located in the state capital cities:

Division	Headquarters	Commander	Corps	Centres
New South Wales and Australian Capital Territory Division	Auburn	Lt Col Miriam Gluyas	100	
Queensland Division	Spring Hill	Lt Col David Godkin	70	

== Music ==
The AUE is home to many Salvation Army musical sections, at Corps, Divisional and Territorial levels. Some groups of note include the Sydney Staff Songsters (Territorial), The Sydney Youth Band (Divisional). This territory is also well known for having many Salvation Army Bands, a list of which is found here.

== Australian sex abuse cases ==
On 28 January 2014, the Royal Commission into Institutional Responses to Child Sexual Abuse, a royal commission of inquiry initiated in 2013 by the Australian Government and supported by all of its state governments, began an investigation into abuse cases at the Alkira Salvation Army Home for Boys at Indooroopilly; the Riverview Training Farm (also known as Endeavour Training Farm) at Riverview – both in Queensland; the Bexley Boys' Home at Bexley; and the Gill Memorial Home at Goulburn – both in New South Wales. The investigation also examined The Salvation Army's processes in investigating, disciplining, removing and/or transferring anyone accused of, or found to have engaged in, child sexual abuse in these homes. On 27 March 2014, the Royal Commission began an investigation into the handling by The Salvation Army (Eastern Territory) of claims of child sexual abuse between 1993 and 2014.

The Royal Commission published a case study report on the findings and recommendations for one of the abovementioned case studies.

== Notable officers from or that served in the Territory ==
- General Eva Burrows
- General George Carpenter
- General John Gowans
- Brigadier Arthur McIlveen
- General Linda Bond

== See also ==
- The Salvation Army in Australia
- The Salvation Army, Australia Southern Territory
- The Salvation Army, Parramatta
- The Salvation Army, Sydney Congress Hall
