= Maidenhead Citadel Band =

Salvation Army band

Maidenhead Citadel Band (MCB) is a Salvation Army Band and part of the Maidenhead Corps of The Salvation Army. For over 120 years the band has consistently contributed to the worship and evangelical outreach promoted by the Maidenhead Corps in the Royal Borough of Windsor and Maidenhead.

== Brief history ==
The Band can trace its history back to 1886 when William Thomas, a young farmer from the Salisbury area moved to Maidenhead and became the first Bandmaster of Maidenhead Citadel Band.

On 25 June 1892, 18 members of Maidenhead Band were arrested during an open-air meeting as they "unlawfully obstructed the free passage of the Highway by standing together for the space of twenty minutes." Bandmaster William Thomas took responsibility for the Band's actions and was sentenced to several months manual labour in Reading Gaol.

In more recent times the size of the Band has fluctuated but has experienced a revival under the leadership of the current Bandmaster Stuart Hall, who is also a member of the International Staff Band.

The Band is possibly now the biggest it has ever been with many young players still entering from the junior sections.

Over the years Maidenhead Band has contributed many players to the Salvation Army's "Premier" Staff Bands. To date five Maidenhead Bandsmen have been members of Salvation Army Staff Bands; three in the International Staff Band, one in the Melbourne Staff Band and two in the German Staff Band.

== Bandmasters ==
- 1886 1926 William Thomas
- 1926 1930 Hanbury Thomas
- 1930 1951 Walter Steventon
- 1951 1957 Trevor Steventon
- 1957 1964 Walter Steventon (recommenced)
- 1964 1973 David Alexander
- 1973 1975 George Horrobin
- 1975 1977 Bram White
- 1977 1978 Fred Betts
- 1978 1980 Eric Hallam
- 1980 1991 Brian Cooper
- 1991 2016 Stuart Hall
- 2016 ---- Mark Lazenbury

== Mission ==
As well as assisting in the weekly religious services; both indoor and in the open-air, the Band has travelled throughout the United Kingdom, playing at Christian services and events. The Band has performed in concert halls, worship centres, prisons and hospitals, appeared on film and radio as well as marched through cities, towns and villages proclaiming the good news of God's love for all.

In October 2003 the Band completed its first overseas tour to the Western Cape Division of The Salvation Army in South Africa where they travelled in and around Cape Town. Visiting Robertson, Elilandia, Worcester, Paarl, Stellenbosch, Rondebosch, Goodwood, Mitchell's Plain and Fish Hoek.

The Band also completed a UK tour the "Gospel Train" during May and June 2006 where they travelled the North Scotland Division of The Salvation Army visiting Fort William, Inverness, Wick, Peterhead, Aberdeen, Dundee and Blairgowrie.

In May 2009 the Band travelled to Finland where they performed several concerts in Suolahti, Kiuruvesi as well as Jyväskylä. Sponsored jointly by the Pentecostal and Adventist Churches as well as the local Salvation Army, the band captivated large audiences in each of their concerts with a programme of classical and sacred music including work from the Finnish composer Sibelius.

== Recordings ==
The Band released its first CD "Gospel Train" for the 2006 tour to North Scotland. The track list is:

1. Make the world with music ring (Himes)
2. People need the Lord (Davies)
3. A London Celebration (Graham)
4. Gift for His altar (Condon)
5. How great thou art (Wood)
6. Gospel Train (Gott)
7. All to Jesus (Herikstad)
8. Aria From Magic Flute (Mozart)
9. Piano Sonata in C Minor (Beethoven)
10. And they were heroes (Cheyne)
11. Benediction (Brahms)
12. To Regions Fair (Bearcroft)

In March 2007 the Band produced a short promotion CD featuring the music of Raymond Edmund John Cuell who has had a very long association with the Maidenhead. The CD also features a piece arranged by BM Stuart Hall that was dedicated to Maidenhead Bandsman John Mattingley and his family who emigrated to Canada in May 2006. The CD was recorded live.

1. Scarborough Citadel (Cuell)
2. Field Service (Cuell)
3. Haera Ra (Hall)

The most recent CD recording is "Faith Victorious" which was released in time for the Band's Tour to Finland. The track list is:

1. Dance like David (Mackereth)
2. What a friend (Leidzen)
3. Blessing & Honour (Sharman)
4. Give me Jesus (Burgmayer)
5. Yarmouth Fair (Warlock)
6. In perfect peace (Downie)
7. Faith is the Victory (Curnow)
8. Piano Sonata in C minor (Beethoven)
9. Shalom (Silfverberg)
10. A Rose there bloomed (Redhead)
11. Amazing Grace (Trad)
12. Faithfulness (Himes)
13. On the King's Highway (Leidzen)
14. Hymn Tune Finlandia

== See also ==
- Salvation Army Band
- The Salvation Army
- Household Troops Band
- International Staff Band
- Chalk Farm Salvation Army Band
- Brass Band
- Melbourne Staff Band
- Parramatta Citadel Band
- Sydney Youth Band
