= Frank Bell (Salvation Army officer) =

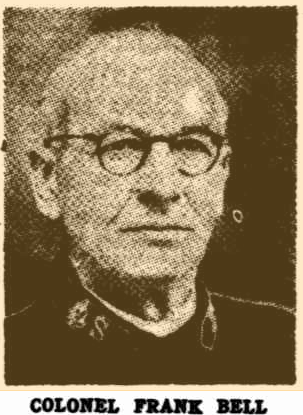
- Born: c. 1869
- Died: 4 April 1957 (aged 87–88)
- Military career
- Rank: Colonel

Frank Bell (c. 1869 – 4 April 1957) was a colonel in the Salvation Army. From 1920, he and his wife served in Australia as principals of the organisation's training garrisons in Melbourne and Sydney. He was known as a strong personality and a forceful and earnest speaker.

== History ==
No details have been found regarding his origin and first 20 years with the Salvation Army.

Around 1910 he became associated with the training of cadets for service as Salvation Army officers, first with the International Training Garrison in London, England, then as principal of the Toronto, Canada, garrison. After the Great War of 1814–1918, when the Salvation Army organisation was held in stasis, Bramwell Booth made a tour of global Salvation Army operations, and ordered numerous changes to its upper ranks to advance his vision of a cohesive organisation. In October 1920 Commissioner James Hay (1865–1962) announced changes to its Territorial Division, which included Australia, breaking its command into two rival divisions under commissioners of similar ranking: Colonel Ernest Knight of the Melbourne Training College becoming chief secretary for the eastern territory, based in Sydney, (Note: Knight retired and was replaced in 1923 by John McInnes, whose non-appearance is unexplained; Walter Suttor (died 1949) in 1924 and George Carpenter in 1927.) and Commissioner William J. Richards in charge of the southern territory, based in Melbourne. Similar upheavals were imposed on the US organisation.

Bell, ranked lieutenant-colonel, succeeded Knight as colonel in charge of the Melbourne training college, and Lieutenant-Colonel Alfred J. S. Harris, of the Adelaide garrison, was appointed to a new training College in Sydney, due to be opened in March 1921. In 1926 he was transferred to the Sydney training college, while Harris was transferred to Melbourne. No explanation was given for this exchange of responsibilities. Harris was replaced by Bettridge in 1929.

He became a "radio star" in 1929 when 2BL began regularly broadcasting the Sunday services he conducted at the Congress Hall, Elizabeth Street, Sydney. In 1931 he wrote an article on the international nature of the Army for the Daily Telegraph, one in a series for "Church Week". He returned to the topic in 1934, with the impending retirement of Edward J. Higgins.

He was said to have a strong personality and was said to be a forceful and earnest speaker. The night service has been ranged as a special civic service and invitations to attend have been accepted by the mayors and aldermen of Newcastle, Wickham, Stockton, and Carrington. The programme of meetings includes a special lecture on the "Army Founder" tonight, meetings at 11, 3.15, and 7 tomorrow, and a special gathering for Salvationists on Monday night.

He was an enthusiast for the Council of Churches as a pressure group combating social ills — he was concerned with the insidious erosion of Sunday by innocent pleasures — picnics and bushwalking, concerts and, worst of all, the family motor car. The Council had some success fighting Sunday dancing and organised sports. In 1938 he was elected president of the Council of Churches in New South Wales.

== Other interests ==
- Bell conducted Bible classes.
- Bell believed in the healing power of prayer, having himself overcome an (undisclosed) complaint said to be incurable.
- Was he the Frank Bell who photographed The wreck of the Euroka on Long Reef.

== Publications ==
In 1942 he published a booklet collection of his sermons. Other publications include:

- 1939 The international imbroglio : is it judgment?
- 1942 Shadow of catastrophe : France's fateful example
- 1942 Rendezvous with destiny
- 1947 The world's malady diagnosed and the shape of things to come

== Family ==
Bell married Miriam (c. 1866 (Note: Bell was due to retire in 1933 at age 65.) – 15 July 1944). They had one son and four daughters, all Salvation Army officers:

- C. Mabel Bell
- Kathleen Bell married Captain, later Brigadier, George H. C. Garlick on 28 December 1927. Both were lifelong Salvationists
- Herbert Bell
- Mildred Bell (c. 1900 – 4 or 5 July 1933) was their youngest daughter.
