= Kenneth Downie =

British composer

Kenneth Downie is a composer of brass band music.

He was born in Glasgow in 1946 and educated at Greenock High School, the Royal Manchester College of Music and Durham University. He then became a specialist music teacher in schools before leaving his position as Head of Music at Poole Grammar School to go into the jewellery business in 1976.

== Music ==
His published compositions, now numbering over 50, span a period of 30 years and are mainly for brass band or choir. Recent commissions include music for the Hampshire County Youth Band, City of Winchester Brass, International Staff Band of The Salvation Army and the Swiss and Norwegian National Brass Band Championships. In 1998 and 2000 his 'Purcell Variations' and 'Music for the Common Man' were chosen as section one regional test pieces for the National Brass Band Championships. 'Music for the Common Man' was also the test piece for the first section in the National Mineworkers' Contest in 2007

In April 1998 he was appointed to the post of Composer in Residence to the Yorkshire Building Society Band, and thus began a fruitful relationship involving concerts, broadcasts and recordings.

In November 1999 his contribution to Salvation Army music was recognised by the New York Staff Band when he was invited to be the guest at their annual Profile Night.

In July 2001 Kenneth was appointed as 'creative consultant' to the Salvation Army's Music Ministries department in London with special responsibility for the nurture of promising young composers.

In September 2001 a tribute CD from Brighouse and Rastrick Brass Band was released on the Egon label. Using music drawn from Salvation Army and contesting band repertoire, the CD is conducted by David Hirst and Stephen Cobb.

In June 2003 a choral work for mixed voices `Veni Emmanuel` was premiered by the International Staff Songsters of the Salvation Army at the Royal Albert Hall, London.

Kenneth Downie was selected to write the test piece for the Championship Section of the European Brass Band Championships, which was held in Glasgow in April 2004. The work is called St Magnus and is a set of variations on that tune. St Magnus was also selected in 2008 as the North American Brass Band Championships test piece.

In April 2006, a further tribute CD from The International Staff Band of The Salvation Army was released, this time on the SP&S label. The CD, called St Magnus, includes the first studio recording of that music which was the test piece for the Championship Section of the 2004 European Brass Band Championships.

In May 2007, it was announced that Kenneth Downie had been commissioned and had written the test piece for the 2007 British Open Brass Band Championship. 'Visions of Gerontius' is based on the hymn tune Gerontius of John Bacchus Dykes.

He was commissioned to write a new piece for the Elite Section in the Swedish Brass Band Festival of 2008. The piece is called 'Swedish Festival Music' and was premiered at SBBF in November 2008. As he was the "guest of honour" at the festival, all the other sections used his works as well.

He lives in Devon with his wife Patricia, who is also a musician, teaching pianoforte and singing. They are both active lay-Salvationists.

Kantaramusik is his own publishing company which concerns itself only with his own compositions. Kantaramusik publications are distributed exclusively by Salvation Army Trading Company Limited through its trading brand World of Brass.
