= Frank Bell =

Frank Bell may refer to:

- Frank Bell (RAF airman) (1897–1960), World War I flying ace
- Frank Bell (baseball) (1863–1891), Major League Baseball player in 1885 for the Brooklyn Grays
- Frank Bell (educator) (1916–1989), British ex-POW, educator and founder of the Bell Educational Trust
- Frank Bell (governor) (1840–1927), governor of Nevada, 1890–1891
- Frank Bell (radio pioneer) (1896–1987), New Zealand radio pioneer; nephew of Francis Bell (New Zealand politician)
- Frank Bell (Salvation Army officer) (1869–1957), instructor in London, Toronto, Melbourne, Sydney
- Frank J. Bell (1885–1957), American doctor and aviator
- Frank T. Bell (1883–1970), U.S. Commissioner of Fish and Fisheries (1933–1939)
- Frank McKelvey Bell, Canadian soldier and author

== See also ==
- Francis Bell (disambiguation)
- J. Franklin Bell (1856–1919), officer in the United States Army
