= SYB =

SYB is a three-letter acronym which can refer to

- A three letter code for Stalybridge railway station
- The Statesman's Yearbook
- Sydney Youth Band, a Salvation Army Brass Band for those aged 13–30.
