= Chalk Farm (disambiguation) =

Chalk Farm is an area of London.

Chalk Farm may also refer to:

- Chalk Farm Road, a street in the Camden Town area of London
- Chalk Farm Salvation Army Band, a brass band from London
- Chalk FarM (band), an alternative band from Los Angeles
- Chalk Farm tube station, a tube station in London, England
