= Chalk Farm Salvation Army Band =

English brass band

The Chalk Farm Band is brass band of the Salvation Army located at the Salvation Army Centre in Haverstock Hill, Chalk Farm, London, England. It is one of the best known brass bands of the Salvation Army in the UK.

== Brief history ==
Chalk Farm Band has always been at the forefront of Salvation Army banding.

Indeed, as early as 1898, just sixteen years after its formation in 1882, it was first featured as the solo band for a Salvation Army International Congress. The venue was London's Crystal Palace and the band was led by a youthful A W Punchard. This notable achievement proved to be a prelude to far greater accomplishments, for during the next fifty years, Bandmaster Punchard led the band in many pioneering developments that influenced the life and growth of Salvation Army bands worldwide. Particularly notable were the trail-blazing overseas tours over thirty of which have been completed to date.

During the 1930s, the band's progress became a model to be emulated by music sections throughout the world, no doubt as a result of extensive touring of Scandinavia and Central Europe. AWP was also regarded as the model bandmaster and was appointed National Bandmaster in 1922, a position he held until his Promotion to Glory in 1950.

Innovative ventures were being undertaken at home. The first of many gramophone recordings was made as early as 1912, for Pathe Frere, and the band's first radio broadcast was transmitted in 1924. Formal recognition of the band's consistently high standard of service came in 1934 when it was received by King George V at Buckingham Palace, London.

Bandmaster Punchard's eventual retirement in 1944 coincided with the gradual return of many of the band's servicemen from World War II. The rebuilding task passed to Frank Rawbone who greatly enhanced the technical skill and tonal qualities of the band. This enabled a tour of Sweden to be undertaken in 1948, the first extensive post war overseas campaign by a Salvation Army band.

Progress continued in subsequent years and under the baton of Stuart Parker, a further European Tour was undertaken in 1961.

Michael Clack assumed the leadership of the band in 1963 and directed the band for most of the succeeding years until his retirement in 2001. Under Michael's leadership, the band continued to travel extensively in the UK and beyond, developing ever more innovative methods of ministry. During the historic four-country tour of Europe in 1967, Rome was visited for the first time and an invitation was accepted to play before Pope Paul VI at the Vatican – at that time a highly controversial decision but now this event is recorded for posterity in the History of The Salvation Army Vol VII.

It was a different Germany that received the band in October 1985 than on the occasion fifty years earlier when Nazi salutes and Swastika flags accompanied the band on its way through Essen, Hamburg and Berlin.

In 1986, the band accepted an invitation from the Spain and Portugal Command to assist in its first ever Congress. In spite of much local opposition the band was privileged to hold an open-air service and march of witness in the Plaza Mayor, Madrid – yet again the first Salvation Army section to undertake such a venture.

1988 saw the band undertake its first tour outside Europe when it undertook an extensive tour of Australia in the country's Bi-Centennial year. Less than 24 hours after landing on Australian soil, the band played its first festival in Adelaide, later travelling to Tasmania, Melbourne, Canberra, Wollongong, Newcastle and Sydney where a capacity audience greeted the band for its final major concert at the Sydney Conservatorium of Music.

Since that ground-breaking tour, other countries visited by the band include Sweden in 1991, the Netherlands and Germany in 1995, and Denmark and Switzerland in 1997. In the following year, the band accepted an invitation from the Russian Command Headquarters in Moscow to travel to Tbilisi, Georgia to assist with that Territory's first ever Congress just five years after the Salvation Army's work recommenced in the former Soviet Union following the collapse of Communism.

Just two years later, the band's pioneering spirit saw it travelling again, this time to Japan to participate in high-profile events including the mammoth Midosuji Parade in Osaka. Despite encountering an earthquake on its first day in Japan, the band was not to be deterred and played to enthusiastic crowds, including over 1 million people on the streets of Osaka for the major parade that was the centre piece of this tour, an event captured live on Japanese television. The band was honoured to play at the Heian Shrine in historic Kyoto before returning to London having broken new ground for The Salvation Army in the Far East.

Under Michael Clack's leadership the band had reached new heights and broken new ground across the world. Michael was awarded the MBE by Queen Elizabeth II in 1995 for services to Music Education, an honour richly deserved.

In 2001, Michael retired and handed the baton to Jonathan Evans. Since that time, the band has continued its tradition of taking the Gospel to the world with further tours undertaken in Norway, Finland and Estonia. During the latter visit, the band was again involved in pioneering work, assisting with the opening of a new Corps at Tartu on the Estonia/Russia border. Family commitments have taken Jonathan away from Chalk Farm, and Michael Clack has since 'taken up the baton' once again.

As well as its overseas engagements, the band continues its work in the UK, visiting Corps across the UK territory. It also maintains a local ministry in North London. The band has longstanding links with the church of St Martin-in-the-Fields, Trafalgar Square, and regularly participates in events in Central London.

Over the years the band has been very active in the British broadcasting media having appeared for many years on BBC's Blue Peter programme as well as making regular appearances on Songs of Praise and BBC Radio's Gloria Hunniford programme, all of which carried its ministry to millions.

Demands for the band services remains high and the current band continues to be fully committed to maintaining and developing the highest standards of Salvation Army banding.

== Mission ==
The Band's primary function is to participate fully in the weekly religious services, both indoor and in the open-air. In addition it regularly presents concerts at other Salvation Army corps both in the UK and abroad. The Band has appeared annually on the BBC TV Show Blue Peter throughout most of its record 50-year run, and has also made a number of appearances on Songs of Praise at the Royal Albert Hall and on BBC Radio shows such as Gloria Hunniford and Owen Spencer-Thomas's Sounding Brass and Listen to the Band.

== Make-Up ==
All of the band's members are amateur players, and members of the Salvation Army. Despite having earlier feature other instruments, the band now features the standard brass band instrumentation being:

- 8 cornets
- 2 tenor horns
- 1 baritone horn
- 2 trombones
- 2 euphoniums
- 2 tubas
- 1 percussion

== Recordings ==
The band has released 5 CDs (the most recent being Emblem of the Army), 6 records, and also appeared on a number of 78s. A video detailing its history is also available, which is entitled Blood & Fire & Brass – Blood & Fire being a feature of the Salvation Army flag.

== Tours ==
The band has travelled extensively, as the 'Battle Honours' on the Band flag records.

- 1902 Scotland
- 1903 South West England
- 1905 Netherlands
- 1907 Netherlands & Germany
- 1909 Ireland
- 1911 Midlands, Yorkshire & Eastern Counties
- 1913 West England & South Wales
- 1920 Denmark & Sweden
- 1924 Northern England & Scotland
- 1927 Switzerland & Germany
- 1930 Norway & Sweden
- 1934 Denmark, Sweden & Finland
- 1936 Czechoslovakia, Austria & Central Europe
- 1948 Sweden
- 1961 France and Switzerland
- 1967 Europe including Italy & Vatican City
- 1969 North Wales (for an Investiture with HRH Prince of Wales)
- 1981 Switzerland
- 1985 Isle of Man
- 1985 Germany
- 1986 Spain
- 1988 Australia
- 1989 Northern Ireland
- 1991 Sweden
- 1996 Netherlands & Germany
- 1997 Denmark
- 1997 Switzerland
- 1998 Georgia
- 2000 Japan
- 2003 Norway
- 2005 Finland & Estonia
- 2007 South West England

== See also ==
- The Salvation Army
- Household Troops Band
- International Staff Band
- Maidenhead Citadel Band
- Parramatta Citadel Band
