= International Staff Songsters =

Principal choir of the Salvation Army

International Staff Songsters (ISS)
- Choir
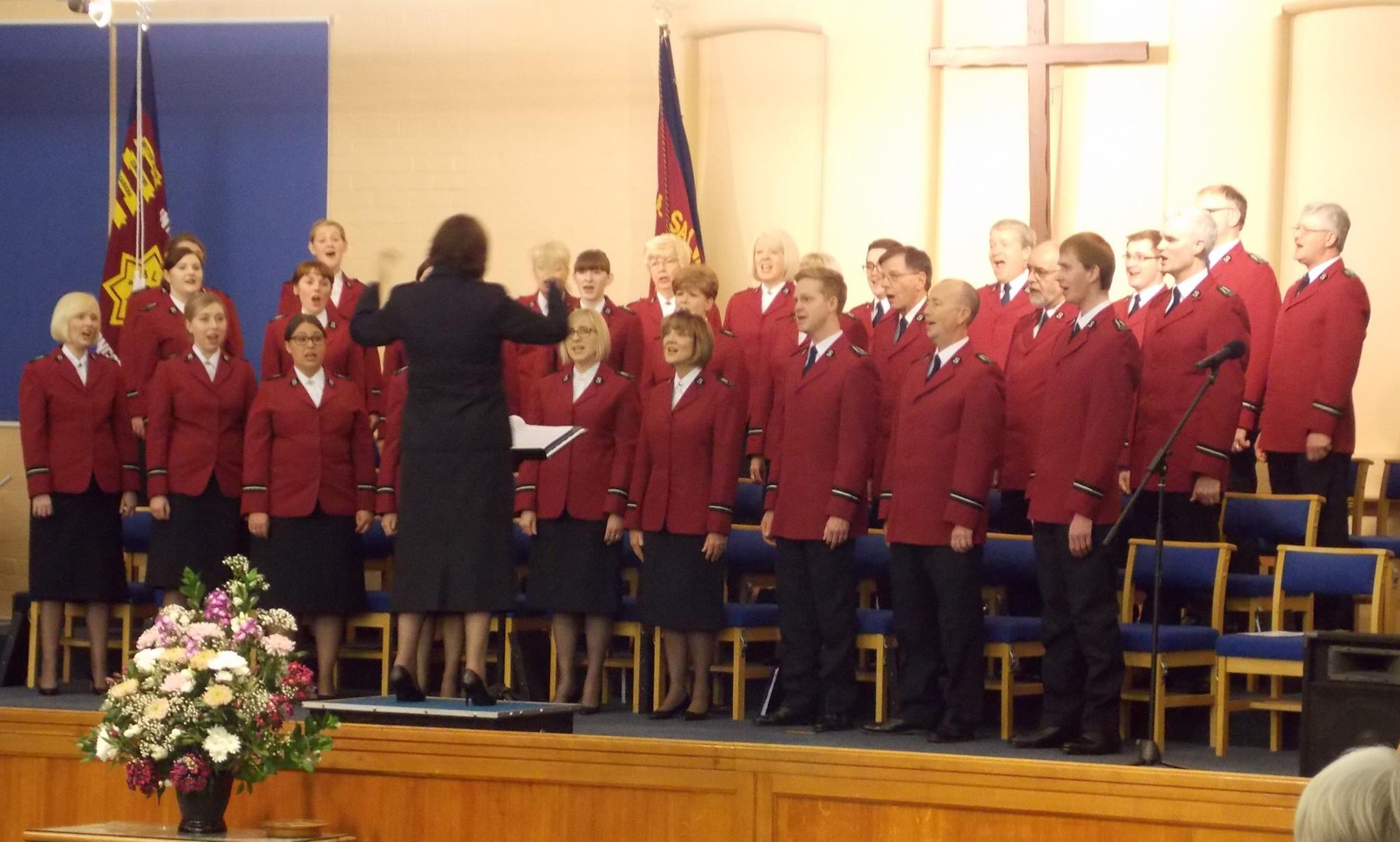
- Origin: London, United Kingdom
- Founded: 1897–1928 1980–present
- Genre: Christian; choral
- Music director: Dorothy Nancekievill
- Affiliation: The Salvation Army
- Label: SP&S
- Website: www.salvationarmy.org.uk/international-staff-songsters

"Amazing God!" (Lee Fisher)
Audio sample of the ISS from the album Blessings (2022)

The International Staff Songsters (ISS) is the principal choir of the Salvation Army. Based in London, UK, the group performs Christian choral music in concerts, worship services and television and radio broadcasts, and has recorded more than 50 albums since its inauguration.

Members of the choir are Christians who are also members of their local Salvation Army church. The ISS regularly visits Salvation Army centres in the UK and has undertaken several international tours, including Europe, North and South America, Africa, and Australasia. Profits from recordings and performances are used to support the work of the Salvation Army. The ISS has performed in diverse locations; from notable concert venues including the Royal Albert Hall, O2 Arena, Roy Thompson Hall, the Hollywood Bowl, and Symphony Hall, to squatter camps, prisons, and homeless shelters. The ISS regularly performs on the long-running BBC Radio 4 shows The Daily Service and Sunday Worship, and has also featured on the BBC Television programme, Songs of Praise.

== Structure and purpose ==
The ISS is a mixed-voice (SATB) choir of approximately 30 singers, typically accompanied by a pianist, bassist, and percussionist. The ISS describes its purpose as to support the work of the Salvation Army and to communicate the organisation's Christian beliefs through its music, often by performing works with lyrics quoting or paraphrasing scripture. The ISS website states:

We believe passionately in the power of music and singing to share God’s love and to bring people and communities together. [...] Wherever we go, we strive to introduce people to Jesus and His power to change lives. [...] We also enjoy meeting and sharing with local singers when we lead vocal workshops in a variety of community settings.

In addition to a musical director, the ISS is led by an Executive Officer; an ordained Salvation Army Officer who serves as the spiritual and pastoral leader of the group.

== History ==
=== 1897–1928 ===
The ISS was formally established in March 1897 by an official minute issued by Bramwell Booth, the Salvation Army's Chief of the Staff. Although the group had been functioning unofficially since 1892, this marked its official recognition as the Salvation Army's first authorised choir, preceding the formation of the first local songster brigade in Penge by a year. Prior to this, several unofficial Salvation Army choirs had already begun to emerge across England and Scotland in the early 1890s. The ISS was composed of staff of the organisation's International Headquarters (IHQ) in London (from which the ISS derives its name) and the chief of the accounts department, Herbert Jackson, was appointed the first leader.

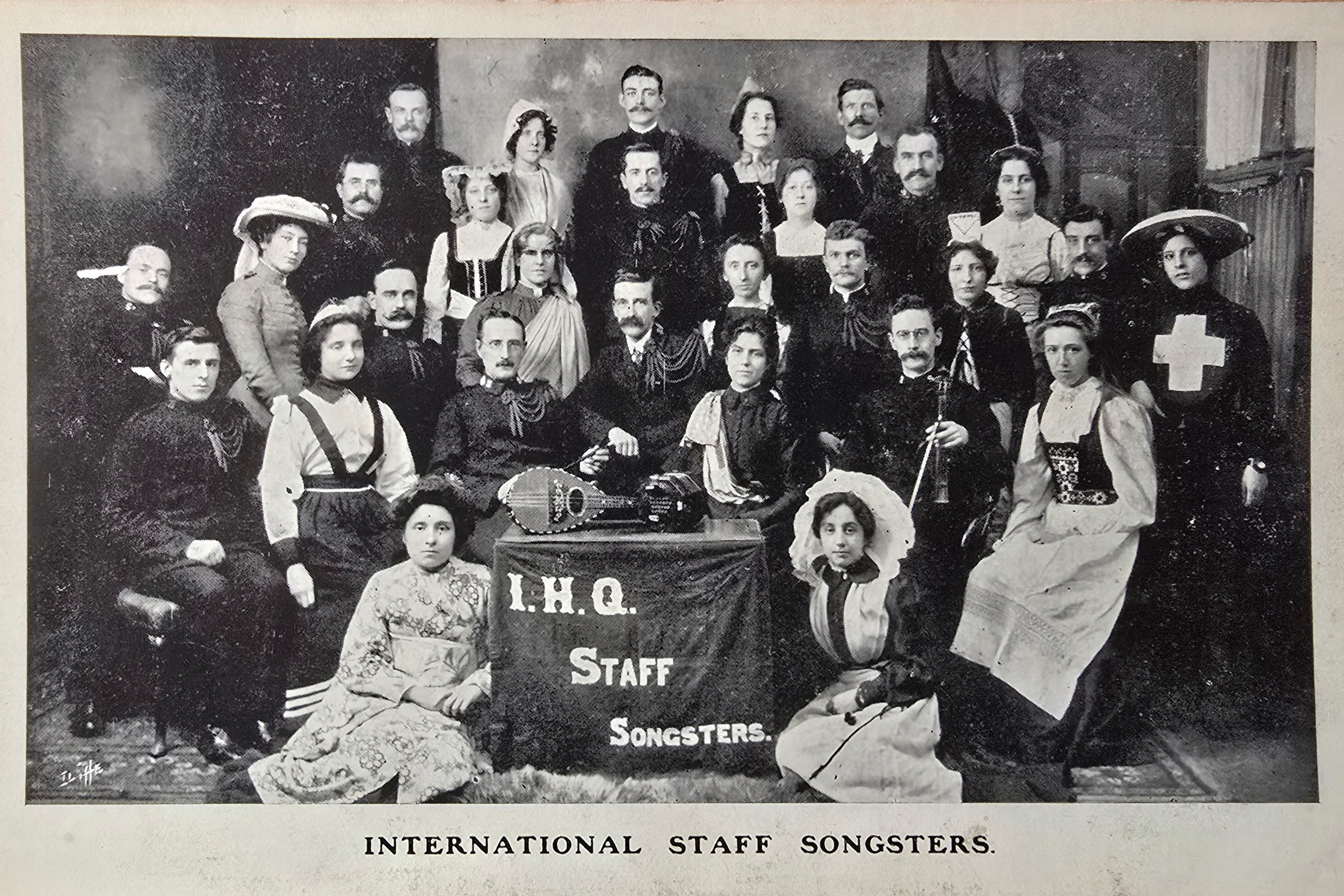
Postcard showing the International Staff Songsters around the time of the 1904 International Congress in London

Undertaking 'campaigns' on weeknights and every third weekend, by 1912 it was reported that the ISS had travelled 25,000 miles and sung to audiences totalling more than one million people. The ISS also attracted the attention of high-profile music critics, including George Bernard Shaw. In 1922, Jackson was succeeded by his deputy, Railton Howard, before the group was abruptly disbanded in 1928 due to "members' conflict of duties" with their headquarters roles. Despite also comprising headquarters employees, the International Staff Band was permitted to continue.

=== 1980–present ===
After a 52-year hiatus, the group was re-formed in March 1980 by General Arnold Brown who appointed Norman Bearcroft as the founding leader of the relaunched group. Although membership was no longer confined to International Headquarters staff, the original name was retained. On the decision to re-form the group, General Brown commented:

All aspects of the proposal were carefully weighed by Army leaders before the decision was taken. Many recall the effectiveness of earlier, similar groups, and the necessity for another such music section has been seen for some years [...] The purpose will be the same as that of every musical aggregation throughout the Army world – the proclaiming of the message of salvation. It is hoped that the brigade will do it in such a way as to merit the emulation of songsters everywhere.

An inaugural concert took place at the Fairfield Halls, Croydon on 8th March 1980, following which Norman Bearcroft led the ISS for 12 years. The group has subsequently had a further four leaders: Len Ballantine (1992–1998), Peter Ayling (1998–2001), Andrew Blyth (2001–2003), and Dorothy Nancekievill (2003–present).

The ISS has performed at the Royal Albert Hall more than 60 times and remains a perennial performer at the Hall for Celebrating Christmas with the Salvation Army, which is frequently broadcast on BBC Radio. In 2020, the 40th anniversary of the current ISS was marked by a concert with the London Mozart Players hosted by Welsh broadcaster Aled Jones and a special feature on BBC One's Songs of Praise in which JB Gill interviewed current members. In October 2021, the ISS took part in a special service on BBC Radio 4 to commemorate World Mental Health Day.

== Discography ==
The ISS has released a number of recordings, including some collaborations with notable brass bands, including the International Staff Band, Household Troops Band and Cory Band. Most of the group's recordings are produced and distributed by SP&S, although compilation albums featuring the music of the ISS have also been produced by Metro and Hallmark Records. In 1988, the ISS performed much of the soundtrack of the Anglia Television series Marching as to War with Roy Castle.

Date	Leader	Discography
1897–1922	Herbert Jackson	–
1922–1928	Railton Howard	–
1980–1992	Norman Bearcroft	Introducing... the International Staff Songsters (1980)
1980–1992	Norman Bearcroft	So This Is It...My Day For Living (1981)
1980–1992	Norman Bearcroft	All God's Creatures Sing (1983)
1980–1992	Norman Bearcroft	Be Of Good Cheer (1985)
1980–1992	Norman Bearcroft	On Reflection (1986)
1980–1992	Norman Bearcroft	Christmas Greetings (1987)
1980–1992	Norman Bearcroft	The Spirit of the Army (1988)
1980–1992	Norman Bearcroft	The International Staff Songsters of The Salvation Army (1988)
1980–1992	Norman Bearcroft	Alleluia (1989)
1980–1992	Norman Bearcroft	Unto the Lord (1991)
1980–1992	Norman Bearcroft	The Power and the Glory (1991)
1992–1998	Len Ballantine	Let It Shine (1993)
1992–1998	Len Ballantine	Moment By Moment (1994)
1992–1998	Len Ballantine	More than Wonderful (1995)
1992–1998	Len Ballantine	Sing for Joy (1996)
1992–1998	Len Ballantine	Let The Morning Bring... (1997)
1992–1998	Len Ballantine	Sing Noel (1997)
1992–1998	Len Ballantine	If... Then (1998)
1998–2001	Peter Ayling	Distant Shores (1999)
1998–2001	Peter Ayling	In The Army (2000)
2001–2003	Andrew Blyth	In This Quiet Moment (2002)
2001–2003	Andrew Blyth	Until The End Of Time (2002)
2001–2003	Andrew Blyth	Total Praise! (2003)
2003–present	Dorothy Nancekievill	Rest (2003)
2003–present	Dorothy Nancekievill	A Greater Wonder (2004)
2003–present	Dorothy Nancekievill	The Gift (2005)
2003–present	Dorothy Nancekievill	Grace Alone (2005)
2003–present	Dorothy Nancekievill	Freedom (2006)
2003–present	Dorothy Nancekievill	Praise His Name (2007)
2003–present	Dorothy Nancekievill	Introit (2008)
2003–present	Dorothy Nancekievill	Know My Heart (2009)
2003–present	Dorothy Nancekievill	Heart Songs (2010)
2003–present	Dorothy Nancekievill	The Power (2011)
2003–present	Dorothy Nancekievill	In The Name of the Lord (2012)
2003–present	Dorothy Nancekievill	Heart Songs Volume II (2013)
2003–present	Dorothy Nancekievill	Sing to the Lord – 20th Anniversary (2013)
2003–present	Dorothy Nancekievill	Good News! (2014)
2003–present	Dorothy Nancekievill	A Choral Symphony (2015)
2003–present	Dorothy Nancekievill	My Lord Has Come (2016)
2003–present	Dorothy Nancekievill	Compelled by Love (2016)
2003–present	Dorothy Nancekievill	Anastasis (2017)
2003–present	Dorothy Nancekievill	A Gowans Legacy (2018)
2003–present	Dorothy Nancekievill	When Love was Born (2018)
2003–present	Dorothy Nancekievill	A Gowans Legacy Volume II (2019)
2003–present	Dorothy Nancekievill	Make a Joyful Noise! (2019)
2003–present	Dorothy Nancekievill	Rejoice in the Lord and Sing! (2020)
2003–present	Dorothy Nancekievill	Symphony (2020)
2003–present	Dorothy Nancekievill	Blessings (2022)
2003–present	Dorothy Nancekievill	Lord, You are the Song (2023)
2003–present	Dorothy Nancekievill	Alpha & Omega (2024)
2003–present	Dorothy Nancekievill	God of the Deep (2025)
2003–present	Dorothy Nancekievill	New Creation (2026)

== Associated groups ==
Founded in 1891, the International Staff Band (ISB) is the premier brass band of the Salvation Army. Also based in London, the ISB regularly performs with the ISS at Salvation Army events in the UK.

Between 1960 and 1968, a Salvation Army female vocal group called the National Songsters operated in London.

The ISS has served as a model for the establishment of other 'Staff Songsters' which fulfil a similar function to the ISS and represent the Salvation Army in various countries, territories, and cities around the world:

Staff Songsters	Location	Date established
Amsterdam Staff Songsters	Amsterdam, Netherlands	1956
Melbourne Staff Songsters	Melbourne, Australia	1987
Sydney Staff Songsters	Sydney, Australia	1989
India Eastern Territorial Staff Songsters	Aizawl, India	2005
Japan Staff Songsters	Tokyo, Japan	2010
Western Territory Staff Songsters	Los Angeles, United States	2012
Canadian Staff Songsters	Toronto, Canada	2016
Eastern Territory Staff Songsters	New York, United States	2018
Central Territorial Staff Songsters	Chicago, United States	2020
Southern Staff Songsters	Atlanta, United States	2022
