= Minnie Lindsay Carpenter =

Australian Salvation Army officer and author

- Born: Minnie Lindsay Rowell; Disputed: 1873 or 1874; Disputed: Bombria, Australia or Bridgenorth, England
- Died: 23 November 1960
- Occupation: Author

Minnie Lindsay Carpenter (12 December 1873 – 23 November 1960), née Rowell, was an Australian writer and an officer in The Salvation Army in Australia. She authored more than twelve books about Salvationist history. She also helped establish the Salvation Army International Nursing Fellowship and served as World President of the Home League. She married George Lyndon Carpenter, a Salvationist who was later elected as the fifth General of the Salvation Army in 1939.

== Personal life ==
Minnie Lindsay Rowell's date and place of birth are recorded differently in different sources. According to the Australian Dictionary of Biography, she was born on 12 December 1873 in Bombira, near Mudgee, New South Wales, Australia, the daughter and fifth child of Nicholas and Sarah Rowell. The Historical Dictionary of the Salvation Army states that Minnie was born in 1874 in Bridgenorth, Shropshire, England, and that her father was a farmer who died when she was a child. Her mother, Sarah Rowell, worked as a teacher; after her husband's death, she emigrated to Australia, settling in Mudgee, New South Wales. She joined The Salvation Army, which had only been established in Australia a few years earlier, in 1880, and was growing quickly.

Minnie Rowell became a Salvation Army officer, and dedicated her life to working for the Salvos, as they are affectionately known in Australia. While working for the Salvation Army's publishing house in Melbourne, she met George Lyndon Carpenter. At the time, Carpenter was the editor of The War Cry, the primary magazine of the Salvation Army. The couple married on 21 June 1899. They were married in Melbourne by Herbert Booth, the son of William and Catherine Booth, co-founders of The Salvation Army. Minnie Carpenter gave birth to her first child, Stella in 1901. The couple had a second daughter, Irene, in 1904; a few years later, their third child and only son, George, was born in 1908.

Stella went on to author a biography of her father, entitled Man of Peace, that was published in 1993. She and George Carpenter survived their parents.

== The Salvation Army ==
Raised in The Salvation Army as a child, Minnie chose to make Christian ministry her profession. She attended the Salvation Army training college in Melbourne in 1892, and became an officer in 1893. The Salvation Army allows both women and men to become officers, which is a full-time ministry role similar to that of ordained clergy in other Christian denominations. Training is required before one can be commissioned, which is the equivalent of ordination.

After her commissioning, Rowell was assigned to a corp in Victoria for a short while, before being sent to Western Australia. She became the Corps Officer of the Perth corps, the Salvation Army term for a local congregation, and served in that capacity from 1893 to 1896. She was then transferred back to Melbourne, where she joined the editorial staff of The Salvation Army headquarters. Having earned the rank of Ensign, she edited The Young Soldier, a publication oriented toward youth in the Salvation Army. While working, she met and then married George Carpenter, a fellow Salvationist writer and editor.

In 1911, the Carpenters moved to London, England, where George Carpenter was assigned the role of personal assistant to the General of The Salvation Army, Bramwell Booth. Recognized for her writing and editing skills, Minnie Carpenter was appointed assistant editor of The Officer, a Salvation Army publication. She began writing books about Salvationist history as well. In 1921, she completed a biography of Kate Lee, entitled The Angel Adjutant, which became one of her most well-known books. She also published Women of the Flag, God's Battle School, Commissioner John Lawley, and Miriam Booth.

The Carpenters returned to Australia in 1927, when George Carpenter was sent to Sydney to edit the War Cry. The reassignment was seen as a demotion, and came on the order of Booth, who over the years had strained relationships with many of the Salvos leaders. The couple moved frequently in the following years, as George Carpenter was assigned different postings. In 1933, they moved to Buenos Aires, where George Carpenter took up the post of territorial commander for South America, and in 1937, they migrated to Canada. In 1939, George Carpenter was elected the fifth General for the Salvation Army, and they moved back to London. During his tenure as General, the couple travelled frequently, even during the war years.

As the spouse of the General, Minnie Carpenter continued to be a leader in her own right, serving the Salvation Army with her own particular talents. She helped establish the Salvation Army's International Nursing Fellowship in 1943, and served as world president of the Home League. She continued writing books as well, authoring more than 12 books in her lifetime. Her biographies have been recognized for their notable contributions to the historiography of the Salvation Army.

Minnie Carpenter returned to Australia with her husband and daughter in 1946, at the end of her husband's term as General.

== Death and legacy ==
Minnie Carpenter died on 23 November 1960, in Undercliffe, near Sydney, in New South Wales, Australia. Her husband had predeceased her in 1948.

== Works ==
- Miriam Booth
- William Booth
- The Angel Adjutant of "Twice Born Men"
- Commissioner John Lawley
- God's Battle School
- Three Great Hearts
- Notable Officers of the Salvation Army
- Women of the Flag
- In the Land of His Love
