= Hendon Band of The Salvation Army =

Christian brass band

The Hendon Band of The Salvation Army is a non-professional Christian brass band that forms part of the Hendon Corps, a Salvation Army church in Hendon, a suburb of North West London, England. The band was founded in 1885.

== Early years ==
A Salvation Army corps was opened in Hendon in 1882, and its band, consisting of eight members, was formed three years later. Nineteenth century Salvation Army bands were made up entirely of men, and there was no requirement for members to have any particular musical ability. The early bandsmen of Hendon Band were often farmhands or shopkeepers serving the small Hendon community. The role of the band was to assist in worship at the church, and to promote the existence of the newly founded corps through 'open air' services, held outside to attract new worshipers in the district.

By 1914 the Hendon Band was of sufficient quality and strength to carry out weekend 'campaigns', visiting other Salvation Army corps in the United Kingdom, and it is recorded as having been in Gravesend, Kent, when the First World War was declared.

== Development ==
The end of the First World War saw the arrival at Hendon Corps of demobilised soldier Fred H. Cobb. Cobb was appointed Bandmaster in the 1920s and the band began to develop its reputation for high-quality musical performance. Demand for the band increased and weekend campaigns in Boscombe, Plymouth and Exeter were undertaken. In 1936, it undertook its first radio broadcast on Radio Luxembourg. Towards the end of the 1930s an offshoot band, the Young People's Band, was founded to encourage young members of the Hendon Salvation Army to develop their musical abilities. The Young People's Band continued into the 21st century.

In 1950 Fred H. Cobb retired and Don Morrison was appointed Bandmaster. In 1952, the band undertook its first foreign tour in Denmark. Morrison continued in service as Bandmaster for a further five years until he was succeeded by Fred H. Cobb's son, renowned cornet soloist of the Salvation Army's International Staff Band and H. M. Band of the Welsh Guards, Roland Cobb. Under his leadership the band undertook its 1964 tour of the Netherlands, and its 1976 tour of Germany, Switzerland and - again - the Netherlands. In 1978, Hendon Band played the Queen Elizabeth Hall, on London's Southbank, for the first time.

== Maturity ==
1979 saw Roland Cobb's retirement as bandmaster. The band was led for a short period by Paul Ruby before Roland Cobb's eldest son, Dr Stephen Cobb (also bandmaster of the International Staff Band), was appointed as his long-term successor, and under him the band's annual concert at the Queen Elizabeth Hall entitled Hendon Highlights was established in 1985.

In 1988, the band toured Canada and the U.S. for the first time, playing in Toronto, Vancouver, Colorado, San Diego and the length of the West Coast, at venues including the Hollywood Bowl and Disneyworld, as well as churches and a homeless shelter. In 1993, the band returned to America, touring Washington D.C., Baltimore, Richmond, through the Appalachians, to the southern states of Georgia, Alabama and Florida. In 1996, a third visit was completed in which the band played concerts in Minneapolis, Milwaukee, Chicago, St. Louis and Detroit. In the late 1990s, the band appointed its first female members.

In June 2000, Hendon Band took part in an inter-denominational service, marching at the head of the Christian clergy and congregations parading from Westminster Cathedral along Whitehall to Trafalgar Square, and culminating in a further march up The Mall to Buckingham Palace for the performance of a short concert. During the same month, the band represented the Salvation Army's United Kingdom Territory at the International Millennial Congress at Philips Arena, Atlanta, Georgia. The band also travelled to North Carolina to perform with the Asheville Symphony Chorus, and headlined a programme entitled Hendon Highlights USA at Atlanta's Symphony Hall.

In 2002, the band toured Switzerland, and in March 2005, it played a special concert at the Royal Festival Hall, London, to celebrate 21 years of its flagship annual concert, 'Hendon Highlights', with special guests the King's Singers, and established an annual Christmas concert 'A Portrait of Christmas', with special guest Simone Rebello, percussionist. It also toured the West Coast of the U.S. This was followed in 2007 with a tour of Denmark and Sweden, and a 2008 tour of Finland.

Having served as its bandmaster for 29 years, Stephen Cobb relinquished his role as leader of the band in 2009. He was succeeded by David Rudd, a member of the solo cornet section and previous deputy bandmaster, who had also conducted the London Central Fellowship Band of the Salvation Army, as well as Ascot Brass, a non-competing band based in the Maidenhead area. During this time, the band recorded the album 'Cristo Redentor' and undertook a short tour of Finland. The Hendon Highlights of 2011 featured special guests Philip Smith, principal trumpet of the New York Philharmonic Orchestra, and the International Staff Songsters.

Stephen Cobb returned as the band's conductor in 2012.

In the 2010s, the band was noted for its principal cornetist, Philip Cobb, the youngest son of conductor Stephen Cobb, who was appointed principal trumpet of the London Symphony Orchestra, the youngest musician ever to hold this position.

Although the band includes other professional musicians, it still remains an amateur group and its members are mainly students, teachers, businessmen, and civil servants, and other professionals.

In February 2023 the Hendon Band commenced a new chapter as Dr Stephen Cobb passed the baton of leadership to new Bandmaster Jonathan Evans.

== Mission ==
The Hendon Band of the Salvation Army exists to promote the Salvation Army's Christian message, of 'heart to God and hand to man', in Hendon and its immediate area. The band's principal function is to accompany worship at Hendon Salvation Army, London, but over the years, its reputation for high-quality brass band music has led it to be invited to play all over the world, and thus it has taken its message further than many Salvation Army bands are able to. The majority of the music the band plays is Christian, much of it composed especially for Salvation Army brass bands, though its repertoire also includes arrangements of classical and other secular pieces.

== Recordings ==
- Praise!, 1987
- Salvation Song, 1987
- The Inheritors, 1992
- Highlights, 1995
- Pastoral, 1999
- March Past, 2000
- A Life Worth Living, 2000
- Corpus Christi, 2003
- Hear My Prayer feat. David Childs (Euphonium), 2004
- A Walk on the Light Side, 2005
- Christo Redentor, 2010
- A Life Worth Living (Vol. 2), 2014
- Generations, 2014
