= Melbourne Staff Band =

The Melbourne Staff Band (MSB) is the premier brass band of the Salvation Army in Australia.

== History ==
From its beginnings in Adelaide the Salvation Army spread rapidly and soon reached Victoria where the first corps in the state was opened in December 1882 at North Melbourne. By 1890, just 10 years after the first meeting in Adelaide, there were 255 corps and 419 outposts throughout Australia, manned by 747 officers, mostly "home-grown".

As new corps (churches) were opened, bands appeared and proliferated. They not only attracted people to listen to the gospel but also helped to raise funds for the rapidly expanding spiritual and social work of the Army. At that time there was not much entertainment, and music whether good, bad or indifferent soon attracted a crowd.

Early in 1890 it was felt that headquarters in Melbourne should benefit from the services of a band and a small group of officers and employees was brought together under the leadership of Staff Officer Jeremiah Eunson to assist in meetings conducted by Army leaders and to campaign in the area.

The War Cry (Salvation Army Newspaper) of 22 February 1890 reported:

The headquarters band is now an established institution. It is in the charge of Bandmaster Eunson and consists of the following: Major Barritt (Field Secretary), Staff Captain Leigh (Secretary for Trade), Staff Captain Fisher (accountants department), Adjutant Clarkson (trade department), Adjutant Pestell (correspondence), Ensign Stephens (The War Cry), Captain Hungerford (accountants department), Lieutenant Clark (trade department), Comrade Little (engraving), Scribes Sandall and Saunders (Field Secretary's department) and Willie, the messenger.

The musical ability of the group was undoubtedly suspect, none of the players being accomplished or experienced, and in fact some of them were strangers to the mysteries of brass instruments. It is unlikely that their efforts would have gained commendation from musicians, but this was the infant group which grew to maturity and became the Melbourne Staff band.

== Tours ==
Melbourne Staff Band have undertaken many tours since its conception. The Band's first interstate visit was to Adelaide to coincide with the third visit of General William Booth to Australia in 1899. The band travelled to Adelaide by boat. It was reported that "the spirited playing, perfect harmony and brilliant execution of the music are the talk and admiration of the city, and everywhere they have gone the lads have won golden opinions for themselves. The fact that they paid their own fares has also been favourably commented on."

The first overseas trip that the Band made was a 16-day trip to New Zealand in 1959. Since then the Band has toured America, Canada, the United Kingdom, France, Belgium, and Germany.

== The band ==
All the bandsmen and women are members of The Salvation Army and are actively involved in their local Salvation Army Corps, many holding leadership positions within those Corps. The Band is currently under the baton of Bandmaster Mark Hamilton.

== See also ==
- Maidenhead Citadel Band
- Household Troops Band
- International Staff Band
- The Salvation Army
- Brass band (British style)
- Salvation Army Band
- Parramatta Salvation Army
