= Brisbane City Temple Band =

Since its establishment in 1885, The Salvation Army's Brisbane City Temple Corps (No. 2) has used music to convey its gospel message and attract new people to its meetings. At the forefront of this ministry for 130 years has been the Brisbane City Temple Band (or Temple Band). Having toured nationally and internationally as well as performing on ABC Radio, the Temple Band has served its corps, community and city well.

== Purpose ==
As well as aiding worship during Sunday meetings the band plays at Civic functions, hospitals, nursing homes and retirement centres. By arrangement with the Brisbane City Council the Temple Band makes a musical contribution to the city's community life with regular recitals in Brisbane public gardens and parks. In the past the Temple Band has performed at regular engagements with the Australian Broadcasting Commission for nationwide broadcasts and television performances. A feature of the band's activities that has stood the test of time is the Sunday evening open-air meeting in the Queen Street Mall to which a large crowd is regularly attracted.

== Bandmaster lineage ==
Although the Temple Band has a history that reaches back over 100 years, it has only served under the leadership of a handful of bandmasters (or B.M's) throughout its existence including, in the earlier years, B.M's Mick Berghoffer, Percy Gridley and Dave Waugh.

Leonard Baxter was commissioned as a bandsman of the Temple Band in 1924 and took over the leadership of the band in 1932. B.M Baxter held this position for forty-four years, except for a period of war service when the band was in the capable hands of B.M H. Armitage.

His deputy and principal cornetist for almost 20 years John Allen succeeded B/M Baxter in 1977. John had emigrated from UK in 1958 and had previously been the principal cornet of the Wood Green Citadel Band in North London. He was also a member of the Scots Guards Band for three years prior to emigrating to Australia. He resigned from the leadership of the Temple Band in 1985 and with his family moved to reside in Melbourne.

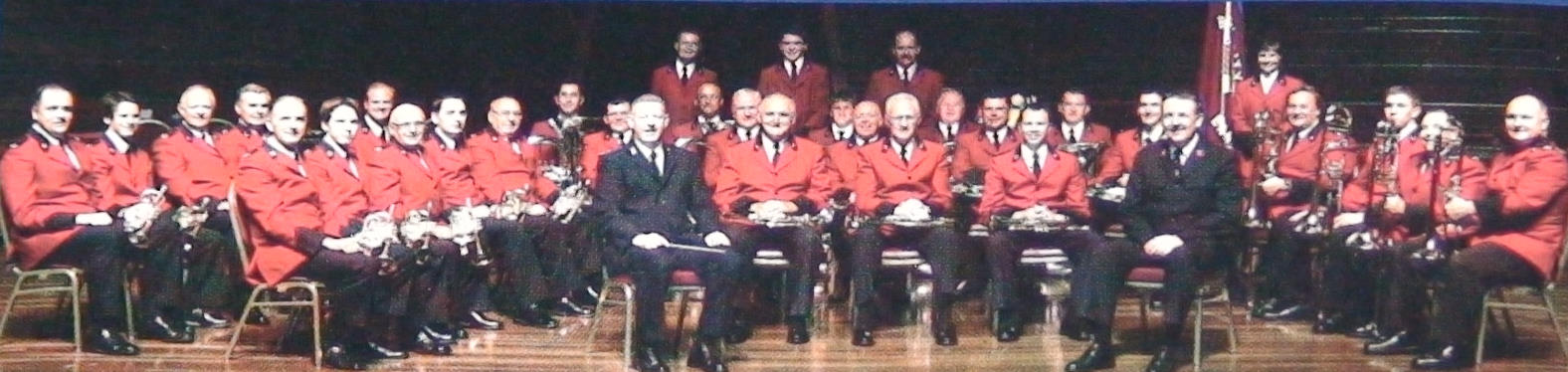
The Temple Band under B.M Stuart Lang in 2007.

B.M Malcolm Carter became Bandmaster after moving residence from Melbourne in 1986. When B.M Carter retired from his position in 1994, B.M Mark Everitt, who had been involved with the Temple band for 15 years, was then handed the baton. He stepped down from his role in 2000, and was replaced by accomplished composer Barrie Gott. Stuart Lang from Wollongong corps was bandmaster from 2007 to April 2014 and lead the band in tours to Sydney and New Zealand.

In 2014 Barrie Gott returned to the podium to lead the band in the celebrations for the Brisbane City Temple's 130th celebrations, for both Sunday services and outreach, as well as a series of events including an Easter weekend with Majors Ron and Donna Millar (Canada), a commemorative concert for Salvationist composer Ray Steadman-Allen with the Brisbane Excelsior Band, and a concert series with musical theatre headliner Silvie Paladino with Melbourne Staff Bandmaster Ken Waterworth.

Tim Green is the current bandmaster, having previously served as a percussionist, concert pianist and trombonist in the band. Commencing at the age of 23, he is the youngest to lead the band. Tim is also actively involved in barbershop and a cappella singing, with his quartet placing first in the Pan Pacific (Sydney, Australia) and third at the international convention (Las Vegas, NV, USA). Under his leadership, the band has conducted concerts with Silvie Paladino, The Idea of North, The Melbourne Staff Band and recently engaged in an innovative worship-culture project entitled Behold with the Factory 412 Worship Team.

== Instrumentation ==
- 1 soprano cornet
- 9 cornets
- 1 flugel horn
- 5 tenor horns
- 4 baritones
- 4 trombones
- 1 bass trombone
- 2 euphoniums
- 5 E♭ and BB♭ basses
- 2 percussion – normally drum kit or timpani

== Personnel ==
This is a list of members who are currently in the band.

Bandmaster
Michael Cooper

Soprano Cornet
Ben McLeod

Cornet
Greg Wilson
Louis Craig
Paul Parkinson
Marshall Strong
Riley Stewart
Jackson Rider
Zachary Lithgow

Flugel Horn
David York

Horn
Matthew Brown
Alan Drury
Maria Adams
Tinash Muza
Bevon Luhrs

Baritone
William Hughes
Gordon Heathcote
Douglas Cooke

Trombone
Ron MacDonald
Rendle Williams

Bass Trombone
Russell Luhrs

Euphonium
Rebekah Cooper
Ron Cox

EE♭ Bass
Graeme Klee
Eric Bailey

BB♭ Bass
Patrick Adams
Warren Murray

Percussion
Sam Creamer

== Tours ==
The Temple Band has toured throughout Queensland, Victoria, New South Wales, the Australian Capital Territory, Western Australia and Tasmania. It has also toured internationally to New Zealand three times and once to Taiwan.

== Concerts and recordings ==
The Temple Band has performed with many other Salvation Army bands, but in recent years it has branched out and performed with secular brass bands, such as Excelsior Brass. The Band released its first recording in 1959, an LP under the 'Fidelity' label. A second LP was produced in 1974. As of 2009, the Temple Band has recorded several Christmas albums and has also released the 1993 album The Gospel Story.

== Membership ==
For some time, to be able to join the band, it was necessary to be enrolled as a Soldier of The Salvation Army. This rule, however, has been relaxed in recent years, but under the premise that the individual is looking to be enrolled at some point in the immediate future. Many people were wary of allowing this to occur, but having seen the impact joining the band has on younger players, soon warmed to it.
