= Francis Bell =

Francis Bell may refer to:

- Arthur Bell (martyr) (1590–1643), also known as Francis Bell, Franciscan and English martyr
- Dillon Bell (Francis Dillon Bell; 1822–1898), New Zealand politician, father of the New Zealand Prime Minister
- Francis Bell (actor) (1944–1994), UK-born New Zealand actor
- Francis Bell (New Zealand politician) (1851–1936), Prime Minister of New Zealand
- Francis Bell (American politician) (1943–2025), South Carolina state senator
- Francis Bell (engineer) (1813–1879), British railway engineer
- Francis Hayley Bell (1877–1944), father of Mary Hayley Bell
- Francis Campbell Bell (1892–1968), politician in Manitoba, Canada
- Francis Jeffrey Bell (1855–1924), English zoologist
- Frank Bell (governor) (Francis Jardine Bell; 1840–1927), sixth Governor of Nevada
- Gordon Bell (surgeon) (Francis Gordon Bell; 1887–1970), New Zealand surgeon and university professor

== See also ==
- Frank Bell (disambiguation)
