= List of Salvation Army corps in the United Kingdom in 1900 =

At the turn of the century in 1900 the Salvation Army in the United Kingdom was well-established, with corps (Salvation Army term for local churches) all over the country. Here is a list of corps in 1900.

A "circle corps" was a corps which was based in a number of villages, and the officer in charge being responsible for a number of centres which ranged from back kitchens and outhouses, to barns and to actual Salvation Army buildings.

A "Battery" was a horse-drawn cart staffed by two single officers, who were in effect mobile evangelists of their day.

== B ==
- Bedlington
- Birkenhead (1,2 and 3)
  - 1 (Central),
  - 2 (Bidston),
  - 3 (Park),
- Birmingham
  - Sparkbrook
- Brighton Battery
- Bristol Battery

Brighton Congress Hall Brighton Edward Street

== C ==
- Cambridge Battery
- Canterbury Battery
- Carmarthen
- Cirencester
- Cornwall Battery

== D ==
- Dalbeattie
- Dalkeith
- Dalston
- Dalton-in-Furness
- Darleston
- Darlington
- Dartford
- Dartmouth
- Darwen
- Daventry
- Dawley
- Dawlish
- Deal
- Deddington
- Denaby
- Denbigh
- Denby Dale
- Denton
- Deptford
- Deptford Slums
- Derby 1,2 and 3
- Derry
- Devizes
- Devon Battery
- Devonport 1 (Devonport Morice Town) and 2 (Devonport Granby Street)
- Dewsbury 1 and 2
- Diss
- Dockhead Slums
- Doncaster
- Dorking
- Dorset Battery
- Douglas
- Dover
- Downham Circle
- Driffield
- Droitwich
- Drury Lane Slums
- Dublin 1,2 and 3
- Dudley
- Dudley Hill
- Dumbarton
- Dumfries
- Dundee 1,2,3 and 4
- Dundee Slums
- Dunfermline
- Dungannon
- Dunoon
- Dunstable
- Durham

== E ==
- Ealing
- Earlestown
- Earls Barton
- Earlston Circle
- Easington Lane
- Easingwold
- Eastbourne
- East Dereham
- East Dulwich
- East Finchley
- East Grinstead
- East Ham
- East Hendred
- Eastleigh
- East Peckham
- East Rudham
- Eastwood
- Eaton Bray
- Ebbw Vale
- Eccles
- Eckington
- Edenbridge
- Edgware
- Edinburgh 1, 2, 3, 4 and 5
- Edinburgh Slums
- Edmonton
- Elgin
- Ely
- Englefield
- Enniskillen
- Eston Mines
- Evesham
- Exeter
- Exmouth

== F ==
- Fakenham
- Falkirk
- Falmouth
- Farcet
- Fareham
- Faringdon
- Farnborough
- Farnworth
- Fauldhouse
- Faversham
- Felixstowe
- Felling
- Feltham
- Fenton
- Fenny Stratford
- Ferndale
- Findochty
- Fintona
- Fishponds
- Fleetwood
- Folkestone
- Fordingbridge
- Forest Gate
- Forest Hill
- Forfar
- Forres
- Framlingham
- Frampton Cotterell
- Fraserburgh
- Freshwater

== G ==
- Gainsborough
- Galashiels
- Garforth
- Gateshead 1,2 and 3
- Gawthorpe
- Gilfach Goch
- Gilford
- Glanamon
- Glasgow 1,2,3,4,5,6,7,8,9,10,11,12,13 and 14
- Glasgow Slums 1 and 2
- Glastonbury
- Glossop
- Gloucester 1 and 2
- Goldsithney
- Good Easter
- Goole
- Gorey
- Gorleston
- Gosport
- Gotham
- Gourdon
- Govan
- Gowerton
- Grand Rocque
- Grangemouth
- Grangetown
- Grantham
- Gravesend
- Grays
- Great Easton
- Great Harwood
- Great Horton
- Great Marlow
- Grecian
- Greenock
- Green Street
- Greenwich
- Grimsby 1 and 2
- Guildford
- Guisborough
- Guiseley
- Gunnislake

== H ==
- Hackney Wick
- Hadleigh Circle
- Haggerston
- Halesworth
- Halesowen
- Halifax 1 and 2
- Halstead
- Hamilton
- Hammersmith
- Hampstead
- Hanley
- Hanwell
- Harborne
- Harefield
- Harlesden
- Harleston
- Harpenden
- Harrington Circle
- Harrogate
- Harrow
- Hartlepool
- Harwich
- Hastings 1,2 and 3
- Hatfield Peverel
- Haverfordwest
- Haverhill
- Hawick
- Haworth
- Hayle
- Haydock
- Hazel Grove
- Healey
- Hebburn
- Heckmondwike
- Hednesford
- Helensboro
- Helston
- Hemel Hempstead
- Hendon
- Henley
- Heolfach
- Hereford
- Herts and Beds Battery
- Hestensetter
- Hetton-le-Hole
- Hexham
- Heywood
- Higham
- High Barnet
- Highbridge
- Higher Ince
- Highgate
- High Wycombe
- Hinckley
- Hirwain
- Histon
- Hitchin
- Hoddesdon
- Hollinwood
- Holloway 1 and 2
- Holt
- Holyhead
- Holywood
- Homerton
- Hoo
- Horbury
- Horsforth
- Horsham
- Horwich
- Houghton Regis
- Houghton-le-Spring
- Hounslow
- Howden
- Howden-on-Tyne
- Hoyland
- Hoyland Common
- Hucknall
- Huddersfield
- Hull 1,2,3,4,5 and 7
- Hunstanton
- Huntingdon
- Hyde
- Hylton
- Hythe

== I ==
- Idle
- Ilfracombe
- Ilkeston
- Innerleithen
- Inverness
- Ipswich 1, 2 and 3
- Ironbridge
- Irthlingborough
- Irvine
- Islington
- Ivinghoe

== J ==
- Jarrow
- Jersey Slums
- Johnstone

== K ==
- Keighley
- Kelsall
- Kelso
- Kendal
- Kenilworth
- Kenmay
- Kennington Lane
- Kensal Rise
- Keswick
- Kettering
- Kidderminster
- Kidsgrove
- Kilbirnie
- Kilburn
- Kilmarnock
- Kilsyth
- Kilwinning
- Kimberley
- King's Cross
- King's Lynn
- Kingston upon Thames
- Kingsbridge
- Kingswood
- Kirkby Folly
- Kirkcaldy 1 and 2
- Kirkintilloch
- Kirkwall
- Knaresborough
- Knottingley

== L ==
- Laisterdyke
- Lamberhead Green
- Lambeth Slums
- Lanark
- Lancaster
- Langholm
- Larkhall
- Lasswade
- La Trinité
- Launceston
- Lavenham
- Leamington Spa
- Leeds 1,2,3,4,5,6,8 and 10
- Leeds Slumbs
- Leek
- Leicester 1,2,3 and 4
- Leigh
- Leighton Buzzard
- Leiston
- Leith
- Leith Slums
- Leominster
- Lerwick
- Leslie
- Lewes
- Lewisham
- Leyton
- Leytonstone
- Ligoniel
- Limavady
- Limehouse
- Lincoln 1 and 2
- Linlithgow
- Linton
- Lisburn
- Liskeard
- Litcham
- Littleborough
- Little Lever
- Littleport
- Liverpool 1,2,3,4,5,6,7,8,9,10 and 11 (Liverpool 12,13,14,15,16,17,18,19 and 20 opened between 1902 and 1999)
  - 1 (Toxteth),
  - 2 (Walton),
  - 3 (Bootle),
  - 4 (Breckfield, renamed Liverpool Beacon in 1980), situated in Everton
  - 5 (Roscommon Street, later renamed Liverpool China Street after the corps relocated, and then Liverpool Everton),
  - 6 (Temple, later renamed Liverpool Congress Hall, also unofficially known as Liverpool Central Corps),
  - 7 (Seaforth),
  - 8 (Toxteth Park, later renamed Liverpool Dingle),
  - 9 (Kensington),
  - 10 (Waterloo),
  - 11 (Edge Hill),
  - OPENED AFTER 1900
  - 12 (Garston),
  - 13 (Old Swan),
  - 14 (Aintree)
  - 15 (Clubmoor),
  - -- (Knotty Ash) (Bared the Liverpool name, but didn't have a Liverpool number)
  - 16 (Tuebrook),
  - -- (Wavertree) (Bared the Liverpool name, but didn't have a Liverpool number)
  - 17 (Speke),
  - 18 (Belle Vale),
  - 19 (Childwall Valley),
  - 20 (Stoneycroft),
  - Also records from The Salvation Army International Heritage Centre of Liverpool Stancombe Corps. There was a small corps in Kirkby which didn't bare a Liverpool name or number as it wasn't considered part of the City of Liverpool when it opened.
- Liverpool Slums 1,2 and 3
- Llanberis
- Llanelli
- Llanhilleth
- Llandidloes
- Llanrwst
- Lochee
- Lockerbie
- Loddon
- Long Eaton
- Long Sutton
- Longton
- Longtown
- Looe
- Loose
- Loughborough
- Loughborough Junction
- Louth
- Lower Broughton
- Lower Ince
- Ludlow
- Lurgan
- Luton 1 and 2
- Lutterworth
- Lye
- Lymington
- Lychett

== M ==
- Macclesfield
- Macduff
- Maerdy
- Maesteg
- Magherafelt
- Maidenhead
- Maidstone
- Maldon
- Malmesbury
- Malton
- Malvern
- Manchester
  - 1 (Temple),
  - 2 (Star Hall),
  - 3 (Openshaw),
  - 4 (Miles Platting),
  - 5 (Bradford Road),
  - 6 (Newton Heath),
  - 7 (Gorton),
  - 8 (Harpurhey),
  - 9 (Hightown),
  - 10 (Hulme),
  - 11 (Moss Side),
  - 12 (Longsight),
  - 13 (Greenheys)
- Manchester Slums
- Manor Park
- Mansfield
- March
- Margate
- Market Harborough
- Market Lavington
- Market Rasen
- Marlborough
- Marsden
- Marylebone
- Maryport
- Masborough
- Maybole
- Melbourne
- Melksham
- Merthyr Tydfil
- Metheringham
- Methwold
- Mevagissey
- Mexborough
- Middlesbrough 1,2,3 and 5
- Middlestown Circle
- Middleton Junction
- Middlewick
- Midsomer Norton
- Milford
- Millom
- Millwall Slums
- Milngavie
- Milnthorpe
- Milton
- Minster
- Misterton
- Mitcham
- Monifieth
- Montrose
- Morecambe
- Morley
- Morriston
- Motherwell
- Mountain Ash
- Mousehole
- Murton
- Mussleborough

== N ==
- Nailsworth
- Nantwich
- Nantymoel
- Narberth
- Neath
- Nelson
- Newark
- New Barnet
- New Basford
- New Brompton
- Newbury
- Newcastle 1,2,3 and 5
- Newcastle Slums
- Newcastle-under-Lyme
- Newhaven
- Newington
- New Lenton
- Newlyn
- New Mains
- New Mills
- Newmilns Circle
- Newport 1 and 2
- Newport, IoW
- Newport Pagnell
- New Rothwell
- Newry
- New Southgate
- Newton Abbot
- Newtownards
- Newtown, Dorset
- Newtown, Monmouthshire
- Neyland, Pembrokeshire
- Nine Elms
- Norland Castle
- Normanton 1 and 2
- Northampton 1,2,3 and 4
- Northampton Battery
- Northallerton
- Northleach
- North Shields
- North Somercotes
- North Walsham
- Northwich
- Norton Circle
- Norwich 1,2 and 3
- Nottingham 1,2,3 and 4
- Nottingham Slums
- Nottingham Battery
- Notting Hill
- Nuneaton
- Nunhead

== O ==
- Oakengates
- Oakhampton
- Old Basford
- Oldbury
- Old Ford
- Oldham 1 (Citadel), 2 (Lees Road) and 3 (Hope Street)
- Oswestry
- Otley
- Ottery St Mary
- Ovenden
- Owston Ferry
- Oxford 1 and 2
- Oxfordshire Battery

== P ==
- Padiham
- Paignton
- Paisley 1 and 2
- Parkgate
- Parkhead
- Parson's Drove
- Partick
- Peckham 1 and 2
- Peebles
- Peel
- Pembroke
- Pembroke Dock
- Pendlebury
- Pendleton
- Penge
- Penicuik
- Penrith
- Penryn
- Pensford
- Penshaw
- Pensilva
- Pentonville
- Pentre
- Penzance
- Perth
- Peterborough
- Peterhead
- Pill
- Plaistow
- Plumstead 1 and 2
- Plymouth 1,2 and 3
- Plympton
- Pokesdown
- Pollokshaws
- Ponders End
- Pontefract
- Pontycymmer
- Pontypool
- Pontypridd
- Poole
- Poplar
- Portadown
- Port Glasgow
- Porth
- Portland
- Portmadoc
- Portobello
- Portslade
- Portsmouth 1,2 and 3
- Potton
- Prescot
- Preston 1 and 2
- Preston Battery
- Prince's End
- Pudsey
- Pulborough

== R ==
- Radcliffe
- Rainham
- Ramsbottom
- Ramsbury
- Ramsey
- Ramsgate
- Ravensthorpe
- Rawtenstall
- Reading 1,2 and 3
- Redditch
- Redhill
- Redruth
- Reepham
- Regent Hall
- Renfrew
- Retford
- Rhos
- Richmond
- Ringwood
- Ripley
- Rishton
- Rochdale 1 (Citadel) and 2 (Shawclough)
- Rock Ferry
- Romford
- Romsey
- Rotherham
- Rotherhithe
- Rothesay
- Rothwell
- Rudgwick
- Rugby
- Runcorn
- Rushden
- Rutherglen
- Ryde
- Rye

== S ==
- Sheringham, Norfolk
- Skewen
- Southampton Shirley
- Southampton Sholing
- Southport
- Sunderland 1, 2, 3, 4, 5, 6, and 7
  - 1 (Citadel),
  - 2 (Monkwearmouth),
  - 3 (Southwick-on-Wear),
  - 4 (Hendon, Sunderland),
  - 5 (Pallion),
  - 6 (Ballast Hills),
  - 7 (Millfield, Tyne and Wear),
  - Also corps in (Grangetown, Sunderland), (Ryhope), (Houghton-le-Spring), (Hetton-le-Hole), (Washington, Tyne and Wear), (Easington Lane), (Penshaw) and (South Hylton). These did not bear Sunderland corps status or numbers as before 1900, these places were not classed as suburbs of Sunderland.
- Swansea 1, 2, 3, 4

== T ==
- Tadcaster
- Tadley Circle
- Tamworth
- Tarvin
- Taunton
- Tavistock
- Tayport
- Teddington
- Tenby
- Tewkesbury
- Tonbridge
- Tunbridge Wells

== W ==
- West Drayton Circle
- West Hartlepool
