= The Salvation Army in Australia =

Evangelical protestant Christian church

The Salvation Army, Australia Territory (nicknamed "Salvos" in Australian English) is an evangelical Protestant Christian church known for its charity work. It began operating in Australia in the late 19th century. There are currently 335 thrift stores and donation bins across Australia.

== History ==
The first Salvation Army meeting in Australia was held in 1880. Edward Saunders and John Gore led the meeting from the back of a greengrocer's cart in Adelaide Botanic Park with an offer of food for those who had not eaten. In 1883, Major James Barker led the way to establish the first Salvation Army social institution anywhere in the world on a permanent basis, known as the "Prison Gate" program. Barker saw that prisoners being released from the Melbourne Gaol had nowhere to go and no work, so they inevitably re-offended and returned to gaol. Barker leased a small house in Lygon Street, Carlton, to provide accommodation for prisoners discharged from Melbourne's gaols. This led to the formation of the Prison-Gate Brigade, the members of which met discharged prisoners upon their release and offered them a home and the prospect of a job. The Salvos also involved themselves in finding work for the unemployed and in re-uniting families.

=== Nineteenth century ===
In Melbourne from 1897 to 1910, the Army's Limelight Department originally established in 1891, was Australia's first film production company. The Army set up 'Biorama' companies with electric generators and projection equipment to travel around Australia, showing films produced by the Limelight Department along with other entertainments.

The Salvation Army grew quickly within Australia, but it was a growth fraught with difficulty. In its early days The Salvation Army often met with suspicion, derision and violence. Salvationists simply walking down the streets would often suffer abuse and sustain injury from thrown objects. Several local councils even passed by-laws forbidding Salvation Army street processions, and the police were liable to arrest them. From 1881 to 1907, across the country, more than 100 Salvationists were fined or jailed for holding street-meetings and marches.

Almost every night some of our soldiers are getting hurt. One night during the week, as we were all having our usual open-air meeting, a crowd of 200 roughs gathered around, and threw lumps of road metal. One piece struck the Captain on the mouth and split one of his teeth, and loosened two others; yet, with all, we were able to sing, 'Hallelujah!' "Another night a sister got struck on the head, almost forcing her to the ground. In the face of all, there are certain officials of the law who stand by and enjoy the brutal sport.

— War Cry magazine Brisbane, c. 1900

Despite persecution and prosecution the number of Salvation Army Corps grew at an amazing rate, so much so that by 1900 there were over 1,300 Corps and outposts across Australia and New Zealand, and The Salvation Army in Australasia could boast the following statistics:

- Officers & Cadets & Employees: 1929
- Soldiers (Members) estimated at 50,000
- Corps (Churches): 512
- Outposts: 858
- Training Homes: 2
- Women's Industrial Homes: 4
- Rescue Homes: 16
- Maternity Homes: 7
- Slum Posts & Women's Shelters: 5
- Prison-Gate Brigade Homes: 7
- Men's Shelters & Labour Yards: 6
- Men's Industrial Homes & Farms: 7
- League of Mercy: 4
- Military Home: 1

=== Twentieth century ===
In February 1917 it was announced eight Australians and four New Zealanders constituting the Pioneer Missionary Contingent would leave for China. The first Salvation Army corps was established in then-Pekin. Contingent members found a bleak winter, high walls, crowds, and many challenges. Members wore clothing collars that bore the Chinese characters '救 世 軍' for 'Save World Army'. The contingent continued into the 1930s.

Salvation Army captain Zara Dare (1886–1965) became one of the first two female police officers in Queensland in 1931.

Australia's George Carpenter was General of the Salvation Army (worldwide leader) from 1939 to 1946 and Eva Burrows during the 1980s and 1990s.

It is thought that the name of the popular biscuit by Arnotts, SAO, stands for ‘Salvation Army Officer’.

=== Australia One ===
On 30 November 2018, General Brian Peddle announced that the two territories of Australia (The Salvation Army, Australian Eastern Territory and The Salvation Army, Australia Southern Territory) were again one territory, to be known as the Australia Territory. This project was known as Australia One.

=== Statistics ===
The Salvation Army Year Book 2015 outlines the official statistics for the two Australian territories as of 1 January 2014. In The Salvation Army, Australian Eastern Territory:

- Officers: Officers 949 (523 active, 417 retired)
- Cadets: 15 (1st year), 19 (2nd year)
- Employees: 4,717
- Soldiers (Members) 8,151
- Adherents: 2,805
- Junior Soldiers: 587
- Corps (Churches): 161
- Outposts/Plants/Missions: 13
- Social Centres: 320
- Community Welfare Centres: 149
- Thrift Stores / Charity Shops: 229

In The Salvation Army, Australia Southern Territory:

- Officers: Officers 849 (493 active, 401 retired)
- Cadets: 26 (1st year), 18 (2nd year)
- Employees: 5,137
- Soldiers (Members) 7,121
- Adherents: 2,046
- Junior Soldiers: 1,186
- Corps (Churches): 163
- Outposts/Plants/Missions: 6
- Social Centres: 207
- Community Welfare Centres: 126
- Thrift Stores / Charity Shops: 210

Ninety-four cents in every dollar donated to The Salvation Army goes directly to those in need.

The Salvation Army helps more than one million Australians every year. In an average week, the Salvation Army provides an estimated:

- 100,000 meals for the hungry
- 2,000 beds for the homeless
- 5,000 to 8,000 food vouchers
- 1,000 people with assistance in finding employment
- Refuge to 500 victims of abuse
- Assistance to 500 people addicted to drugs, alcohol or gambling
- Several thousand people with counselling
- 3,000 elderly people with aged care services
- 1,000 people in the court system with chaplaincy services
- Family tracing services which locate 40 missing family members

The Salvos have grown to be one of Australia's most respected charitable organisations, with a 2009 survey by Sweeney Research and the advertising group Grey Global finding the Salvation Army and the nation's Ambulance Service to be Australia's most trusted entities.

== Australian sex abuse cases ==
From the 1940s to the 1980s the Salvation Army in Australia sheltered approximately 30,000 children. In 2006 the Australian Salvation Army acknowledged that sexual abuse may have occurred during this time and issued an apology. In it, the Army explicitly rejected a claim, made by a party unnamed in the apology, that there were as many as 500 potential claimants.

In 2013 it was reported that private settlements totalling A$15.5 million had been made in Victoria relating to 474 abuse cases; a Salvation Army spokesman said that "This should not have happened and this was a breach of the trust placed in us" and that they were "deeply sorry" whilst claiming that the abuse was "the result of individuals and not a culture within the organisation."

On 28 January 2014, the Royal Commission into Institutional Responses to Child Sexual Abuse, a royal commission of inquiry initiated in 2013 by the Australian Government and supported by all of its state governments, began an investigation into abuse cases at the Alkira Salvation Army Home for Boys at Indooroopilly; the Riverview Training Farm (also known as Endeavour Training Farm) at Riverview – both in Queensland; the Bexley Boys’ Home at Bexley; and the Gill Memorial Home at Goulburn – both in New South Wales. The investigation also examined The Salvation Army's processes in investigating, disciplining, and transferring or removing anyone accused of, or found to have engaged in, child sexual abuse in these homes. On 27 March 2014, the Royal Commission began an investigation into the handling by The Salvation Army (Eastern Territory) of claims of child sexual abuse between 1993 and 2014.

Many questions were raised during the course of the investigation as to whether high-ranking members of the organisation knew about these cases of child sexual abuse and failed to investigate, discipline, sack and prosecute sex offenders while boys and girls were beaten, bashed and raped.

The Royal Commission published a case study report on the findings and recommendations for one of the abovementioned case studies.

== See also ==
- Christianity in Australia
- Religion in Australia
- Prosperity Theology
