= The Salvation Army, Australia Southern Territory =

The Salvation Army, Australian Southern Territory or (AUS) was one of two administrative territories. On Friday 30 November 2018, General Brian Peddle announced that the Southern Territory and Eastern Territory were reunited and The Salvation Army in Australia would again be one territory.

It covered four states and one Australian territory of the country. The AUS was geographically sub-divided into eight divisions, all under different Divisional Leaders, each reporting directly to the Territorial Commander. Its headquarters were located on Railway Road, in Blackburn, Victoria.

== History ==
The Salvation Army in Australia, was not originally separated into two Territories, but existed administratively as one. It was known as The Australasian Territory from 1880 until it was renamed The Australian Territory in 1907, which it remained until the split into two territories in 1921. The two territories were reunited on 30 November 2018.

== Structure ==
The Territorial Commander (TC) and Chief Secretary are appointed by the General, their role is to oversee and administer the work of The Salvation Army within the Territory, they are assisted by various other Secretaries (departmental heads) who are, in turn, responsible for overseeing their various branches of Army activity.

The TC is responsible for the Army's overall operation and mission, and the Chief Secretary is responsible for the territory's administration and daily operations. Senior executive Officers are, on the recommendation of the Territorial Commander, also appointed by the General.

All other Officer appointments within a Territory are the responsibility of the Territorial Commander and The Cabinet. This Cabinet refers to the territory's administrative System. The five member Administrative Cabinet – similar to a Board – determines policy and strategy for the Territory, particularly as it relates to the future.

== Administrative regions ==
The Australian Southern Territory was broken up into smaller administrative regions, largely by state. The exception to this being the state of Victoria, divided into three divisions for corps related administration; social work related administration is handled by the statewide body State Social Command Victoria.

Division	Headquarters	Commander	Corps	Centres
Central Victoria Division	Thomastown			
Eastern Victoria Division	Mitcham			
Northern Territory Region	Darwin			
South Australia Division	Fullarton			
State Social Command Victoria	Coburg North			
Tasmania Division	New Town			
Western Australia Division	Northbridge			
Western Victoria Division	Ballarat			

== Australian sex abuse cases ==
From the 1940s to the 1980s the Salvation Army in Australia sheltered approximately 30,000 children. In 2006 the Australian division of The Salvation Army acknowledged that sexual abuse may have occurred during this time and issued an apology. In it, the Army explicitly rejected a claim, made by a party unnamed in the apology, that there were as many as 500 potential claimants.

In 2013 it was reported that private settlements totaling A$15.5 million had been made in Victoria relating to 474 abuse cases; a Salvation Army spokesman said that "This should not have happened and this was a breach of the trust placed in us" and that they were "deeply sorry" whilst claiming that the abuse was "the result of individuals and not a culture within the organization."

On 28 January 2014, the Royal Commission into Institutional Responses to Child Sexual Abuse, a royal commission of inquiry initiated in 2013 by the Australian Government and supported by all of its state governments, began an investigation into abuse cases at homes under the managements and direction of The Salvation Army, Australia Eastern Territory in both Queensland and New South Wales.

== See also ==
- The Salvation Army in Australia
- The Salvation Army, Australia Eastern Territory
