= Songster =

Musician or singer in the southern US or the Salvation Army

A songster (plural songsters) is a musician, usually a singer; notably in the southern United States and the Salvation Army.

== Songsters in American culture ==
A "songster" is a wandering musician, usually but not always African-American, of the type which first appeared in the late 19th century in the southern United States. The songster tradition both pre-dated and co-existed with blues music. It began soon after the end of slavery and the Reconstruction era in the United States, when African-American musicians became able to travel and play music for a living. Black and white musicians shared the same repertoire and thought of themselves as "songsters" rather than "blues" musicians.

Songsters generally performed a wide variety of folk songs, ballads, dance tunes, reels and minstrel songs. Initially, they were often accompanied by non-singing "musicianers", who often played banjo and fiddle. Later, as the guitar became more widely popular, the songsters often accompanied themselves.

Songsters often accompanied medicine shows, which moved from place to place selling salves and elixirs. As entertainers, songsters had the task of enticing a public, to whom the concoctions were then offered. One published in 1886 by Professor Lorman, "The Great Disease Detective" of Philadelphia. "The Lorman's Indian Oil Star Specialty SONGSTER" announced on the booklet's title page that it contained "an entirely new and original collection of Songs now being sung nightly by the members of the above named excellent company, together with all the popular Songs of the day." Along with ads for Lorman's full range of medicines, the songster included a cast list introducing an "ever welcome Vocalist and Organist," a "celebrated Comedian and End Man," the "Funniest End-Man in the business in his Funny Sayings, Banjo Solos, and popular Songs of the Day," and the medicine-wagon driver, "admired for his dexterity in handling the Ribbons on the Golden Chariot." Song lyrics in the booklet include such tunes as "You Can't Do It, You Know" (music by George Schleiffarth, lyrics by Nat C. Goodwin), "The Letter That Never Came," (sung by Billy Cronin in the play One of the Bravest. As these shows declined, and listening to recorded music and dancing in juke joints and honky tonks became more popular, so the older songster style became less fashionable.

Songsters had a notable influence on blues music, which developed from around the turn of the 20th century. However, there was also a change in song styles. Songsters often sang composed songs or traditional ballads, frequently about legendary heroes or characters such as "Frankie and Johnny" and "Stagger Lee". Blues singers, in contrast, tended to invent their own lyrics (or recycle those of others) and develop their own tunes and guitar (or sometimes piano) playing styles, singing of their own lives and shared emotional experiences.

Many of the earliest recordings of what is now referred to as the blues were made by songsters who commanded a much wider repertoire, often extending to popular Tin Pan Alley songs of the day as well as the "authentic" country blues. There is a growing view among scholars that the distinction made by experts such as Alan Lomax between "deep" blues singers and "songsters" is an artificial one, and that in fact most of the leading archetypal blues artists, including Robert Johnson and Muddy Waters, performed a wide variety of music in public, but recorded only that proportion of their material which was seen by their producers as original or innovative.

== Songsters in the Salvation Army ==
In The Salvation Army the term "songster" refers to an adult chorister in a Salvation Army choir, formally called a "Songster Brigade". The plural form "songsters" is commonly used to refer to a Songster Brigade when preceded by the definite article. Songsters commonly sing in worship services and can be used to teach congregations new songs.

Songster Brigades are led by a Songster Leader, who is assisted by a Deputy Songster Leader. Brigades are helped administratively by a Songster Sergeant, Songster Secretary and a Songster Treasurer who all assist the Songster Leader in the organization of the brigade. There is also a Songster Librarian, who handles and organizes the music, and a Songster Pianist.

Individual Salvation Army corps (churches) commonly have their own Songster Brigade, while others have been formed to represent wider regions or countries, such as the International Staff Songsters.

== Examples of songsters ==
- Blind Blake
- Rabbit Brown
- Mississippi John Hurt
- Papa Charlie Jackson
- Jim Jackson
- Lead Belly
- Furry Lewis
- Mance Lipscomb
- Charley Patton
- Jimmy Rogers
- Cootie Stark
- Frank Stokes
- Henry Thomas
- Bob Wills

== See also ==
- Category:Songster musicians
- Troubadour
