= Household Troops Band =

The Household Troops Band (HTB) is a brass band associated with the Salvation Army. It consists of musicians who are Salvation Army members from various regions across the United Kingdom. The band regularly performs at Salvation Army corps and venues throughout the UK and engages in annual recording projects. Throughout its history, the band has embarked on international tours to numerous countries.

== History ==
In the early summer of 1885, there was a "Great Kent March" by Salvation Army Officer Cadets (known as "Life Guards"), headed by a band of 25 brass instrumentalists. It was later suggested that a permanent band might be established, and a War Cry (Salvation Army newspaper) advert called for volunteers.

The Household Troops Band was formed with Staff-Captain Harry Appleby as bandmaster. No salary was offered and no guarantee was given apart from food and clothing. On 1 June 1887, the original 25 members of the Household Troops Band left Clapton Congress Hall for a six month tour. The next year, in October, the band left for Canada as the first British Salvation Army band to cross the Atlantic. The tour was a success and led to Canada's own Household Troops Band being formed.

Whilst they were away, a second group of players was inaugurated under the leadership of Samuel Webber. On 14 October 1889, in the country village of Whitchurch in Hampshire, it was reported that the Household Troops Band led a march of over 1000 Salvationists. The march was in support of the local Salvationists, who had suffered persecution and injury in the Whitchurch Riots; over 800 had been imprisoned for conducting open-air services. This demonstration, and others led by the local Corps, likely led to The Salvation Army winning a legal case allowing them the right to play and preach in the open air.

The first Troops band returned home to Britain in 1891. Later, the two bands amalgamated into one. In 1893, the band was dissolved, and the International Headquarters Staff Band (now known as the International Staff Band) was formed instead.

== Modern band ==
In 1985, Captain John Mott, then National Bandmaster, established a new Household Troops Band by selecting members from the "A" Band at the National School of Music, Cobham Hall. Following his retirement on 16 October 2010, Major John Mott was succeeded by Carl Saunders. The band is composed of individuals from various Salvation Army centers. It conducts a limited number of rehearsals to prepare for the Summer Tour, which is the main focus of their work. These tours usually take place during the last week of August and are primarily held in coastal resorts, where larger holiday crowds gather, sometimes straining the resources of local Corps due to the vacation season.

A notable aspect of the band is their march to afternoon open-air venues. The band cooperates with local law enforcement for traffic control. Subsequently, in the evening, they hold a Festival in the local Citadel.

The band has embarked on various tours over the years, including the South Coast in 1985, the Bournemouth area in 1991, the East Coast in 1996, and Essex, Kent & Dorset in 1997, among others. Additionally, the band releases a CD recording nearly every year.

Regarded as one of the prominent Salvation Army Bands in the UK, the Household Troops Band shares this distinction with the International Staff Band. Notably, the Household Troops Band stands out within the Salvation Army as the only band internationally known for wearing pith helmets.

== See also ==
- Maidenhead Citadel Band
- Salvation Army Band
- The Salvation Army
- International Staff Band
- Chalk Farm Salvation Army Band
- Brass Band
- Melbourne Staff Band
