= Salvation Army brass band =

Brass band affiliated with the Salvation Army

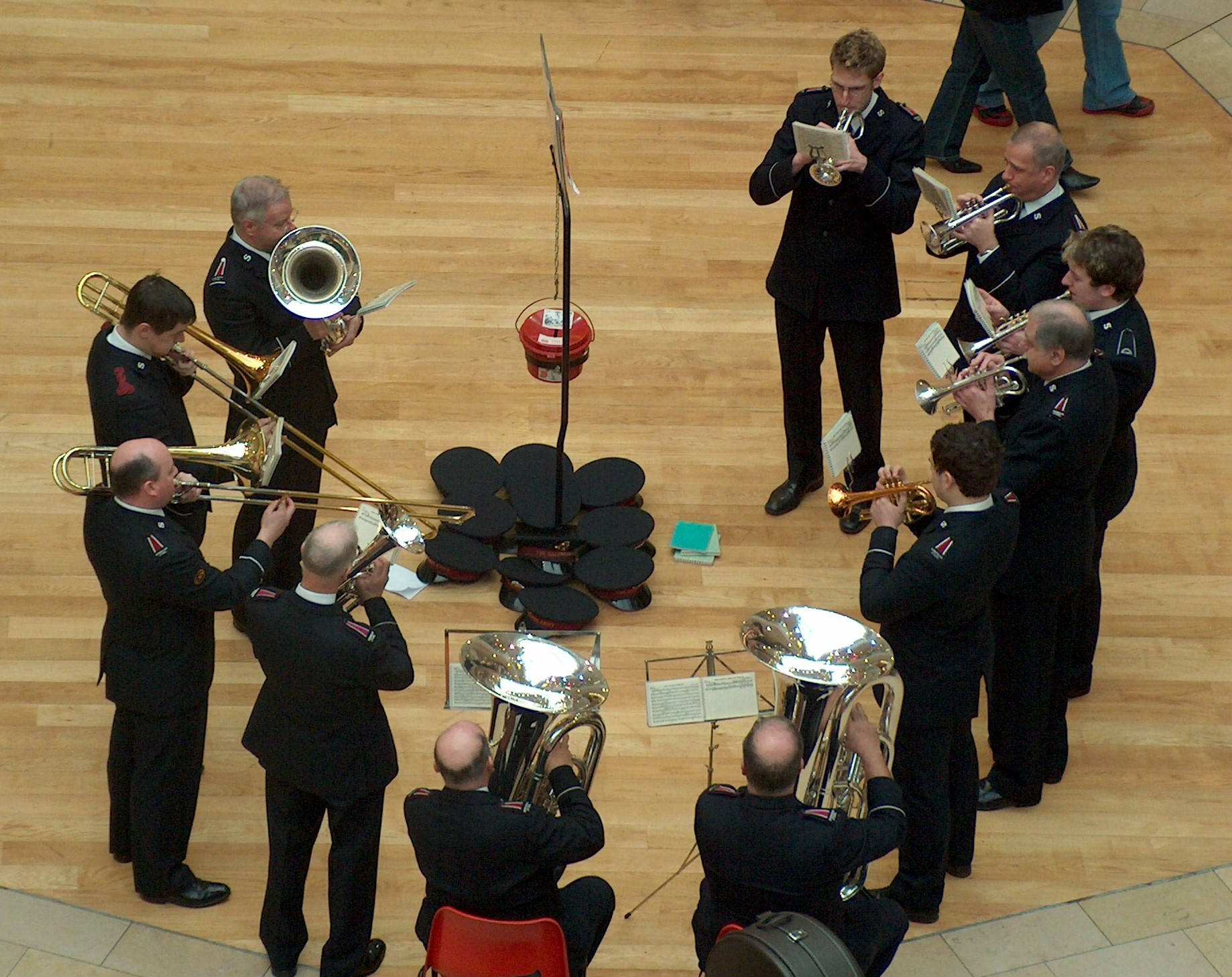
The Salvation Army Brass Band in the Bullring in Birmingham, 2005

A Salvation Army brass band is a brass band affiliated with a Corps, Division or Territory of the Salvation Army. In society, a Salvation Army band playing in public places during Christian events in the calendar such as Christmas has become a part of seasonal customs, particularly in the UK.

== History ==
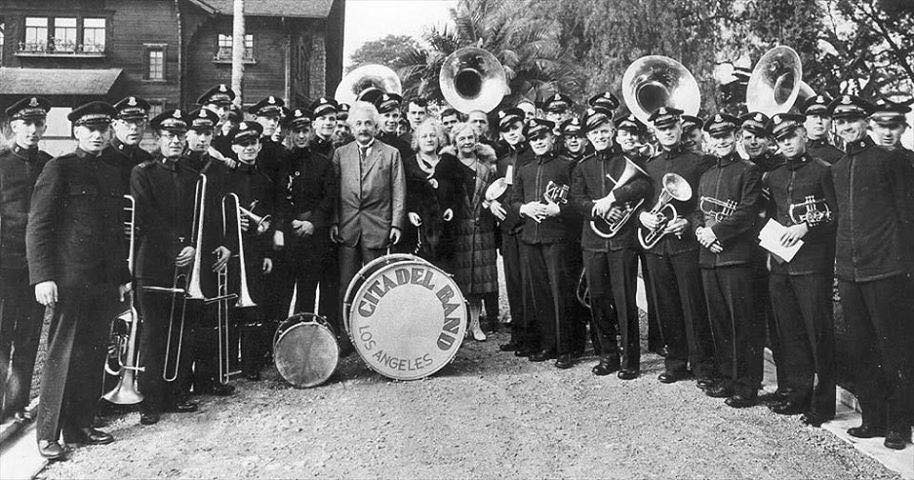
Albert Einstein and a Salvation Army band before a performance at the Rose Bowl Parade, in California, 1926.

The early Salvationists, as today, took their Gospel message to the people in their own environments, largely in the streets and markets of the towns. In 1878 Charles Fry and his three sons formed a brass quartet which played during outdoor meetings. The Army's founder, William Booth, came to hear of them, and started to use them in his own campaign. Over time the Fry ensemble was augmented with other instruments, not exclusively brass, and became famous under names such as "The Hallelujah Minstrels" and "The Happy Band". The Fry family themselves very soon gave up their family business and joined the Salvation Army full-time.

The first ever Salvation Army Corps Band was formed in December 1879 in Consett, County Durham, a former steelworking town, another followed later in Northwich, Cheshire in 1880. It was not long before the Army fully adopted the use of music in its work, and the Salvation Army Headquarters eventually established the International Staff Band, its flagship ensemble, in 1891.

Gradually the bands developed into the same basic format as the traditional amateur brass band and a rich repertoire of music was adapted, arranged and composed for the Salvation Army specifically. Many of the leading brass band composers and players of the 20th century had roots in or close links with the Salvation Army.

== Influences on secular brass bands ==
The Salvation Army kept itself apart from the secular brass band world. They did not enter contests or play music other than their own - which had been specifically written or arranged for them. Secular tunes were used, but arranged to reflect the spiritual work they supported.

Around the same time that the Salvation Army bands were forming the temperance movement was also using brass bands to promote its message. These, however, were integrated with the other amateur brass bands - and the vestiges of their influence can still be seen in the names of some of the bands today.

The Salvationist movement in recent years has opened up its doors to its colleagues in the secular brass band world, thereby making a rich resource of music available for other bands to play.

== Instrumentation ==
Brass bands in the British tradition are limited to cornets, flugelhorns, tenor horns (known as alto horns in U.S.A), baritones, trombones, euphoniums, tubas (known as basses in brass bands), and percussion; but not trumpets or French horns, since they are orchestral and concert band instruments.

With the exception of the bass trombone and percussion, all parts are transposing and written in the treble clef, which means that for every instrument, the fingering for the written notes is the same. This system, which is unique to UK-style brass bands, ensures most parts can be covered when there is less than a full complement of players. The orchestration in Salvation Army banding is almost identical to that of secular banding except for a minor difference in the cornet section whereby the ripieno is dropped and the remainder of the row is made up of parts designated 1st and 2nd (two players each) rather than 2nd and 3rd; and that some major pieces have a split first trombone part, the lower part usually cued elsewhere in the band.

== Corps bands ==
The corps (church) band, for example the Parramatta Citadel Band, is the basic unit of Salvation Army banding. These are the local bands, supporting worship services each Sunday and other special events as needed by the corps. Corps bands range in size from a quartet to 40 or more players. Primarily the bands play from the Salvation Army Tune Book, for some smaller bands the playing of these simple hymn tunes is their primary function, some usually smaller bands are limited to this, however many extend to more complex pieces such as marches.

The primary function of a corps band is to support the Sunday worship services of the corps. Unlike a band which is primarily doing concerts, a corps band usually does not develop a standing repertoire. The typical corps band plays one or two pieces each Sunday morning, plus accompaniment for congregational singing. The corps bandmaster must have a ready list of items that can be played without rehearsal, in case key players are missing on a particular week. Corps bands also support a variety of other corps activities, either as a complete unit or in ensembles.

Members of a corps band are usually soldiers of the corps. The corps officer, as the commander of the unit, functions as the executive officer.

== Regional bands ==
Regional bands are usually sponsored by an area command or a divisional headquarters. Some regional bands are formed because there are no large corps bands in the area. The regional band, drawing on several corps, can complete the instrumentation and play more complex music. Some regional bands serve as elite groups, with the better players in an area in the group. The staff band can be thought of as the extreme case of a regional band. Many youth bands are regional in character.

Regional bands are more concert-oriented than corps bands, although many regional bands serve as duty bands for large meetings and events. Many regional bands rehearse less frequently than once a week, especially those covering a large geographic area. Also, some regional bands operate on a seasonal basis, for example, not operating during the summer months.

Most regional bands have a more formal structure than the typical corps band. Usually, a ranking officer from the sponsoring command serves as executive officer. There is usually an official band board. Board positions such as band sergeant, secretary, quartermaster, and librarian are often filled. Many regional groups have strict admission or audition standards. Membership in a corps band in the region is almost always required.

== Youth bands ==
One of the major reasons why the Salvation Army has had a thriving brass band movement for over 100 years is the youth band and associated music education programs. Beginning at the corps level, many young Salvationists are taught to play and sing, starting sometimes as early as seven years of age. These are normally called young people's ("YP") bands. Some small regions, known in the Salvation Army as divisions, will have a Divisional Youth Band drawn from people aged 13–30 who live within the area covered by the division. One such example is Sydney Youth Band. Bigger areas are known in the Salvation Army as Territories: e.g. the United Kingdom with the Republic of Ireland territory hosts what is known as the Territorial Youth Band (TYB) for youth aged 12–18. In the Southern United States, divisions commonly run summer music conservatories that provide multi-week programs emphasizing both instrumental study and participation in Christian devotional practices.

== Fellowship bands ==
In recent years, the fellowship band has become an increasingly popular form of Salvation Army ensemble. These groups take a variety of forms, including bands made up mostly of players who have retired from other bands, which is one of the most common. One such group is Vintage Brass, sponsored by the Long Beach Citadel corps in California. Because most fellowship bands have a less formal structure and less demanding schedule than regular Salvation Army bands, they are sometimes seen as casual or lesser ensembles.

However, many fellowship groups are excellent musically and rival some of the top standing ensembles in the quality of their performance. One example of this in the UK is the South London Fellowship Band, which meets for rehearsal on a fortnightly basis throughout the year and provides concerts and musical programmes on invitation from a variety of sources - Corps' in the South East of England and further afield, as well as Churches and charities.

== Staff Bands and Territorial Bands ==
The Staff Bands and Territorial Bands are the top level of Salvation Army banding. Staff Bands are the premier band in their respective Territories and perform a number of duties such as giving Brass workshops, providing music for Territorial events, and giving concerts both within their Territory and Internationally. Staff Bandsmen (members of a Staff Band) are often found on the staff of Territorial and Divisional Music Camps and Music Schools, both in their own Territory and Internationally.

A Staff Band is sponsored by a territorial headquarters. Territorial Bands are sponsored by a Territorial Headquarters and serve a similar role to Staff Bands, but have not been designated as such. The Staff Bands were originally made up of staff members from the headquarters they are attached to. Although most staff bands still have many Salvation Army officer and employee members, non-staff players are more common in the modern Staff Band. The Staff Bands are among the most formal Salvation Army groups. Most have long histories, and travel and record on a regular basis. Most Staff Bands have websites and YouTube channels where you can find recordings and videos of concerts.

The first band to hold the designation of Staff Band was the US National Headquarters Staff Band (Now the New York Staff Band) which was formed in 1887.

There are eleven Staff Bands that have been given that designation by the General and one Territorial Band. The International Staff Band is considered to be the premier band of the Army:

- -Staff Bands:
- Amsterdam (Netherlands)(1962)
- Canadian (Canada and Bermuda)(1907-1914, reformed 1969)
- Chicago (USA Central) (1904)
- German (Germany)(1989)
- Hong Kong (Hong Kong and Macau)(2008)
- International (United Kingdom)(1891)
- Japan (Japan)(1902)
- Melbourne (Australia)(1890)
- New York (USA East)(1887)
- USA West (USA Western)(Formed in the 1920's and Designated a Staff Band in 2012)
- USA Southern Staff Band (USA South)(2022)
- -Territorial Bands:
- Kinshasa (Democratic Republic of Congo - 2014)

== Bandsmen/bandswomen ==
Salvation Army musicians have some common characteristics - almost all Salvation Army bands have standards such as those listed below.

- The musician must be a member, in good standing, of a corps. In most cases, the individual must be enrolled as a soldier. Youth bands usually require that members attend a corps regularly and be of the proper age.
- Most bands have some standards of musicianship. For example, a corps band may require that anyone wishing to join the band be able to play selected tunes from the Band Tune Book. Larger bands such as regional groups often have audition and/or invitation policies.
- Salvationist musicians are volunteers. No monetary compensation is given for service in a band. Even composers and arrangers whose work is published in the various Salvation Army music publications are not generally compensated except for nominal amounts.

Some bands will have band reservists who are elderly players that have retired from the band. Reservists may play from time to time if needed.

== Band board ==
A band board is a committee that oversees the operations of a band. Most corps bands do not have full, formal boards. The definitions below are generic; each band may have its own variation on the scope and composition of the band board. In larger bands some positions may hold secondary positions for example Deputy Bandmaster or Assistant Secretary.

- Executive Officer

All Salvation Army bands are sponsored by some level of the command structure. The executive officer is the official representative of the sponsoring organization. This person serves as the chairman of the band board. In some cases, the executive officer is not a player in the band.

For a corps band, the corps officer is the de facto executive officer.

- Bandmaster

The bandmaster is the musical director and conductor of the band. This person has the primary responsibility for selecting music, developing performance programs, and setting the musical standards for the group. In a corps setting, the bandmaster is a senior local officer, with an automatic seat on the corps council. Regional and staff bandmasters are usually appointed by the commander of the sponsoring unit.

- Deputy Bandmaster

The Deputy Bandmaster is the second in command as far as leadership of the group is concerned. If the Bandmaster is away, for whatever reason, the Deputy Bandmaster assumes control of the group. This is also true of situations where the Bandmaster is playing with the group as a soloist, or if the group splits in two, as many larger bands do while on tour. This person is also responsible to help the Bandmaster in any of his own duties.
In a corps setting, the Deputy Bandmaster is also a senior local officer, and is generally a member of the corps council. While not an essential position, many bands have a Deputy Bandmaster.

- Secretary

The duties of the band secretary include recording the minutes and decisions of the band board, communication between the board and the players, and logistical details for engagements. When a band travels, the secretary is responsible for making the transportation and accommodation arrangements. If dues are collected, the secretary handles them unless a treasurer is designated. The band secretary is usually a player.

- Sergeant

Salvation Army bands have a spiritual purpose. The band sergeant is the band's chaplain. The sergeant also handles discipline and attendance problems. The band sergeant is usually a player.

- Quartermaster

The quartermaster is responsible for the band's uniforms and equipment, including any instruments owned by the band. The quartermaster is usually a player.

- Librarian

The band librarian is responsible for the music library, and the distribution of parts to the appropriate players. The librarian is usually a player.

== See also ==
- Callender's Cableworks Band which began as a Salvation Army band in the 1890s, and then transitioned to a temperance band before receiving the patronage of the members' employer, Callender's Cable Works.
- Household Troops Band which was of the precursors to the International Staff Band.
