= The Salvation Army, Parramatta =

General information
- Coordinates: 33°48′48″S 151°00′25″E

The Salvation Army, Parramatta (often abbreviated to PSA) is a Salvation Army Corps located in the suburb of Parramatta, New South Wales, Australia. It is the 75th oldest active Salvation Army Corps in Australia. Situated in the western suburbs of Sydney, it has survived two arson attacks, been led by some of the most prominent Australian Salvation Army officers of the modern era, and has actively ministered to the people of Parramatta and the surrounding regions since 1884.

== History ==
The Salvation Army's ministry in Parramatta started in September 1884, at the corner of Church and Argyle Streets. In 1919, the first permanent church building was opened in George Street, opposite the Roxy Theatre.

In 1969, after compulsory land acquisition by Parramatta City Council, Parramatta Salvation Army moved to a new site at 34 Smith Street, Parramatta. Over the years, this site housed the main citadel, an auxiliary hall, church office space, Divisional Headquarters, Christian bookstore, and community welfare services.

In 1973, the Corps was subject to two arson attacks. The first, in January, caused approximately $30,000 damage and saw the Corps unable to use their buildings fully until May of that year. The second, in September, caused a further $16,000 damage.

On 14 January 2018, Granville Corps officially merged with Parramatta Corps. In March 2018, The Salvation Army vacated their Smith Street citadel, beginning the move to 426 Church Street, North Parramatta. While the new facility is being renovated, the majority of ministry activities are being held at 60 Good Street, Granville (former home of Granville Corps), with the exception of the Corps social welfare programs, which are run from the ground level of the new Church Street site. The construction of the new Corps building is expected to begin in the middle of 2019, with the opening currently scheduled for February 2020.

== Music Sections ==
The Salvation Army - Parramatta has a number of music sections, including Brass Band, Contemporary Worship Ensemble, Songsters, and junior groups. These serve the primary purpose of supporting corporate worship.

=== Brass Band ===
Parramatta Citadel Band (PCB), part of Parramatta Salvation Army, is a typical Salvation Army Band with a membership of approximately 30-35 people. It has existed uninterrupted for close to a century. The bands purpose is to minister the word of God to the people of Parramatta and its surrounding area's through the use of music found in the Salvation Army Brass Band Tune Books. They also commonly use arranged music of both secular and Christian origin for open-airs and concerts. The motto of the Band is derived from psalm 150: "Praise Him with Melody." The Band is currently under the leadership of Major David Collinson.

=== Songsters ===
The ‘Songsters' have been a long-standing fixture of the Parramatta Corps. Songsters are a four-part choral group that aim to bring the message of Jesus Christ to those that don't know him and also bless the congregation each Sunday through song. The songsters are supported by a small ensemble of musicians on instruments including piano, bass guitar, and drums.

As well as local ministry, the group has toured in areas such as Asia (June 2001), Perth (2006), and other New South Wales regional centres such as Tamworth and Dubbo. The group also sings within the community at Christmas time, sharing carols and Christmas songs in shopping centres and carol services.

The following individuals have held the role of 'Songster Leader' since 1969:

- Errol Grice
- Ross Duncan
- Jim Muir
- Margaret Poore
- Murray Mayday
- Matthew Pethybridge
- Nicola Poore
- Tannie Kwong

=== YP Band ===
The Standard of The Salvation Army, of which the YP Band marches under.

The Parramatta YP (Young Peoples) Band is a brass band and was formed in 1944, its main objective is to provide a medium in which young people can worship God (through the playing of brass instruments) and also partake in fellowship with other like-minded young men and women. The band is made up of young people ranging from ages 7 to 23.

The Parramatta YP Band has toured all around New South Wales, this usually consists of a Saturday night concert, followed by a worship service at the local Salvation Army Corps on the Sunday morning.

== Children's Ministry ==
The Children’s Ministry at the Parramatta Corps is co-ordinated by a "Young People’s Sergeant Major", commonly abbreviated to "YPSM". This person is responsible for organising and leading the various ministries the corps runs for youth and children. As of present, the role is unfilled, with the departure of the previous YPSM Carissa Ainsworth in the first half of 2019 to take up the role of Ministry Co-Ordinator for the Greater Penrith and Mt Druitt Region.

Parramatta Corps provides groups for both children and adolescents. These groups are often led by members of the Corps and include:

- Mini God Squad is held on Sundays prior to the morning meeting and is often involves games, activities, music and Bible stories for children from 2 years of age until they complete year 2 at school. It is a basic introduction to Christianity.
- God Squad is held prior to the meeting on Sunday. It aims to teach the values of the Christian faith and often involves games and live music for children of primary school age. The live music is of a contemporary nature and features songs from current Christian groups. It is sung by the children with an accompaniment of drums, bass guitar and electric guitar.

=== Junior Soldiers ===
Junior Soldiers is an age-specific program run by some Salvation Army Corps for children aged 7–13 years. Designed to increase Bible knowledge, as well as knowledge on the doctrine and history of The Salvation Army, the junior soldier program encourages children to model their lives in a Christ-like manner from a young age, through the provision of age-appropriate lessons.

The program consists of a weekly teaching time and an award scheme. The award work allows the Junior Soldiers to complete tasks that help them to understand how they can daily live out their Christian faith. Every Corps that utilises the Junior Soldiers program is compelled to have someone to oversee this program. Within the Corps, this person is known as the "Junior Soldier Sergeant". The role of "Junior Soldier Sergeant" at Parramatta Salvation Army is currently unfilled.

== Parramatta Salvation Army Football Club ==
A Generals player in action

Parramatta Corps was home of the Parramatta Salvation Army Football Club, the Generals, a member club of the New South Wales Churches Football Association. They were a Senior team that played in the NSWCFA's Raahauge Cup 1. Little is known about the history of the club other than that it has existed in several stints over the past 30 years. The records that are available indicate that Parramatta Salvation Army, as they were known then, tasted success in 1992, as All-Age Division 4 Runners-up and in 1994, as All-Age Division 3 Premiers. On both these occasions the teams were under the coaching of Arthur Hodge.

The football club was revived in 2006 and took on the moniker The Generals, however this revival was relatively short lived, and the club is currently defunct.

== See also ==
- Sydney Congress Hall
- The Salvation Army, Australia Eastern Territory
