= Sydney Youth Band =

Salvation Army brass band in Australia

Sydney Youth Band of The Salvation Army
- Also known as: SYB
- Origin: Sydney, New South Wales, Australia
- Genres: Brass Band
- Years active: 2001 – present
- Labels: Salvationist Publishing & Supplies Ltd
- Website: www.sydneyyouthband.com

The Sydney Youth Band of the Salvation Army (or SYB) is a brass band based in Sydney New South Wales, whose membership is that of people aged 13–30. It is primarily made up of Salvation Army members, including soldiers and others that attend The Salvation Army. It is a part of the Salvation Army's NSW/ACT Division but functions more as a regional youth band for the Sydney, Newcastle and Wollongong area.

== Performances and Tours ==
SYB in an alley in Melbourne during their tour in 2008.

- SYB performed with the Melbourne Staff Band when they toured in 2007.
- They participated in 2007's Salvation Army commissioning weekend activities playing in a concert with Sydney Congress Hall Band, The Sydney Veterans Band and Brisbane City Temple Band. These four bands then combined to make a "mass band" celebrating Sydney Congress Hall's 125th anniversary celebrations.
- The band performed at 2008's World Youth Day celebrations in front of 200,000 people. Specifically, at the re-enactment of the Stations of the Cross at Barangaroo on Friday 18 July.
- A group of six performers from the band performed the Salvation Army hymn tune Abide With Me on Channel Seven's Sunrise morning program.
- The band toured Victoria from 29 to 31 August in 2008. They visited South Barwon and Warragul Corps as well as Melbourne City Temple.
- SYB played with James Morrison and The Onfire Big Band at Sydney Congress Hall in November 2008, for a Christmas concert.
- The 'PNG Tour 09', which commenced in early July 2009, saw the band playing their unique style of Brass in crowds of up to 3000+ people, they were the first foreign Salvation Army band to tour Papua New Guinea since The Salvation Army, Campsie Corps Band in 1985.

== Bandmasters ==
Bandmaster	Period Served
Graeme Press	2001–2002
James Hill	2002–2009
Joshua Mann	2009–2013
Brad Lucas	2014
Captain Peter Gott	2015–2017
Ron Prussing	2018–present

== Ronald Prussing ==
Ronald J. Prussing is the current bandmaster of the Sydney Youth Band. After graduating from the Sydney Conservatorium of Music in 1974, Ronald was appointed to Principal Trombone in the Sydney Elizabethan Orchestra, currently known as the Australian Opera and Ballet Orchestra. He held this position for two years. He was also appointed to Associate Principal Trombone of the Sydney Symphony Orchestra (SSO) until 1986 when he was appointed to Principal. Ronald has been bandmaster to many bands, including the one and only Sydney Congress Hall Band. Ronald has had a very successful musical career, however his appointment to the Sydney Youth Band was a turning point in his career. Since becoming bandmaster of the Sydney Youth Band, Ronald has been quoted to have said "I wish I was the Bandmaster when SYB was still good”.

== The Band Executive ==
As of 31 July 2018 the SYB band executive is:

Role	Name
Bandmaster	Ronald J. Prussing
Leadership Team	Jordan O'Brien, Linda Wells, Mackenzie Anderson
Executive Officer	Major John Viles (part time Officer, full time passenger)
