= International Staff Band =

Brass band of The Salvation Army

- Brass band
- Short name: ISB
- Founded: 1891 (135 years ago)
- Location: London, United Kingdom
- Music director: Jonathan Evans

The International Staff Band (ISB) is the premier brass band of the Salvation Army. Based in London, UK, the band performs Christian music in concerts, worship services, television and radio broadcasts, and studio recordings.

In 2008, the ISB released the album Together on Universal Classics and Jazz, which was nominated for NS&I Album of the Year at the 2009 Classical BRIT Awards. In January 2026, Jonathan Evans became the Bandmaster of the ISB, succeeding Dr Stephen Cobb who had held the position since April 1994.

== History and purpose ==
The International Staff Band was officially established on 7th October 1891 by Bramwell Booth, as a brass band composed of staff of the Salvation Army's International Headquarters (IHQ) in London. While its membership is no longer exclusively headquarters staff, the International Staff Band continues to be based in London and describes its purpose as:

...to spread the message of Christ primarily through music and aims for the highest standards of Salvation Army Christian music making. The band visits Salvation Army church centres throughout the UK on a monthly basis, presenting concerts (of varied Christian music) and leading worship and open-air services.

All band members are actively involved in their local Salvation Army churches across England and Wales, with many holding leadership positions. Like other Salvation Army bands, but unusually for a British brass band, the ISB does not participate in contests or competitions.

== Activities ==
The International Staff Band makes monthly visits to Salvation Army centres around the UK, presenting musical concerts and leading worship and open-air meetings. On a normal weekend Corps visit, the band will present a concert on a Saturday evening, lead the Sunday worship meetings, and sometimes present a further concert at the local Salvation Army Church on Sunday afternoon. The band also participates in most major Salvation Army events held in venues including London's Royal Albert Hall, Wembley Conference Centre and Royal Festival Hall, often alongside the International Staff Songsters. The ISB is featured frequently in national television and radio broadcasts including BBC Songs of Praise, BBC Radio 2's Sunday Half Hour and Listen to the Band.

In addition to its activities in the UK, the ISB has toured extensively, including the United States, Switzerland, Canada, Australia, New Zealand and Japan. The band has released numerous collaborative recordings, such as The Heaton Collection (2002-2018) with Black Dyke Band; a six-album project featuring the works of Wilfred Heaton.

In recent years, the ISB has also represented Salvation Army bands at the National Brass Band Championships’ Gala Concerts in the Royal Albert Hall, London, as well as at other significant brass banding occasions.

In June 2011, the band celebrated its 120th anniversary with a weekend of events in London, culminating in a day of concerts at the Royal Albert Hall on Saturday 4 June in which all eight Salvation Army staff bands took part.

== Recordings ==
The ISB regularly produces recordings, distributed by SP&S. Albums have included:

- Heritage Series Vol. 8 – Music from the 2000s (2025)
- Called to Serve (2024)
- Manuscripts II (2023)
- Powerhouse (2022)
- Pulse (2018)
- Larsson in Brass (2018)
- Endeavour (2017)
- Celebrate the Season (2016)
- The Adventurers (2015)
- Heritage Series Vol. 7 – Music from the 1990s (2015)
- Inclusion (2014)
- Heritage Series Vol. 6 – Music from the 1980s (2014)
- Quest (2013)
- Heritage Series Vol. 5 – Music from the 1970s (2013)
- Heritage Series Vol. 4 – Music from the 1960s (2012)
- Fire in the Blood (2012)
- From the Heart (2012)
- Heritage Series Vol. 3 – Music from the 1950s (2011)
- Heritage Series Vol. 2 – Music from the 1940s (2010)
- Seize the Day (2010)
- So Glad! (2010)
- The Peter Graham Collection (2009)
- Heritage Series Vol. 1 – Music from the 1930s (2009)
- Daystar (2008)
- Together (2008)
- Supremacy (2007)
- Christmas Tidings (2006)
- St Magnus (2006)
- Origins (2005)
- Jubilee (2004)
- Shekinah (2004)
- The Kingdom Triumphant (2003)
- Glory Glory (2001)
- Renaissance (2000)
- Odyssey (1998)
- Manuscripts (1997)
- Partita (1996)
- Trumpet Call (1995)
- A Fanfare of Praise (1994)
- Blazon (1991)
- Perspectives (1990)
- The King's Crusader (1989)
- Goldcrest (1988)
- The Dawning (1987)
- The Valiant Heart (1983)
- ISB USA (1980)
- City Tempo (1977)
- Festival Salute (1975)
- Sounds Triumphant (1972)
- Golden Memories (1962)

A series of DVDs featuring the ISB has also been published.

== See also ==
- Salvation Army Band
- Household Troops Band
- Melbourne Staff Band
- International Staff Songsters
