= George Carpenter (Salvation Army) =

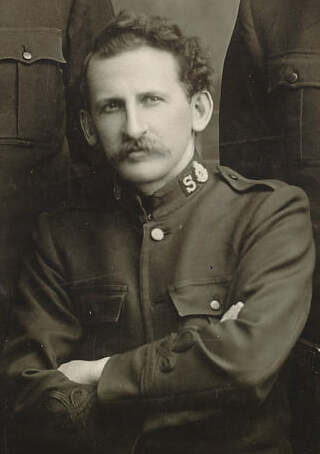
- Carpenter in December 1909

5th General of The Salvation Army
- In office 1 November 1939 – 21 June 1946
- Preceded by: Evangeline Booth
- Succeeded by: Albert Orsborn

Personal details
- Born: June 20, 1872 Millers Forest, Colony of New South Wales
- Died: 9 April 1948 (aged 75) Earlwood, New South Wales, Australia
- Spouse: Minnie Lindsay Rowell Carpenter

George Lyndon Carpenter (20 June 1872 – 9 April 1948) was an Australian writer who was the fifth General of The Salvation Army from 1939 to 1946.

== Biography ==
George Lyndon Carpenter was born in Millers Forest, New South Wales, on 20 June 1872. His father, Tristan de Acunha Carpenter, was a farmer and a Methodist. His mother, Hannah Carpenter, née Worboys, was English and a Salvationist. George was their only son; the couple had five daughters as well.

Carpenter trained in Raymond Terrace, Australia, and became an officer of the Army in 1892. For the first 18 years of his officership, he served in literary work in Australia, including editing the War Cry.

Carpenter and Ensign Minnie Rowell were married on 21 June 1899. She wrote books on Commissioner Lawley, Notable Officers of The Salvation Army and Women of the Flag.

In 1911, Carpenter was called to International Headquarters. He became the literary secretary of The Salvation Army under General Bramwell Booth. He served in this role until 1927. From 1927 to 1933, he returned for further service in Australia. He served there as Chief Secretary of Australia Eastern Territory. In 1933, he became South America East Territorial Commander. In 1937, he became Territorial Commander of Canada, and served at that post until he was elected General by the High Council in 1939.

Carpenter's term in office as the General of The Salvation Army was during the challenges of World War II. He retired as General on 21 June 1946.

Carpenter's books include Keep the Trumpets Sounding.

Carpenter died in Earlwood, New South Wales, on 9 April 1948, at the age of 75. He is buried in the Rookwood Cemetery.

== Family ==
He was married to Minnie and they had two children.

Preceded by Evangeline Booth	General of The Salvation Army; 1939–1946	Succeeded by Albert Orsborn
