= Salvation Army Sydney Congress Hall =

Sydney Congress Hall is a Salvation Army church situated in the Sydney's central business district. It is a facility of the Salvation Army, a Protestant Christian church and an international charitable organisation founded and headquartered in London, England. The Salvation Army refers to its churches as corps.

== Meetings ==
Sydney Congress Hall holds three worship services throughout the week – two on Sunday and one on Wednesday. Each service includes Bible readings, music, preaching, prayer and sharing.

== Music ==
Music has always played a significant role in the life of Sydney Congress Hall. Each Sunday Meeting involves various types of musical expression.

The band utilises a variety of brass instruments. The band supports the church in its worship, as well as undertaking various outreach activities. The band has released numerous CDs which are used in worship in many smaller Salvation Army churches.

The Songster Brigade is an 'adult choir' and is made up of men and women of all ages. They participate in Sunday meetings as an expression of and aid to worship. The Songsters have undertaken numerous tours of different parts of Australia, and have joined with other Songster groups on occasions, as part of a massed chorus and as a solo choir at events at the Sydney Opera House, and the Sydney Convention and Exhibition Centre.

Sydney Congress Hall Timbrel Brigade is used regularly in worship at the church as well as during outreach activities. This group uses the timbrel to express the joy of the Lord, as well as to attract attention in crowded spaces. They are regulars on the Sydney Anzac March, and are one of the last remaining Timbrel Brigades in New South Wales.

OnFire Big Band, a jazz ensemble, played all styles of big band jazz. OnFire's mission was to attract the jazz listening public of Australia to the message of Christ, and to enhance the worship experience within their own church (and the Australian church at large). The band played events such as the Manly Jazz Festival, the Youth in Swing concert series, and many concerts with James Morrison. During 2001, the Band toured the South Island of New Zealand. In 2003, OnFire had a guest spot on ABC Radio accompanying James Morrison. It had regular performances at the popular Sydney jazz club, The Basement. In 2000, the band released their self-titled debut album, In March 2002, they released a second album entitled Jazz with Heat and Direction and in 2007 they released their third album Unfinished Business.

Highest Praise, a contemporary vocal group, was active in the 1990s. The group was used both in meetings and for outreach into the Sydney community.

== See also ==
- The Salvation Army, Australia Eastern Territory
