= Salvation Army corps =

Local place of worship in the Salvation Army

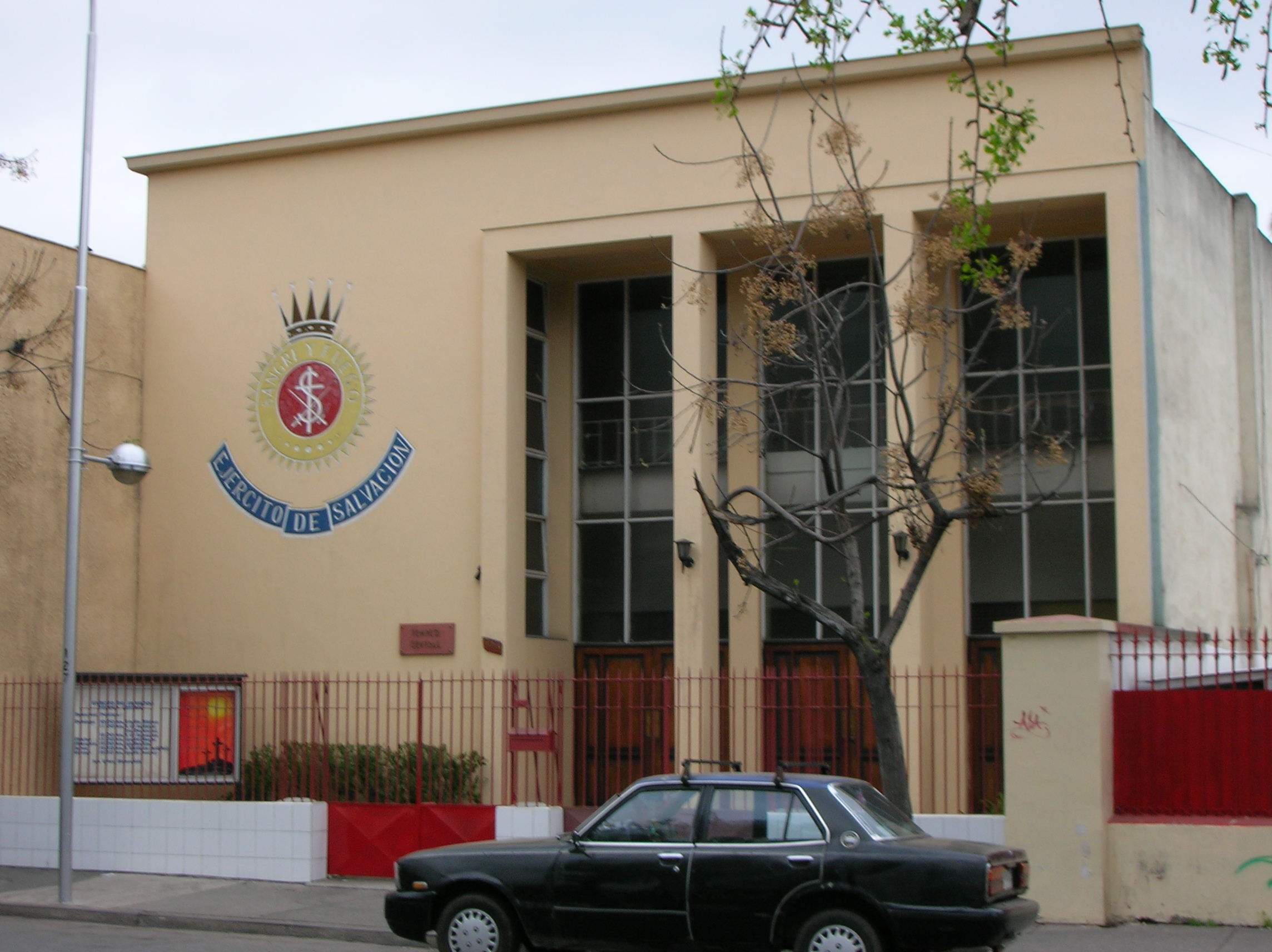
A typical Salvation Army corps in Chile

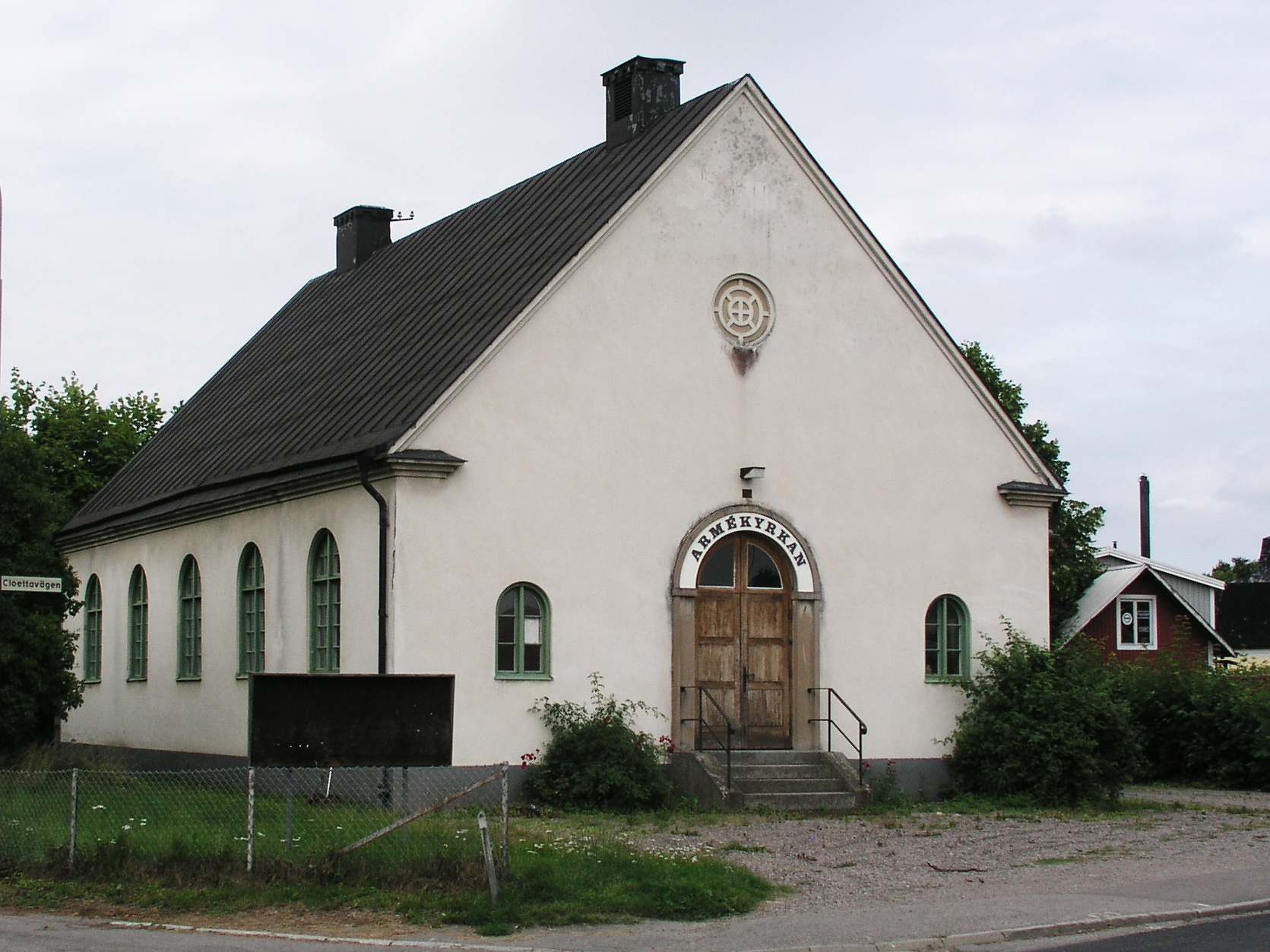
A Salvation Army corps in Sweden

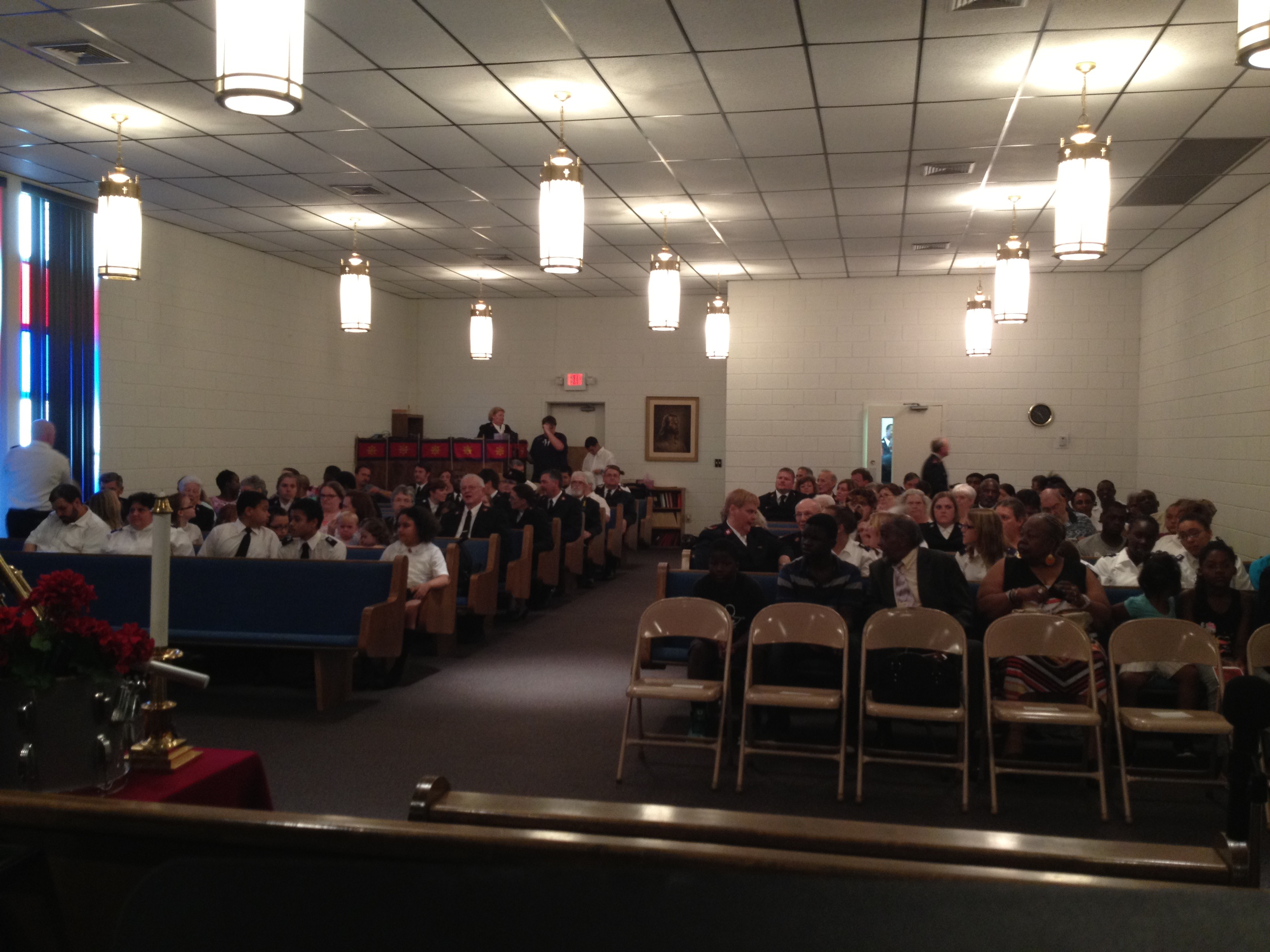
Soldier's Rally in Florence, South Carolina

A Salvation Army corps is a local church organization and physical place of worship in The Salvation Army. Like the Christian term "church", a corps includes both the physical building and the body of members who attend at the building. In keeping with Salvationist convention in using military terminology, corps are sometimes casually known as barracks. Traditionally many corps buildings are alternatively called temples or citadels, such as Openshaw Citadel. The Salvation Army also uses the more traditional term "church" for some local congregations and their buildings.

Corps are usually led by an officer or married officer couple, who fulfil the role of a pastor in other denominations. Officers in these positions are known as "Corps Officers" or COs, and are generally Lieutenants, Captains or Majors. Terms for Officers vary in each country and often serve a term from as little as six months to 10 years. Appointments are decided on by the countries Territorial or Regional Headquarters.

== See also ==
- List of Salvation Army corps in the United Kingdom in 1900
