= John Maines =

John Maines (born 10 December 1948) is a musician, trombone player and active figure in the British brass band movement as a performer, conductor, tutor, compere and concert presenter.

== Biography ==
Maines was born in Warrington on 10 December 1948. He was raised in Winwick, Lancashire and later Newton-le-Willows, Lancashire. After initial lessons from his father, his early musical career started as a tenor horn player with the Prescot Cables Band near St. Helens. After a move to trombone he joined the Wigan Boys Club and Cammell Laird band in Birkenhead, Cheshire. As a young player he became the North of England Junior Solo Champion and was invited to play for the National Youth Brass Band of Great Britain. A move to Cornwall saw John as principal trombone with St. Austell and Bodmin bands where he achieved a succession of competition victories at solo competitions throughout the South West of England. It was at this time that he gained the title of Champion Trombone Player of Great Britain on three successive occasions. He is one of only two players ever to achieve a hat-trick in this event.

After playing solo trombone with the Stanshawe (Bristol) and Fairey Engineering bands with whom he also held the post of principal trombone with Harry Mortimer's Men o' Brass, he became principal trombone with the Black Dyke Mills Band. With this band he won competition titles including a hat trick of European Championships and toured such countries as the Netherlands, Switzerland, Spain and Japan.

Since 1979 he has been a music tutor for the National Youth Brass Band of Great Britain and is a Council member of the same organisation.

Maines is a member of the National Association of Brass Band Adjudicators and regularly adjudicates both at home and abroad. He travels in Europe taking him to such places as Belgium, the Netherlands, Luxembourg and Denmark where he has taken part in various musical activities including the direction of the National Youth Band of Denmark. Maines' academic work saw him graduate from the University of Sheffield with a BA (Hons) Degree.

Maines is active as a conductor in the UK directing different bands, as well as undertaking the role of Master of Ceremonies at many of the country's band events such as The National Youth Band Championships, The Great Northern Brass Arts Festival, The Harry Mortimer Centenary Concert and acting as compere for many bands such as Black Dyke, Fairey's, Grimethorpe Colliery, Foden's, Brighouse & Rastrick, Wingates, Leyland, BAYV Cory and Yorkshire Building Society.

Maines was for a time the Musical Director of the James Shepherd Versatile Brass group with whom he travelled extensively.

Maines is a writer for various music publications, and has taken part in many recordings for CD, Radio and Television. In addition to his everyday banding activities Maines was for many years the presenter of the long running BBC weekly band programme "GMR Brass" and in 1999 received the Manchester Music Makers award for his contribution to music broadcasting in the Greater Manchester area. He is now the presenter of World of Brass Radio on www.worldofbrass.com, an internet based programme of brass music.
