= Dublin Silver Band =

British brass band

The Dublin Silver Band is a traditional British brass band based out of Dublin, Ohio as one of the four Dublin Community Bands, a 501(c)(3) arts organization. It was created by former Ohio State University Marching Band director Dr. Paul Droste and tuba player Dr. Patrick Herak as the Ohio Brass Band in 2008 as a way for high-level non-professional musicians to preserve the British brass band style of music in central Ohio. The name was changed upon joining the Dublin Community Bands.

The band is directed by Tim Jameson, father of euphonium player Grant Jameson and aspiring composer Joshua Tyler Jameson. The band follows the rich British brass band tradition of competition against other brass bands year-round, in various types of contests such as the North American Brass Band Association Championships, a technical contest in late winter to early spring, the Ohio Brass Arts Festival in early summer, and the US Open Brass Band Championships, an entertainment-style contest in mid-autumn.

By having won the 2015 US Open Brass Band Championship, the Dublin Silver Band received and invitation to compete at the 40th annual Brass In Concert Championship in Newcastle upon Tyne among world-renowned championship groups such as the Carlton Main Frickley Colliery Band, Brass Band Schoonhoven, Virtuosi GUS Band, and the Flowers Brass Band. In representing the US abroad, the group has performed with the Dublin Concert Band, as well as served as ambassadors of the musical style to children of the St. Helen's Youth Brass Band and to the small mining town of Bowburn.
