= British brass band =

Type of musical ensemble

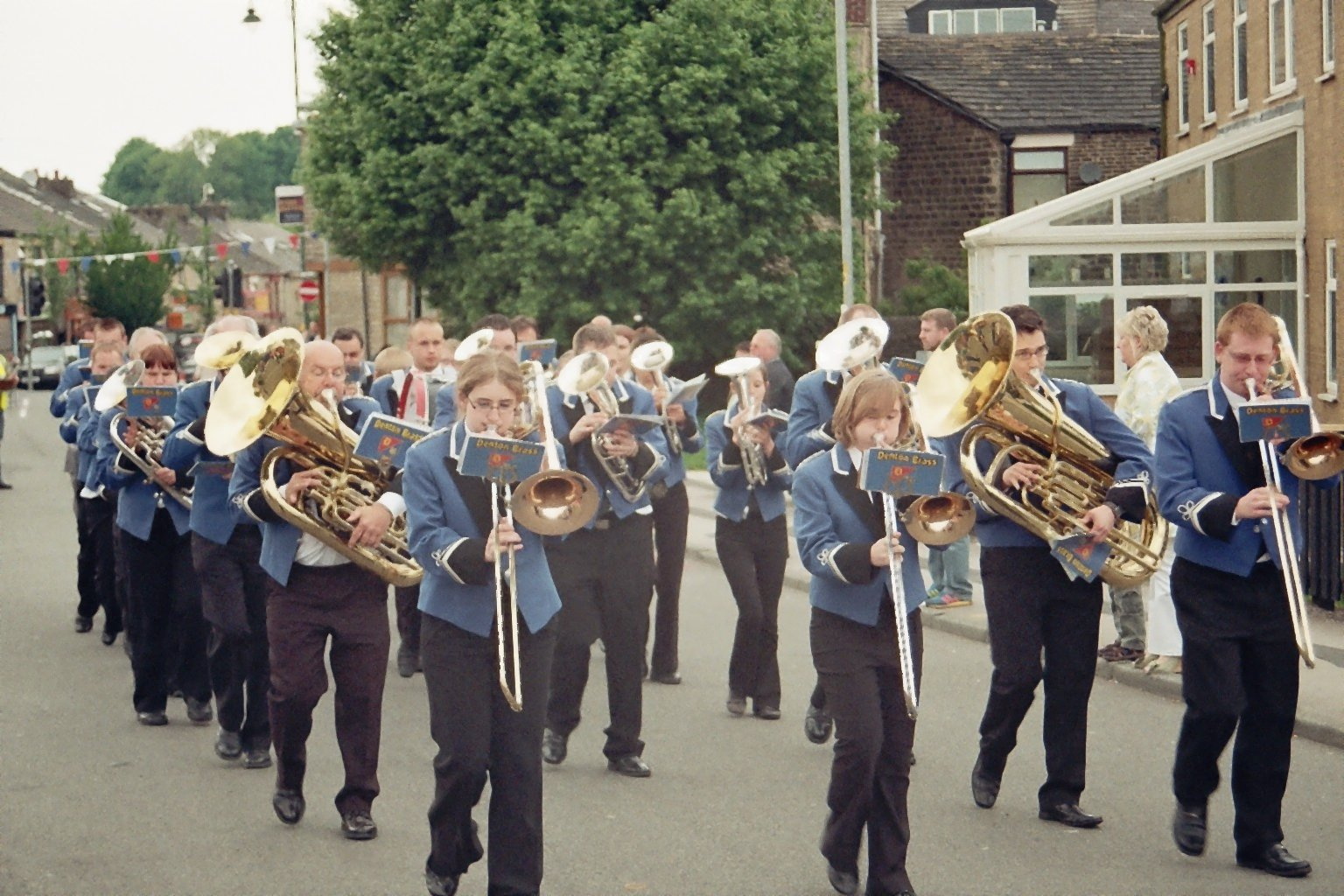
Marching brass band, Denton, Lancashire, 2008

Groes Wen - The Trefor Brass Band
Groes-wen - A track by The Trefor Brass Band. From the 1997 album Seindorf Trefor (The Trefor Brass Band From Wales)

In Britain, a brass band (known regionally as a silver band or colliery band) is a musical ensemble comprising a standardized range of brass and percussion instruments. The modern form of the brass band in the United Kingdom dates back to the 19th century, with a vibrant tradition of competition based around communities and local industry, with colliery bands being particularly notable. The Stalybridge Old Band, for example, first performed in 1815 and is still in existence, although it did not become a brass band until the 1840s.

Bands using the British instrumentation are the most common form of brass band in the United Kingdom, Australia and New Zealand, and are also widespread in continental Europe, Japan and North America. The tradition for brass bands in the UK is continuing, and local communities and schools have brass bands. British band contests are highly competitive, with bands organized into five sections much like a football league. Competitions are held throughout the year at local, regional, and national levels, and at the end of each year there are promotions and relegations.

A selection of brass bands can be experienced at the annual Durham Miners' Gala. There are also hotly-contested annual events held on Whit Friday in the Saddleworth area of Greater Manchester in which hundreds of bands compete.

== Etymology ==
The terms brass band and silver band are synonymous in that the vast majority of bands termed either brass or silver incorporate musicians playing a mix of lacquered brass and silver-plated instruments. However, in the days when plain or lacquered brass instruments were not as costly as silver-plated ones, the term silver band implied an ensemble that could afford the latter and were thus perceived to be more successful. With the cost of each type now being similar, the distinction between brass and silver bands is generally not made. There are, however, some brass bands which carried the name silver prize band as a result of their successes in contests and competitions. As time went on, some kept the name silver but not necessarily the instruments. Nowadays, the only real difference is that silver bands are located mainly in the south of England and brass bands in the north, although some silver bands do still exist in the North and many brass bands exist in the South.

== Instrumentation ==
British brass bands are limited to specific instruments, excluding, for instance, trumpets and French horns, which are found in orchestras and concert bands.

The standard instrumentation is as follows:

- 1 soprano cornet (E♭)
- 9 cornets (B♭) –
  - Front row: one principal cornet, three solo cornets
  - Back row: one repiano (ripieno) cornet, two 2nd cornets, two 3rd cornets
- 1 flugelhorn (B♭)
- 3 tenor horns (E♭) called alto horn in many countries – solo, 1st, 2nd
- 2 baritone horns (B♭) – 1st, 2nd
- 2 tenor trombones (B♭) – 1st, 2nd
- 1 bass trombone (B♭)
- 2 euphoniums (B♭)
- 2 E♭ basses, also known as E♭ tubas
- 2 B♭ basses, also known as B♭ tubas
- 2 to 4 percussion

The above totals 27–29 players, although in practice a band often has fewer than this. Spare seats may be filled for concerts and contests by players brought in from other bands, commonly known as deputising players or deps.

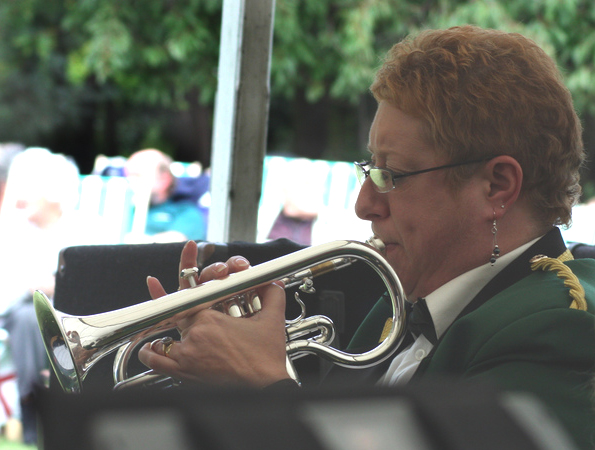
Soprano cornet

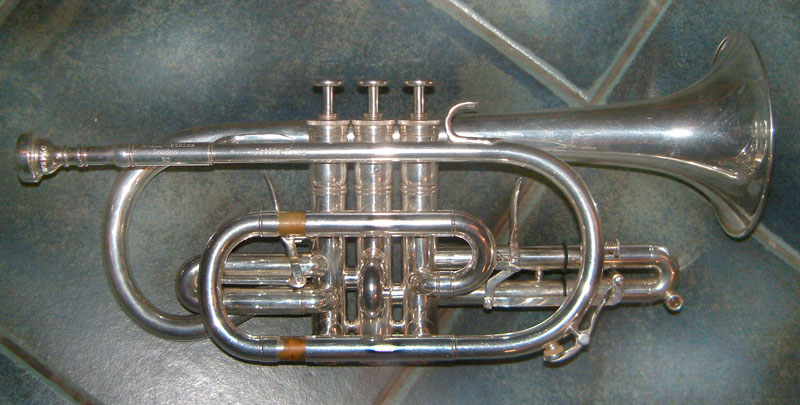
Cornet

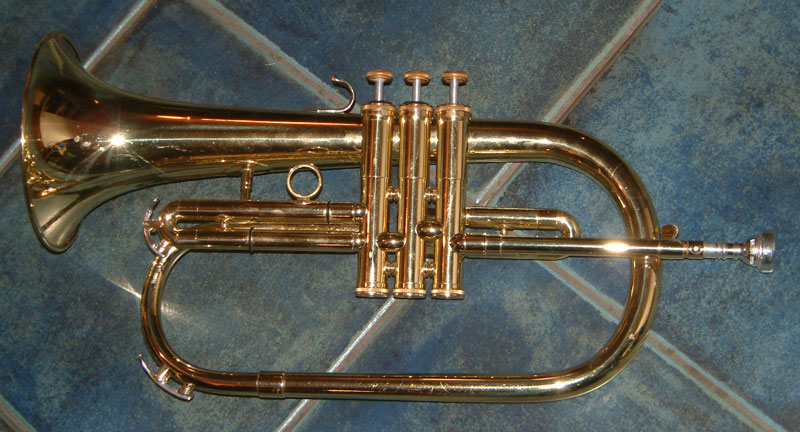
Flugelhorn

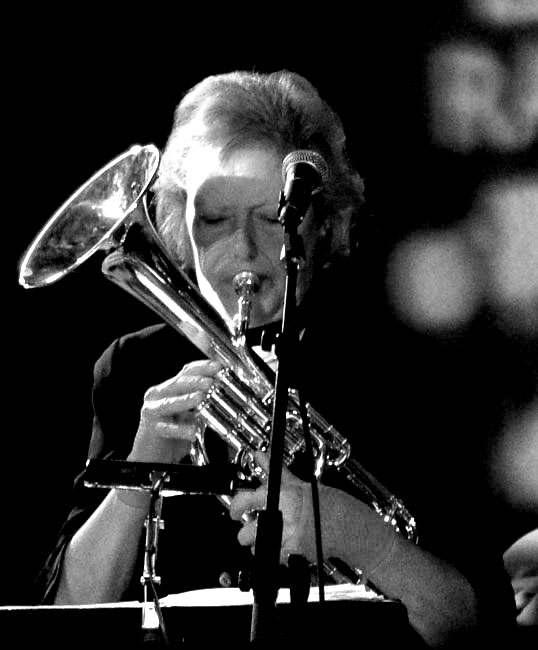
Tenor Horn

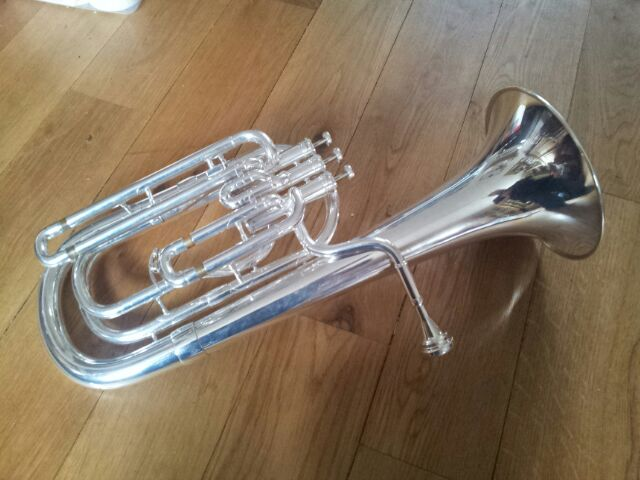
Baritone horn

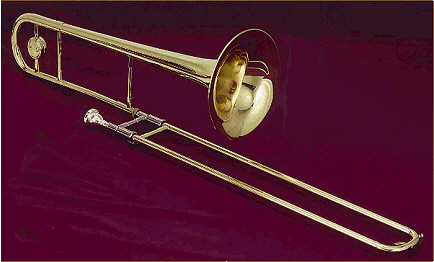
Tenor trombone

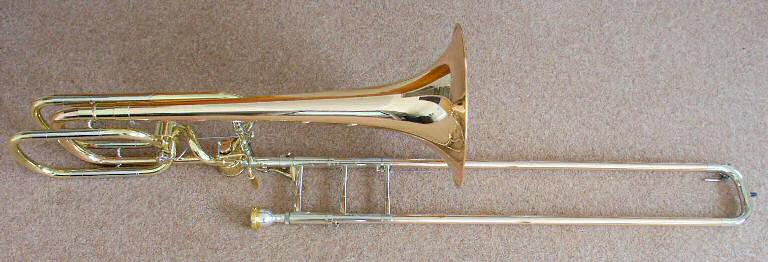
Bass trombone

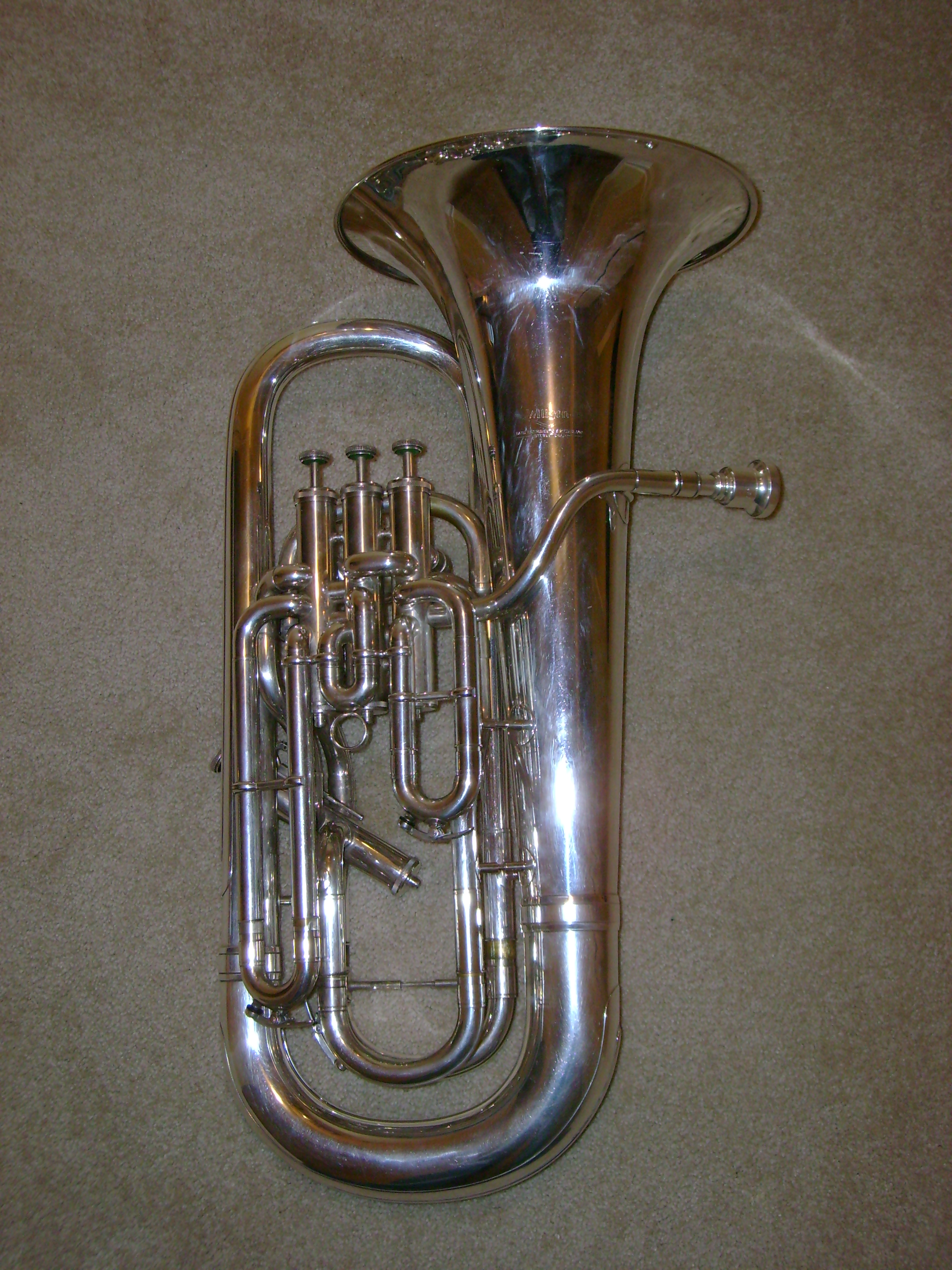
Euphonium

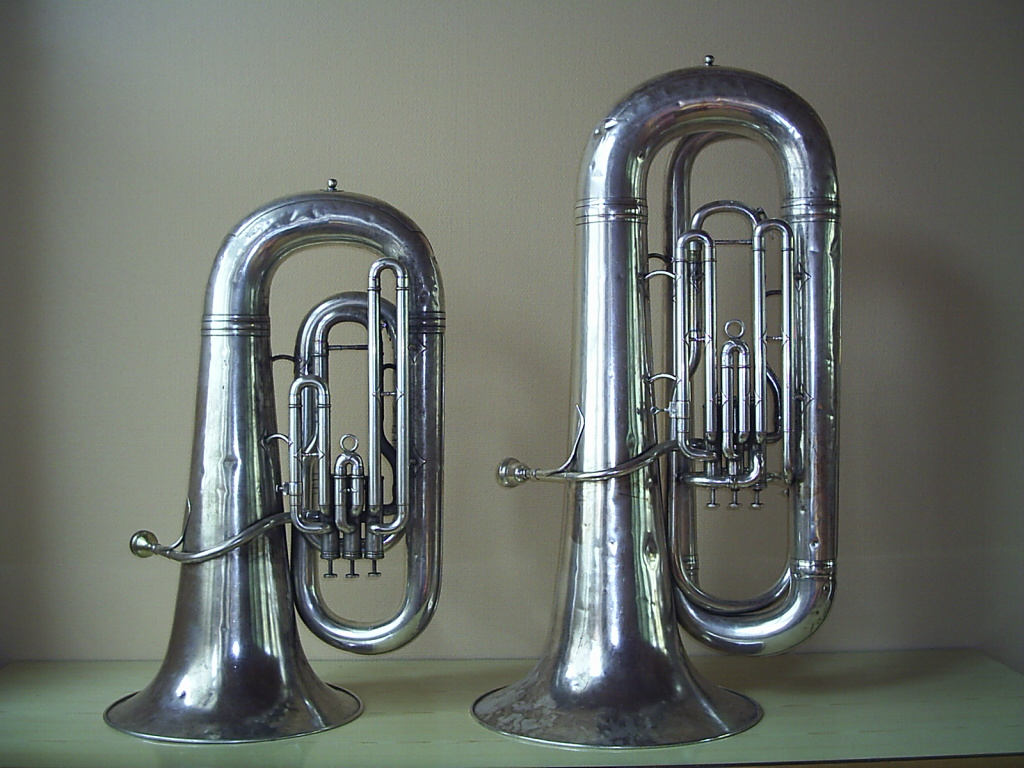
E♭ and B♭ Tubas

=== Notation ===
With the exception of percussion, bass trombone and some older tenor trombone music, all parts are transposing and written in the treble clef with the instrument's lowest open note (B♭ or E♭) notated as middle C. This means that for every valved instrument, from the basses to the soprano cornet, a given note on the stave corresponds to the same valve fingering, enabling players to move more easily between parts. This system is unique to UK-style brass bands, though historically the North American drum and bugle corps activity followed the brass band convention of all-treble-clef writing.

Tenor trombone music is usually in treble clef like the other instruments in the band, though older scores or marches sometimes use tenor clef.

Bass trombone music is written at concert pitch in bass clef. This was historically due to this part being taken by a G bass trombone, rather than the modern B♭ bass trombone. As instrument technology modernized, the need for a bass trombone in G diminished, with the introduction of the B♭ bass trombone with F rotary valve. The larger bore and open wrap of the F valve gave the B♭ bass trombone a lower available playing register than the straight G bass trombone.

Tuned percussion is written in concert pitch (with the appropriate octave transpositions) with the appropriate clef for the instrument – e.g. bass clef for timpani, treble clef for glockenspiel (sounding two octaves higher). Unpitched percussion parts (including drum kit) are written in neutral clef on a 1- to 5-line stave using standard percussion notation, though some older scores may use bass and/or treble clefs.

== United Kingdom ==
=== History ===
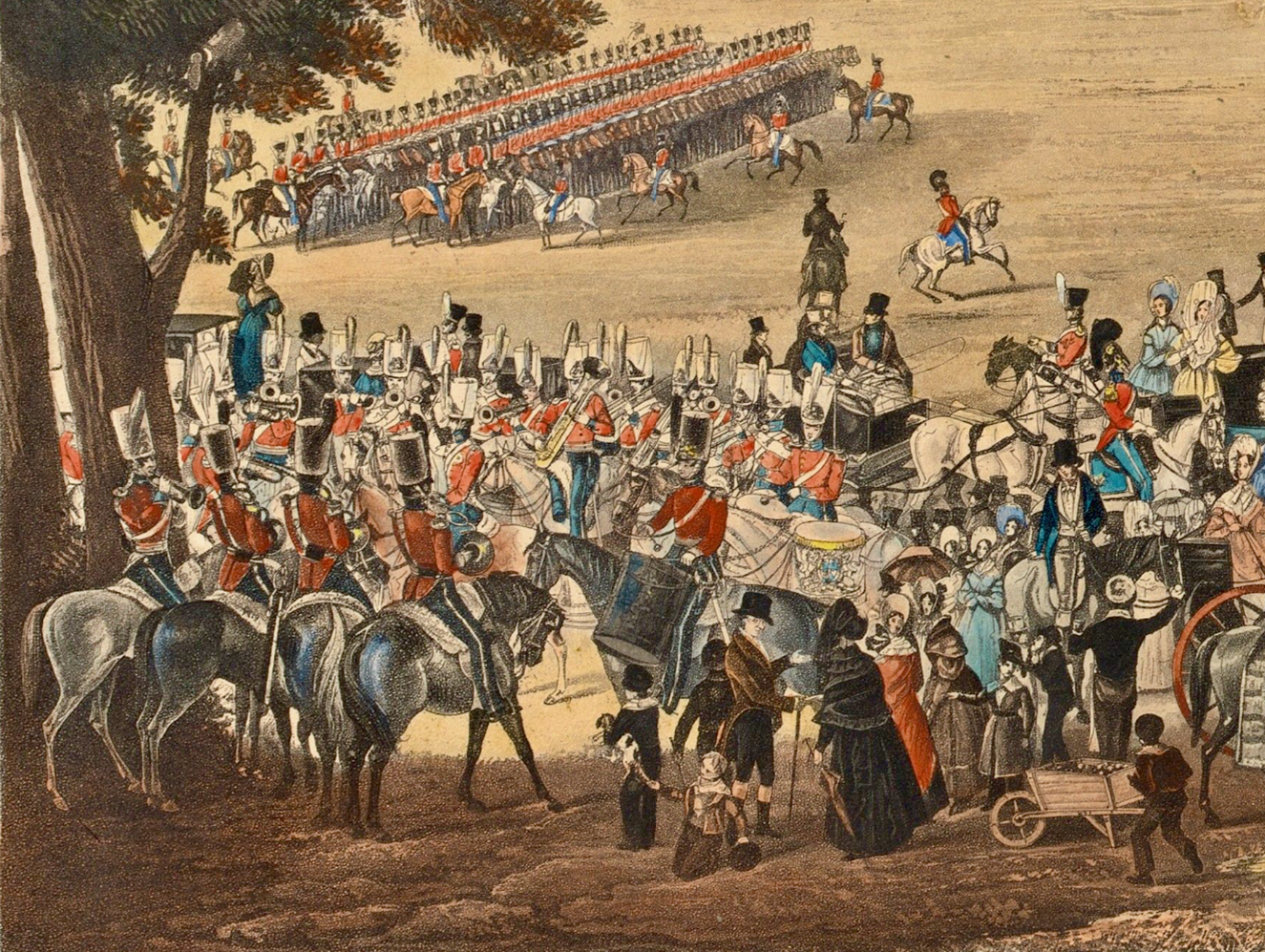
The mounted brass band of the Worcestershire Yeomanry at an 1838 review.

The rise of brass bands in nineteenth-century Britain owed much to industrialisation, armed conflict, and improvements to instrument designs. Village and church ensembles had existed in the eighteenth century, while military bands, which featured a mix of woodwind, brass, and percussion instruments, proliferated during the Napoleonic Wars. The British Army began experimenting with all-brass bands from the late 1810s; the first civilian brass bands, featuring instruments such as keyed bugles, trumpets and trombones, emerged by the end of the 1820s. These early brass ensembles were often organised by former regimental musicians: the Waterloo veteran James Sanderson led a 'military brass band' in Leamington Spa and Warwick in 1829.

Wind and brass bands enjoyed the support of industrial employers who sponsored bands to promote discipline, community spirit, and temperance among their workers. The advent of Adolphe Sax's valved brass designs, which were easier to play and produced a more accurate, consistent sound, also helped fuel the growth of the brass band movement from the 1840s. Arguably brass bands were an expression of the local solidarity and aspirations of newly formed or rapidly growing communities. This was seen, for instance, in the creation of large-scale brass band competitions by the late 1850s. In 1853 John Jennison, owner of Belle Vue Zoological Gardens in Manchester, agreed to stage the first British open brass band championships. The event was attended by a crowd of over 16,000 and continued annually until 1981. Brass bands reached their peak in the 1890s, when there were around 5,000 brass bands in the country. Today, there are 1,200 brass bands in Britain with around 30,000 players.

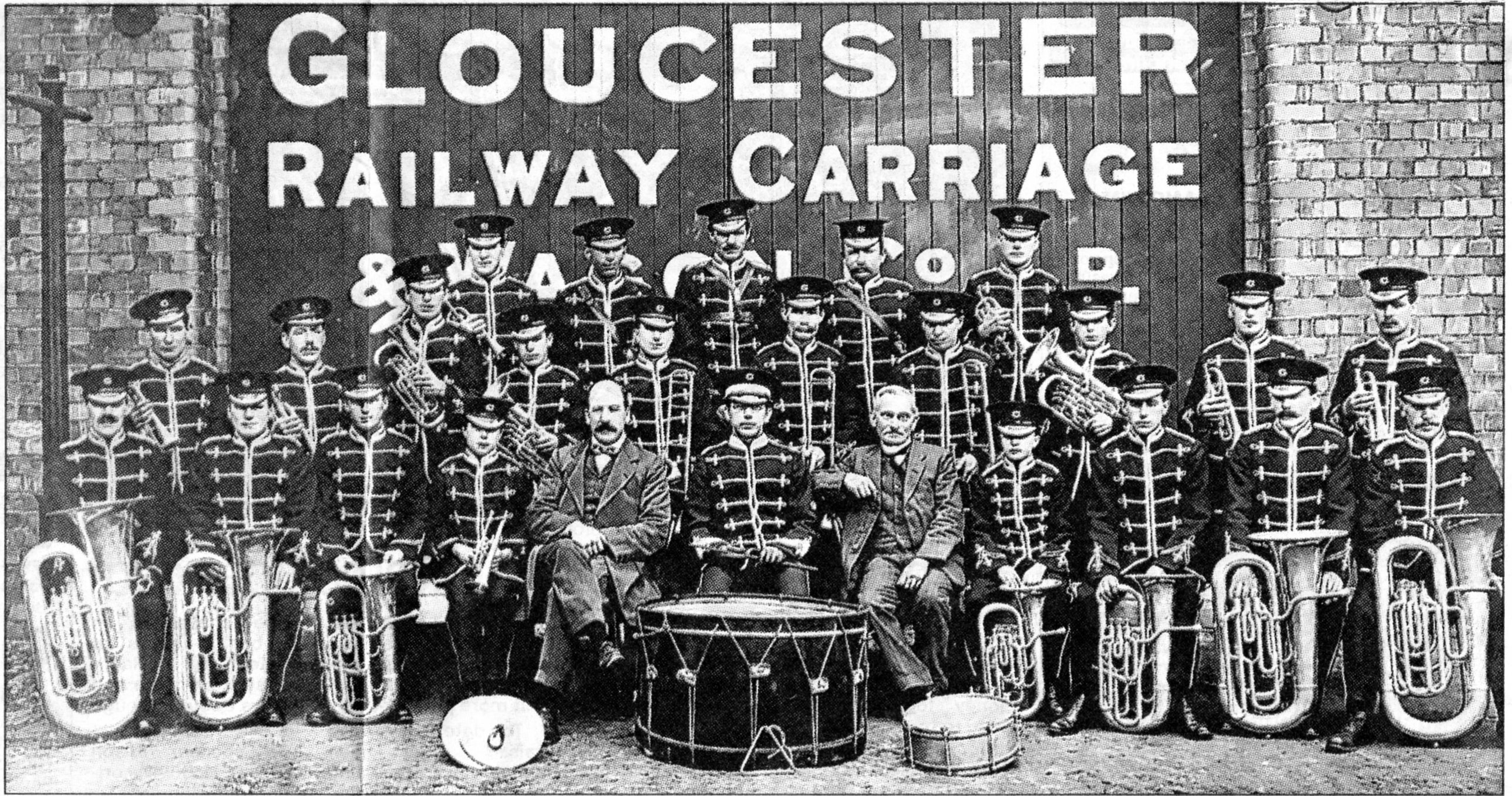
Gloucester Railway Carriage & Wagon Company Band, 1916. Collieries and factories often sponsored their own works bands, and many now-defunct companies survive only in the names of their former bands.

Many British bands were originally either works bands or sponsored by various industrial concerns. This was particularly evident in coal mining areas, for example, bands such as the Grimethorpe Colliery Band and Carlton Main Frickley Colliery Band in Yorkshire. Bands sponsored by factories include The Black Dyke Mills Band, Yorkshire Imperial Band (originally the Yorkshire Copperworks Band), Foden's sponsored by the truck manufacturer, Fairey sponsored by the aircraft manufacturer, and Leyland Band sponsored by the vehicle manufacturer. One of the reasons for this was to keep the workers from organizing in radical groups. With the decline of these industries several bands have dissolved and others now draw their membership from other industries and other parts of the community. The Brighouse and Rastrick Band, is unique in having operated continually at the highest level without sponsorship, drawing its income from regular concerts, public donations and sales of recordings and merchandise.

The leading bands in Wales include the Cory Band, Tredegar Town Band and Tongwynlais Temperance Band The leading bands in Scotland are The Cooperation Band (formally Co-operative Funeralcare), Whitburn Band and the Kirkintilloch Band. All these bands compete at the highest level in the banding movement. In Northern Ireland the Brass Band League currently has 26 members.

Brass banding across the generations

There are also many non-contesting or 'community' brass bands in the UK providing entertainment for audiences and enjoyment for musicians of all ages.

=== Contesting in the United Kingdom ===
British banding is highly competitive, with bands organized into five sections much like a football league – Championship section, 1st section, 2nd section, 3rd section and 4th section. Competitions are held throughout the year at local, regional, and national levels, and at the end of each year there are promotions and relegations.

At a national level the main contest is the National Brass Band Championship, and this determines a band's section. For this, the UK is split into 8 regions: London and Southern Counties, Midlands, North of England, North West, Scotland, Wales, West of England, and Yorkshire. Each year in Spring the bands compete in a regional contest for their section, and the top two or three in each section go on to the "National Finals" in Autumn. As of 2025, the finals for Sections 1 to 4 are held at The Centaur at Cheltenham Racecourse, and the finals for the Championship Section at the Royal Albert Hall in London (as featured in the film Brassed Off). From 2026, the finals for Sections 1 to 4 are moving to the York Barbican.

The bands are awarded points for their result at the annual regional championships (1st gets 1 point, 9th gets 9 points), and this is added to the previous two years to give a three-year total. Two or three bands with the best total are promoted, and two or three bands are relegated. Promotion and relegation are managed on a regional level with bands promoted and relegated within their regional league tables.

There are also separate contests for university brass bands, including the annual UniBrass contest, founded at Lancaster University in 2010 and hosted in 2025 by the University of Cardiff. The Cambridge and Oxford University brass bands also compete against each other in annual 'varsity' contests. The National Youth Band Brass Championships held annually has a Youth Champs' non-competitive section offering the opportunity for young people new to brass to take part and contribute a performance without the pressure of competition.

== The Salvation Army ==
In the UK, the brass bands of The Salvation Army have run parallel to the main brass band movement since the 1870s. Bands of The Salvation Army range from small church bands to staff bands composed of the best bandsmen of The Salvation Army in the area. Their instrumentation is almost identical except for a minor difference in the cornet section whereby the repiano is dropped and the remainder of the row is made up of parts designated 1st and 2nd (two players each) rather than 2nd and 3rd; and that some major pieces have a split first trombone part, the lower part usually cued elsewhere in the band. Bands of The Salvation Army can be found in most countries around the world in which it operates.

== Australia ==
The Australian derivation of a brass band is the same as the UK brass band (i.e. standard instrumentation with no woodwind). Contesting bands in Australia are graded from A Grade to D Grade. National Contests are held each year at Easter, with the location moving from state to state, and often including bands from New Zealand or other locations around the Asia Pacific region.

Each state also conducts their own championships. National and state contests are generally of the same format: a set test piece for each grade, a hymn, an own choice, a stage march (march or concert march performed on the stage without marching) and a light entertainment concert program. Smaller regional contests often replace the major works with an own choice concert program.

Among the country's most famous brass band identities have been conductor and composer Percy Code; and David King and Frank Wright who made their mark in Britain. Early Australian brass composers include Thomas Bulch, Alex Lithgow and Charles Trussell. In later years, leading composers have included Brenton Broadstock ("Winds of Change", "Rutherford Variations", "Valiant Take All My Sins Away" and many more), Barrie Gott ("Mumbo Jumbo", "Gospel Train", "Glasshouse Sketches") and Joe Cook ("Taskforce", "Keighley Moor").

== Europe ==
=== Belgium ===
In Belgium, there are about 30 brass bands. The best known is Brass Band Willebroek, who were crowned European Brass Band Champions in 1993, 2006, 2007 and 2025 with all wins coming under the leadership of Frans Violet. The average banding level is still rising, as the brass movement was only introduced in Belgium some 30 years ago.

The national brass band Championships are held annually at CC Zwanenberg in Heist-Op-Den-Berg. The winner represents Belgium at the European Championships.

Participants are divided into four categories going from Championship section to third section. Currently there are seven bands competing in Championship section. These are: Brass Band Willebroek Brass Band Buizingen, Metropole Brass Band, Festival Brass Band, Kortrijk Brass Band, Brass Band Heist, and De Noord-Limburgse Brassband,

Other Belgian bands include: Mercator Brassband, Brassband Kempenzonen Tielen, Brass Band Leieland, Brass Band Zele, Brass Band De Kempengalm, Brass Band de Thudinie and many more.

Some of the brass bands in Belgium are primarily based around recreational music, do not conform to British brass band instrumentation, and therefore do not compete.

=== Germany ===
[[:File:March brass band playing parading by.ogg|]]

Austrian brass band

Brass bands in Germany are not as widespread as in other European countries like Switzerland or the Netherlands. There are just a few bands (about 40) playing in authentic British instrumentation. This is primarily due to the popularity of wind bands, particularly in Southern Germany, and brass groups (composed of soprano to bass instruments) known as "Posaunenchöre" (trombone choirs) related to churches.

National Brass Band "competitions" took place as part of the German Festival of Wind Music in Würzburg 2007 and 2008, in Duisburg 2010, in Coesfeld 2012 and in Bad Kissingen 2014.

=== Ireland ===
Brass bands in Ireland can primarily trace their origins to the past influence of British Army bands during the period between 1801 and 1922. As well as military bands however, community led groups were also in existence around this time. While concert bands are more prevalent today, possibly due to the association of brass bands with British rule, brass bands are still popular, especially on the east coast. Dungarvan, Arklow and Drogheda are all examples of towns with brass bands of note. Dublin has a number of Brass Bands. The oldest is the Blanchardstown Brass Band (Blanchardstown) formed in 1826, St.Georges Brass Band Formed 1936 (in Dublin City Centre) and the Stedfast Brass Band (Blackrock) Brass competitions take place annually, both regionally and nationally.

=== Netherlands ===
In the years 1870–1900 the Salvation Army spread out their missionary activities in the Netherlands, at first the main port city Amsterdam, and then to the then still important northern seaport of Harlingen, Friesland around the 1900.

Brass Band contesting began in Friesland after World War II. The Frisian conductor Sierd de Boer made a great effort to develop the British Brass Band standardisation, and the Frisians nowadays continue to set the standard of brass bands in the Netherlands. Brass Bands in Friesland include "De Wâldsang" Buitenpost, "Pro Rege" Heerenveen, "De Bazuin" Oenkerk and "De Spijkerpakkenband" Opsterland. Other well known brass bands across the country are Brassband Rijnmond (Rotterdam) and Brass Band Schoonhoven.

=== Norway ===
The Norwegian Band Federation is the largest voluntary music organisation in Norway. Through their membership, the 1712 member bands with their 70,318 players (official figures as of 9/1/04) are offered good conditions for their hobby. A network rich in tradition also gives them a strong and influential position in the cultural life of Norway. Many primary schools have their own bands.

Leading Norwegian brass bands include Eikanger-Bjørsvik Musikklag, Manger Musikklag, Stavanger Brass Band, Jaren Hornmusikkforening and Oslofjord Brass, all of which compete in the elite level of the Norwegian national brass band contest.

Crown Prince Haakon is the patron of the Norwegian Band Federation. The Federation is granted an annual audience with the Crown Prince in order to report to him and receive advice for the future. The King has awarded a royal trophy to the championships for adult bands.

== North and South America ==
=== Canada ===
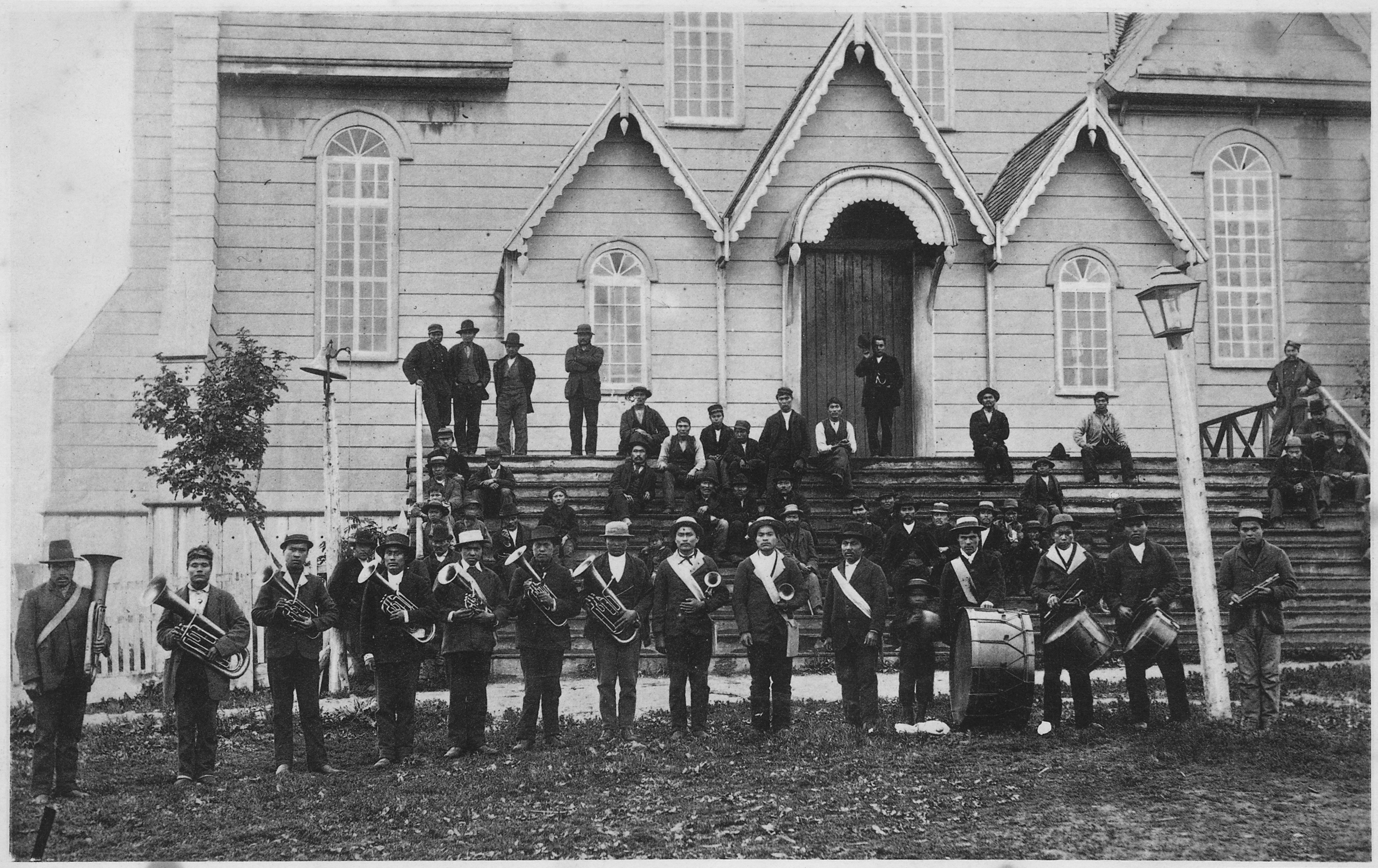
Metlakahtla Brass Band. Metlakahtla Church, British Columbia.

Brass bands in the British tradition, sometimes sponsored by employers, existed in Canada in the late 19th and early 20th centuries. The geography of Canada (e.g. large distances between communities, making regular contests and migration of players difficult) was a key factor among many challenges that led to the demise of most such bands.

Today, excepting the Salvation Army bands, there are few British-style brass bands in Canada. Most operate as recreational, amateur, "community" bands such as the Oshawa Civic Band, King Street Brass from Kitchener, and the Whitby Brass Band, who celebrated their 160th anniversary in 2023. There are some semi-professional groups, like the Intrada Brass of Oakville, Ontario and the Weston Silver Band of Toronto. One of the most successful brass bands in Canada is the Hannaford Street Silver Band.

There are hopes for growth in the education field of brass bands in Canada, and in particular southern Ontario. In 1999, the professional Hannaford Street Silver Band launched the Hannaford Street Youth Band, which is internationally recognized for its success. In 2005, another youth band was created for beginning brass players known as the Hannaford Junior Band. Beginning in September 2006, the Hannaford organization plans to launch a third, intermediate, band known as the Hannaford Community Youth Band. These three ensembles target a wide range of youth from ages 11 to people well into their twenties.

=== Latin America ===
Brass bands long enjoyed popularity in many parts of Latin America as well.

Mexican banda music has similar origins to the British brass band tradition and was influenced by it in its early days. In 19th century Mexico very large bands were formed, such as that of composer Juventino Rosas and in parts of Mexico brass band concerts remain a popular entertainment.

=== United States ===
Dance to the Spirits of Fire - Stellar Brass - United States Air Force Academy Band

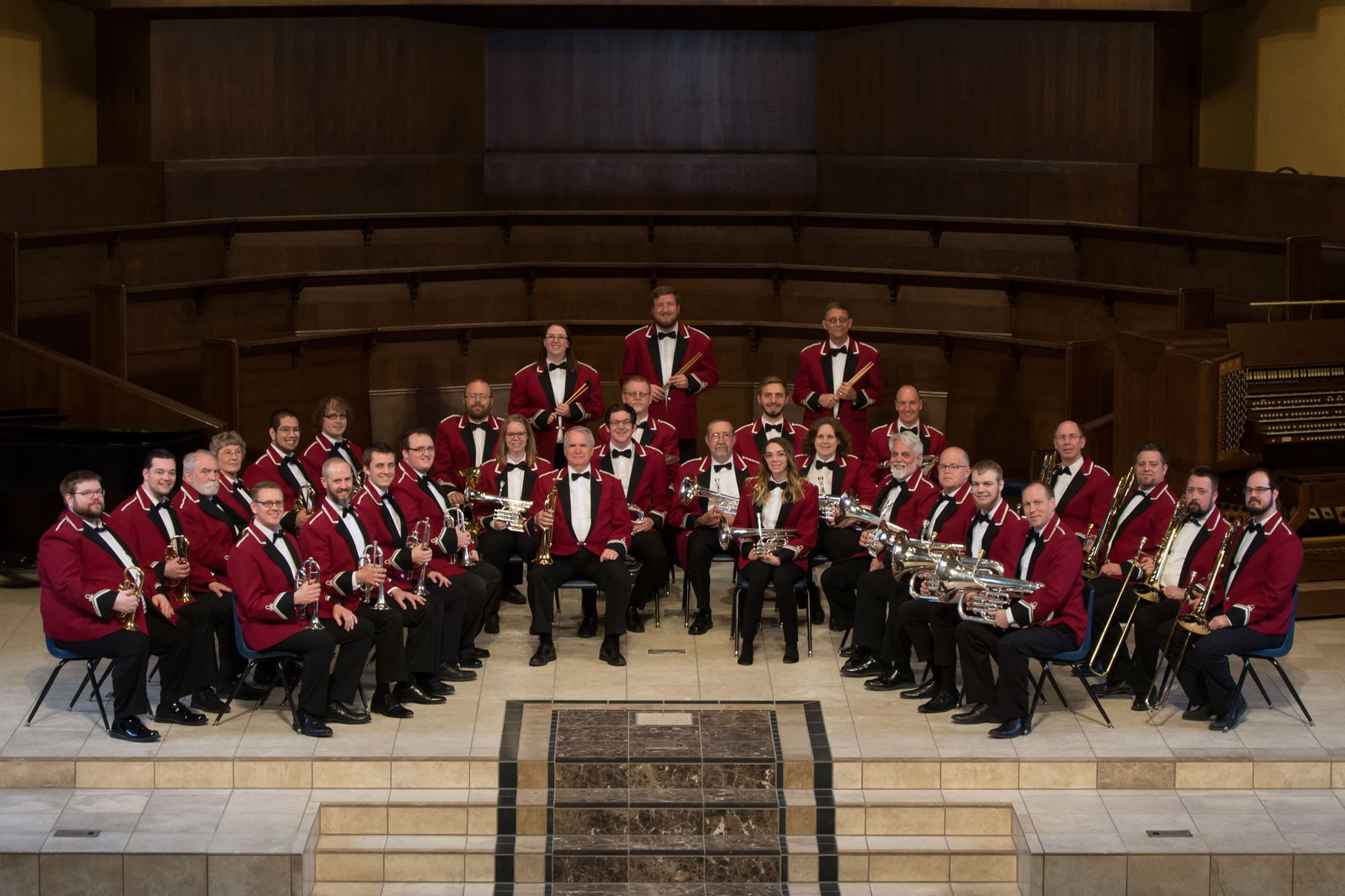
Nebraska Brass Band 2018

Brass bands in the British tradition are becoming more popular through the efforts of the North American Brass Band Association (NABBA), which organizes an annual brass band convention and set piece style contest. The US Open Brass Band Championships are held in early November and serves as the countries leading entertainment competition. Brass Band Festivals such as The Great American Brass Festival, Ohio Brass Arts Festival, Gettysburg Brass Band Festival, Dublin Festival of Brass, Mid-Atlantic Brass Festival, and Texas Brass Fest occur throughout the year.

Brass bands were very popular throughout the United States in the late 19th century and the early decades of the 20th century. Well known bands of virtuoso musicians toured widely, and most towns had their own bands that put on weekend music concerts. One notable example of this was The Ohio State University Marching Band which formed in 1879 and still performs with only brass and percussion instruments. Other groups, ranging from benevolent societies to large factories, would often have a band. The brass band movement has undergone a resurgence in the late twentieth century, led by the North American Brass Band Association. The United States boasts two professional brass bands, the Brass Band of Battle Creek and the River City Brass Band, as well as community brass bands such as the Dallas Brass Band, Central Ohio Brass Band, Dublin Silver Band, Brass Band of the Western Reserve, Motor City Brass Band, Atlantic Brass Band, Nebraska Brass Band, Imperial Brass, The Chesapeake Silver Cornet Brass Band (Delaware), Five Lakes Silver Band, Allegheny Brass Band, The Brass Band of Central Florida, the Sheldon Theatre Brass Band (Red Wing, MN), the Lake Wobegon Brass Band (Anoka, MN), the Twin Cities Brass Band (Bloomington, MN), the Fountain City Brass Band, the Triangle Brass Band, the Smoky Mountain Brass Band the River Brass, the Mission Peak Brass Band (Fremont, CA), the Cherry Blossom Brass Band (Washington, DC), and the Rockville Brass Band (the oldest continously operating and competing band in the US, founded in 1976); several collegiate brass bands, including the James Madison University Brass Band, the Mansfield University Brass Band, the Slippery Rock University Brass Ensemble, the Pennwest-Clarion University Brass Ensemble, and the University of Georgia British Brass Band; and various youth brass bands, including the Triangle Youth Brass Band and the Fountain City Youth Brass Bands also exist.

== Repertoire ==
There are several notable composers in the brass band world. The current favourite is possibly Philip Sparke, who has written many pieces, including Music of the Spheres. A noted Welsh Composer was T. J. (Tom) Powell, born in Tredegar in 1897, also known as "The Welsh Sousa". Powell composed over 500 pieces for brass bands, including marches (such as "The Castle Marches"), tone poems and suites.

Other notable composers include:

- Torstein Aagaard-Nilsen
- Eric Ball
- Brenton Broadstock
- Thierry Deleruyelle
- Kenneth Downie
- Martin Ellerby
- Percy Fletcher
- Goff Richards
- Dean Goffin
- Peter Graham
- Elgar Howarth
- Gordon Jacob
- Gordon Langford
- Henry James Metcalfe
- William Rimmer
- Philip Sparke
- Ray Steadman-Allen
- Gilbert Vinter
- Paul Lovatt-Cooper

Several classical composers have written music specifically for brass band. These include:

- Malcolm Arnold: Little Suite for Brass, Fantasy for Brass Band, Four Cornish Dances
- Granville Bantock: Prometheus Unbound
- Judith Bingham: Prague
- Harrison Birtwistle: Grimethorpe Aria
- Arthur Bliss: Kenilworth
- Derek Bourgeois: Blitz, Concertos Nos. 1 & 2 for Brass Band, Concerto Grosso & Apocalypse
- Arthur Butterworth: Three Impressions for Brass, Odin
- Simon Dobson: The Drop, Lydian Pictures & Penlee
- Edward Elgar: The Severn Suite
- Edward Gregson: Of Men and Mountains, Connotations & Variations on Laudate Dominum
- Hans Werner Henze: Ragtimes and Habaneras
- Joseph Holbrooke: Clive of India
- Gustav Holst: A Moorside Suite
- Joseph Horovitz: Ballet for Band, Sinfonietta & Euphonium Concerto
- Herbert Howells: Three Figures Suite, Pageantry
- John Ireland: A Comedy Overture & A Downland Suite
- George Lloyd: Diversions on a Bass Theme & English Heritage
- Frederik Magle: The Hope for brass band, choir, organ and percussion
- William Mathias: Vivat Regina
- John McCabe: Cloudcatcher Fells, Salamander & The Maunsell Forts
- John Pickard: Gaia Symphony & Eden
- Edmund Rubbra: Variations on 'The Shining River'
- Robert Simpson: Energy & Volcano
- Phyllis Tate: Illustrations
- Bramwell Tovey: Coventry Variations, Pictures in the Smoke & The Night To Sing
- Ralph Vaughan Williams: Overture – Henry the Fifth, Prelude on Three Welsh Hymn Tunes & Variations for Brass Band
- Philip Wilby: Paganini Variations, A Breathless Alleluia, ...Dove Descending..., Vienna Nights, Revelation, Masquerade, Northern Lights, New Jerusalem & Red Priest
- Thomas Wilson: Processional, Sinfonietta, Refrains and Cadenzas, Cartoon for cornet and brass band, Cartoon for solo cornet and brass band, Cartoon for brass ensemble and optional percussion, Cartoon for cornet and piano

== Outdoor banding ==
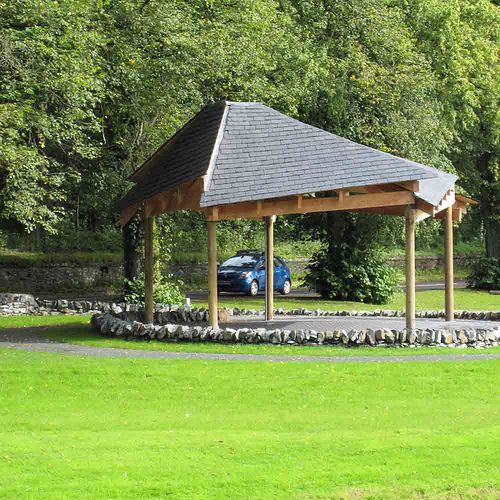
Jedforest Instrumental Bandstand, built in 2006, stands in the shadow of Jedburgh Abbey Scottish Borders

An advantage of the brass band is that it is mobile and capable of playing at any time and anywhere, even on the march. Marching and outdoor functions have been the preserve of the brass band for well over a century. Many UK brass bands are closely woven into the local community, performing outdoor civic duties throughout the year.

The bandstand became popular in the Victorian era, typically associated with the British brass band or military band. It is a simple construction which not only creates an ornamental focal point, but also serves acoustic requirements whilst providing shelter from the changeable British weather.

== Band associations ==
- Brass Bands England
- Swiss Brass Band Association
- Brass Bands' Association of New Zealand
- European Brass Band Association
- National Association of Brass Band Conductors
- National Band Council of Australia
- North American Brass Band Association
- Scottish Brass Band Association
- Southern Counties Amateur Bands Association

== Notable brass bands ==
=== Europe ===
- Brass Band Willebroek, brass band from Belgium.
- Brass Band Buizingen, brass band from Belgium.
- Eikanger-Bjørsvik Musikklag, a Norwegian brass band.
- Manger Musikklag, a Norwegian brass band (European champion in 2011).

==== Great Britain ====
===== Scotland =====
- The Cooperation Band (formerly Co-operative Funeralcare), 34 times Scottish champions and twice British champions

===== Northern England =====
- Reg Vardy Band, 33 times North of England champions and 2011 Grand Shield champions
- Fairey Band, brass bands and the 2010 English Champions
- Black Dyke Band, Reigning National Champions of Great Britain, 2017 British Open Champions and English National Champions in 2014; the most successful contesting band in the world
- Brighouse and Rastrick Brass Band
- Carlton Main Frickley Colliery Band, current Yorkshire Area Champions, Based in South Elmsall West Yorkshire
- Rothwell Temperance Band, 2009 Yorkshire region champions based in Rothwell, West Yorkshire
- Foden's Band, brass band based in Cheshire
- Rode Hall Silver Band, third section band based in Cheshire
- Grimethorpe Colliery Band, one of the most successful and successful brass bands in England, and one of the few to be widely known outside brass banding circles, due to their role in the film Brassed Off.
- The Harrogate Band, brass band based in North Yorkshire
- Hammonds Saltaire Band formerly also known as YBS Band, Yorkshire Building Society Band, or Hammonds Sauce Works Band. A brass band based in Huddersfield, West Yorkshire
- Yorkshire Imperial Band, National Winners 1978, British Open Winners on three occasions

===== The Midlands =====
- GUS Band, championship section band from Kettering.
- Yarwell Nassington Britannia Band, Recently celebrating 150 years in August of 2023

===== Southern England =====
- Callender's Cableworks Band (active 1898–1961), prolific BBC Radio broadcasters in 1920s and 1930s
- City of Oxford Silver Band founded in 1887
- Friary Brass Band, based in Guildford, London & Southern Counties champions in five consecutive years (2015–2019)
- Helston Town Band, a renowned Cornish band which plays the famous Floral Dance
- Lewes, Glynde & Beddingham Brass Band, brass band originally from the village of Glynde in East Sussex, now based in the neighbouring town of Lewes

===== Wales =====
- Tredegar Town Band, a Welsh brass band
- Cory Band, formed in the Rhondda Valley in 1884, they have been the number one ranked brass band in the world for over 10 years. In 2016, they won all four major contests in an unprecedented "Grand Slam", an accolade they achieved again in 2019.

=== North America ===
==== Ohio ====
- Dublin Silver Band

==== Midwest ====
- Eastern Iowa Brass Band, founded in 1985, a traditional, British-styled brass band.
- Bend in the River Brass Band, a British style brass band in Evansville, Indiana.

=== Oceania ===
- Wellington Brass Band, current national champions of New Zealand and Australia
- Dalewool Auckland Brass, New Zealand Band of the Year 2011.

== In popular culture ==
The 1996 British film Brassed Off is the story of a colliery brass band from a Yorkshire mining village, where the mine is threatened with closure. It culminates in the band winning the national finals in the Royal Albert Hall.

== See also ==
- Brass band
