= Time for Brass =

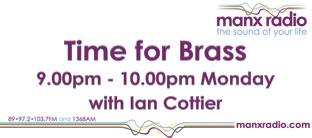
- Manx Radio logo for Time for Brass
- Genre: Brass Band Music
- Running time: Mondays, 9:00pm-10:00pm
- Country of origin: Isle of Man
- Language: English
- Home station: Manx Radio
- Starring: Ian Cottier
- Created by: Ian Cottier
- Original release: 7 September 1980
- Audio format: FM and MW radio and online
- Website: http://www.manxradio.com/blog.aspx?blogid=14728

Time for Brass, is a long running radio programme broadcast on Manx Radio and features music ostensibly from British Brass bands. The show is presented by Ian Cottier, a former headmaster at Douglas High School. First aired on 7 September 1980, the opening piece to feature on the programme was Prelude for an Occasion by Edward Gregson.

Time for Brass features music from various brass bands ranging from early recordings to contemporary Brass Band Music. Also included on the playlist are recordings by Manx bands such as the Onchan Silver Band and Rushen Silver Band.

The programme is transmitted on the station's 9:00pm – 10:00pm slot on Monday nights and is broadcast on FM and MW frequencies as well as world wide through the Manx Radio website.

Following transmission the edition is then available on the Manx Radio website to be listened to again for the following seven days.

Whilst Manx Radio is a commercial radio station, Time for Brass is not interrupted by the playing of commercials.
