= Paul Lovatt-Cooper =

- Born: 21 March 1976 (age 50); Alderney, Channel Islands
- Genre: Brass band
- Occupations: Percussionist, composer
- Instrument: Percussion
- Years active: 1994–present
- Label: Doyen
- Website: plcmusic.co.uk

Paul Lovatt-Cooper (born 21 March 1976) is an English percussionist and composer. He currently holds the position of director of music at Factory Transmedia, and is the managing director of his music company PLC Music. Lovatt-Cooper is also 'composer in association' with the Black Dyke Band.

He is married to Zoe Lovatt-Cooper (nee Hancock), former flugelhorn player for Black Dyke Band. They have two children together.

== Early life ==
Paul Lovatt-Cooper was born and raised in Alderney. His parents were officers in the Salvation Army. He was introduced into music by his family members, who were all musicians and keen to keep the family tradition going. Lovatt-Cooper started his musical career by playing the drums at school at the age of twelve. He joined the school band shortly after, which led to an invitation to play for former British Open Champions Kennedy's Swinton Band. The invitation came from his music teacher and conductor of the band Kevin Bolton.

== Career ==
=== Percussionist ===
As a percussionist, Paul Lovatt-Cooper has been moderately successful. At the age of 12, he began performing with the Kennedy's Swinton Band. He was invited to audition for the Williams Fairey Band in 1992 and passed. Lovatt-Cooper became a regular soloist and also became principal percussionist with the Williams Fairey Band. In 2003, Lovatt-Cooper left Faireys to join the Black Dyke Band as percussionist.

=== Composer ===
Paul Lovatt-Cooper started composing whilst at the University of Salford, studying under the brass and wind band composer Peter Graham.

After joining Black Dyke, the conductor Dr Nicholas Childs realised Lovatt-Cooper's potential as a composer. He soon had the band performing Lovatt-Cooper's works, starting with the world premiere of his Trombone Concerto "Earth's Fury" at Birmingham's Symphony Hall, which was recorded and broadcast on BBC Radio 2. In 2005, Lovatt-Cooper won the Brighouse and Rastrick Brass Band's 125th Anniversary Composers Competition with his piece "West Rydings".

Lovatt-Cooper's "Where Eagles Sing" was included as the finale to Karl Jenkins' CD This Land of Ours. "Where Eagles Sing" was also performed on BBC Radio 2's Friday Night is Music Night by the Band of the Coldstream Guards.

Lovatt-Cooper's music was featured in the gala concert of the National Championships of Switzerland 2007 by International Soloist David Childs where Lovatt-Cooper was the invited guest. Lovatt-Cooper's piece "The Dark Side of the Moon" was selected as a test piece for the regional championships 2008 and received performances all over the world. It was also selected as the test piece for the Dutch National Championships 2008.

Lovatt-Cooper has written several works for youth bands; his first, "Solar Eclipse", was commissioned by Colin Duxbury and the Stockport Schools Band, who performed it at the National Youth Championships of Great Britain in 2000, in which they won. "The Big Top" was composed for the Wardle High School Junior Band as part of their award-winning performance at the National Festival of Music for Youth Final at Birmingham's Symphony Hall in 2006.

"Dream Catchers" was commissioned by the National Children's Band of Great Britain in 2007 and has since been performed at York Minster in the summer of 2008 by the Yorkshire Youth Band. Lovatt-Cooper was commissioned by the British Federation of Brass Bands to compose the test piece for the National Youth Championships of Great Britain 2009.

A longtime fan of Bolton Wanderers F.C., he was commissioned by the club in 2021 to compose a piece of entrance music. The piece, entitled "Enter Our Heroes" was used at several matches in the 2021-22 season.

== Health issues ==
In 2013, Lovatt-Cooper suffered a stroke and was taken to Stepping Hill Hospital in Stockport.

== Discography ==
- Walking with Heroes – Black Dyke Band
- Only For You – Black Dyke Band
- Where Eagles Sing – Band of the Army Air Corps
- Regional's 2008 – Various
- Fields of Remembrance – Grenadier Guards Band
- Sirocco – Koninklijke Fanfare Band
- Vitae Aeternum – New York Youth Band
- Essential Dyke Volume 7 – Black Dyke Band
- Essential Dyke Volume 8 – Black Dyke Band
- Essential Dyke Volume 9 – Black Dyke Band
- Essential Dyke Volume 10 – Black Dyke Band
- It's a Musical Life – Leyland Band
- Equilibrium – Camberwell Citadel Band
- Shine – Les Neish
- Monument – Brett Baker with the Black Dyke Band
- Celtic Charm – David Childs with the Cory Band
- Within Blue Empires – Black Dyke Band
- Enter the Galaxies – The Cory Band
- Karl Jenkins ‘This Land of Ours’ – The Cory Band
- Horizons – Ratby Co-operative Band
- A Christmas Carol – Black Dyke Band
- Untold Stories – Owen Farr with the Cory Band
- National Brass Band Championships 2011 – Various
- Out of this World – The Cory Band
- Quicksilver – Perry Hoogendijk
- A Festival of Christmas Carols – Salvation Army
- Welsh Gold Collection: The Great Welsh Singers – Various
- Carols and Brass – Black Dyke Band with the Halifax Choral Society
- Fire in the Blood – International Staff Band of the Salvation Army
- Black Dyke Gold Vol 1 – Black Dyke Band
- Elgar Variations – Brass Band Willebroek
- A Second from Midnight – Jim Hayes with the Co-operative Funeralcare Band
- The Holly and the Ivy – Montclair Citadel Band
- Pressing Onward – New York Staff Band
- On The Castle Green – 3rd Carrickfergus Band
- Ten Years of Best Brass – Brassband Oberösterreich
- Soaring the Skies - Blue Coat School Brass Band
- Wall of Sound - National Children’s Brass Band of Great Britain
