= Eastern Iowa Brass Band =

Iowa Brass was formerly known as the Eastern Iowa Brass Band (EIBB), changing its name to Iowa Brass on June 17, 2021.

Iowa Brass is an amateur band which primarily performs brass band literature in the style and tradition of the British brass bands dating back to the early nineteenth century and continuing today. Iowa Brass also covers contemporary ensemble pieces, ranging from Broadway works, swing, New Orleans jazz, and artists such as Pat Metheny.

Founded in 1985, Iowa Brass is the only band of its kind in the state of Iowa. Iowa Brass plays in concert to audiences throughout the midwest.

== History of the band ==
Iowa Brass, originally called The Eastern Iowa Brass Band, grew from a brass ensemble that was part of the City Band in Mt. Vernon, Iowa, in 1985 after Don Stine, director of the city band, attended a seminar on the growing brass band movement in the United States. Regular rehearsals began soon thereafter, and the band competed in its first North American Brass Band Association (NABBA) Championship in April 1986. 2026 marked the 40th anniversary of the band. In celebration of this milestone, the band toured the upper Midwest over the summer, playing for and with other brass bands in Minnesota, Wisconsin, Illinois, and Iowa. In 2018, the band entered into a new community relationship, relocating to dedicated facilities in Solon, Iowa, after a 32 year run in Mt. Vernon.

== Directors ==
- 1985-1986: Kurt Claussen
- 1986-1989: Steve Wright
- 1989-1991: Dr. Alan Stang
- 1991-2001: John W. de Salme
- 2001-2002: Thomas L. Nelson
- 2003-2003: Don Stine
- 2003-2007: Earle Dickinson
- 2007-2010: Casey Thomas
- 2010-2011: Joshua Thompson
- 2011-2013: Kate Wohlman
- 2013: Paul Waech
- 2013–present: Alex Beamer

== The music ==
British band instrumentation features horns which are conical in design. Iowa Brass conforms to the unique British band style, characteristically limiting its instrumentation to brass, including cornets, flugelhorn, tenor horns, euphoniums, baritones, trombones, and tubas, as well as percussion. The 35-member band performs from a repertoire which features original works for brass band, as well as arrangements of well known orchestral and wind band literature. In addition, featured soloists are frequently used in concert programs which also include marches, medleys, hymn tune arrangements, folk songs, American patriotic offerings, Broadway showtunes, and novelty features. The majority of the band's concert schedule takes place during the summer months for community celebrations, civic events, and countless special festivals. They have performed in a variety of settings, from ornate concert halls to outdoor parks. Local audiences can also hear the band at three annual subscription concerts presented in May, October, and December.

== Recordings ==
- Reverence (2016) – a collection of hymn tunes
- Sweet Cornets (2009) – music featuring the Cornet Section
- Marching On (2004) – with the Eastern Iowa Brass Band
- Show Business (2001) – music from stage and screen
- The Spirit of Christmas (2001) – selections for the holiday season
- Contest Music Live! (1999) – competition performances 1997-1999, recorded live
- Celebrate (1996) – popular selections from their summer concert series
- NABBA Championships (1996) – competition performances 1995-1996, recorded live
- Remembering World War II (video) – World War II 50th anniversary commemorative concert
