= NABBA =

NABBA may refer to:

- National Amateur Body-Builders' Association
- North American Brass Band Association
