= Euphonium Concerto =

Concerto for euphonium written by Joseph Horovitz

- by Joseph Horovitz
- Other name: Concerto for Bassoon
- Key: C minor
- Composed: 1972
- Published: 1972 (original) & 1991 (piano arrangement)
- Publisher: Novello
- Duration: c. 16 minutes
- Movements: Three
- Scoring: Solo euphonium (or bassoon) with brass band (or chamber orchestra, wind orchestra, or piano)

Premiere
- Date: 14 October 1972
- Location: Royal Albert Hall, London
- Conductor: Stanley H. Boddington
- Performers: Trevor Groom (euphonium soloist) with the GUS Footwear band

The Euphonium Concerto is a concerto written by Joseph Horovitz for euphonium and British-style brass band (or, alternatively, wind orchestra or chamber orchestra). It is considered as one of the first euphonium concertos. It was commissioned by the National Brass Band Festival with funds from the Arts Council of Great Britain. The concerto is based on the classical form and consists of 3 movements, following the traditional fast–slow–fast structure. The concerto can alternatively be played on the bassoon using the ossias in the score.

== Structure ==
The movements are as follows:

1. Moderato
2. Lento
3. Con moto

There are quite a number of tempo/mood changes in movements 1–2.

1. Moderato ( = 86) — Tempo primo — Allegro vivace — Meno mosso — Pochissimo meno — un poco animando — Pochissimo meno — Stringendo — Molto meno (tempo primo) — Molto accelerando (Note: Changed to just "Tempo ♩=130" in the piano arrangement because many players mistook "Molto accelerando" for gradually increasing in speed (hence playing the passage too fast, contrary to the author's intentions).).
2. Lento ( = 58) — Adagio — Poco più moto — Tranquillo — Lento — Adagio — poco più moto
3. Con moto ( = 100–108) — ( = 130)

According to the composer's note, the three-movement structure "reflects a classical outlook" of concerti. In the first movement, the soloist plays well-articulated melodies intertwined with sixteenth-note runs and bold leaps. The second movement is a melodious slow movement, where the soloist plays over a simple chordal accompaniment. It contains a brief pastoral cadenza, apparently a homage to the border country. The third movement opens with a driving orchestral introduction, leading to a rondo on a "cheeky" theme introduced by the soloist. The ritornello theme is varied until an accelerating whole-tone version of it brings the concerto to a tutti cadence.
