= Foden's =

Foden's may refer to:

- Foden Trucks, British truck and bus manufacturer
- Foden's Band, an English brass band
- Fodens Ladies F.C., former English women's football team
