= Triangle Youth Brass Band =

Triangle Youth Brass Band (TYBB) a British-style brass band located in Raleigh, North Carolina that was formed in 1997 as a youth component of the Triangle Brass Band (TBB). Under the direction of Jesse Rackley, Matt Edwards, and Robin Gorham. The Youth Band program serves nearly 100 high school-aged musicians in three separate bands, Triangle Youth J. Perry Watson Brass Band (Watson), the Triangle Youth Brass Band (TYBB) and the Triangle Youth Academy Brass Band (TYABB). All three bands have done performances outside the triangle area, including tours to North American Brass Band Association (NABBA) championships. The three bands also perform locally and regionally as ambassadors of the British brass band tradition.

== History ==
The Triangle Youth Brass Band (TYBB) was founded in 1997 as a youth component for the Triangle Brass Band. In its first year, the band only gave one performance. It was conducted by Matt Edwards, Stephen Lytle, John Enloe, and Randy Guptill. Guptill took over conducting the band until Tony Granados took over in 2001. Tony Granados continued to conduct the band until May 2013 when Jesse Rackley, the band's current director, took his place. In 2007, the organization split off into two bands, the Triangle Youth Brass Band (TYBB), and the Triangle Youth Brass Ensemble (TYBE), the former being the more prestigious of the two and following a stricter instrumentation. The Triangle Youth Brass Ensemble was renamed the Triangle Youth Academy Brass Band (TYABB) in November 2013 and was under the direction of Matt Edwards. In 2015, the Triangle Youth Brass Band Organization added a third band under the direction of Robin Gorham. The two existing bands were renamed: TYBB was renamed to the Triangle Youth J. Perry Watson Brass Band and TYABB was renamed to TYBB. The 3rd band assumed the name of the Triangle Youth Academy Brass Band (TYABB). The Youth Band's mission is to provide an opportunity for the finest area high school brass and percussion players to supplement their wind band experience by performing in a British-style brass band and to raise the level of brass playing in the area.

== National Competitive Awards ==
North American Brass Band Association Championships, Youth Division

- 2001 First Place, TYBB
- 2002 First Place, TYBB
- 2004 First Place, TYBB
- 2006 First Place, TYBB
- 2007 First Place, TYBB
- 2009 First Place, TYBB
- 2022 First Place, TYBB

North American Brass Band Association Championships, Youth Open Division

- 2007 First Place, TYBE
- 2008 First Place, TYBE
- 2009 First Place, TYBE
- 2022 First Place, TYBE

North American Brass band Association Championships, Solo and Ensemble

- 2002 First Place, Youth Percussion, Triangle Youth Percussion
- 2004 First Place, Youth Percussion, TYBB Percussion
- 2006 First Place, Youth Ensemble, Triangle Youth Brass Quintet
- 2006 First Place, Youth Percussion, Triangle Youth Percussion
- 2007 First Place, Youth Percussion, Triangle Youth Percussion
- 2021 First Place, Youth Percussion, Triangle Youth Percussion
- 2022 First Place, Youth Percussion, Triangle Youth Percussion
