= Harrogate Band =

English brass band

- Brass Band
- Founded: 1970 (56 years ago)
- Location: Harrogate, North Yorkshire, England
- Music director: Craig Ratcliffe
- Website: harrogateband.org

The Harrogate Band is a brass band based in Harrogate, North Yorkshire, England and was formed in 1970. They perform regularly in the local area and compete nationally in the 1st Section. The band are one of North Yorkshire's premier brass bands and are seen as a progressive and versatile band with strong community links who can provide music for any occasion. The Band have appeared on television many times on programmes such as Heartbeat, Escape to the Country, The One Show. Grayson Perry All Man (2016) Season 1 Episode 1. In 2016, the band was presented with the Sash award.

== Recent contest performances ==
The Harrogate Band are currently the reigning North of England 1st Section Champions, having won the 1st section contest at the Dolphin Centre, Darlington on 17 March 2018. Not only did the band win the 1st prize, but they also took home silverware for the Best Bass Section, Best Euphonium and Best Trombone (Bass Trombone). The band went on to represent the North of England in the National Championships which were held on 16 September 2018 at the Racecourse Centre, Cheltenham.

== Notable members (present) ==
- Craig Ratcliffe – Musical Director
- Robert Illsley – Principal Cornet
- Tony Malone – Solo Euphonium
- Nigel Jane – Soprano Cornet
- Lynne Illsley – Flugelhorn
- Ros Rowe – Solo Tenor Horn
- Dan Dickinson – Solo Trombone
- Keri Graham – Baritone
- Gavin Holman – E-flat Tuba
- Ian Bristow – E-flat Tuba
- Matthew Brunt - B-Flat Tuba
- Simon Lancaster-Brown - B-Flat Tuba
- Vince Ashby-Smith – Percussion

== Partial discography ==
Year	Album	Conductor
2011	Tea for Two	Craig Ratcliffe
2006	Swing!	David Lancaster
2001	Made In Harrogate	David Lancaster
1999	Christmas is Coming	David Lancaster

== Video clips ==
- The Band performing at Durham Miners Gala in 2010
- The Band performing at Durham Miners Gala in 2011
