= Henry James Metcalfe =

Henry James Metcalfe (b. London 1835 – d. Wolverhampton 1906) was a bandmaster, composer and publisher of music for Brass band (British style). He served in Ireland in a Depot Battalion of the 3rd Regiment of Foot, 'The Buffs', becoming bandmaster of its Bugle, Fife and Drum band. Leaving the army in 1857 due to ill-health, he moved to Walsall, Staffs., founded a brass band and began writing music for it. Shortly after, he relocated permanently to Wolverhampton, Staffs., and continued as a bandmaster, composer and publisher of music for such ensembles.

By 1878 he was publishing a house journal – eventually called 'Metcalfe's Musical Express' – which not only promoted his own compositions and arrangements, but also carried reports of contests between brass bands from around the country, technical articles, plus other anecdotal material not all of which was necessarily related to music.

He claimed to have been the first composer of dance music for brass bands: e.g. quadrilles, valses: (i.e. waltzes), schottische, polka, galop &c., from circa 1860. At that time, dance music was usually played on the violin – and hence not convenient for the cornet and other brass band instruments. An examination of approximately 45 surviving copies of his journal revealed over 250 titles published by him, though these were not all his own compositions. He was a delegate to the International Musical Congress in Antwerp in August 1885, reading a paper in the class 'Musical Education'. His journal was still being published in 1896.
