= Rockville Brass Band =

Rockville Brass Band, formed in 1976, is the oldest continually operating British-style brass band in the United States.

It is located in Rockville, Maryland, and like other brass bands consists of cornets, alto horns, baritones, trombones, euphoniums, basses, and percussion. The group plays a repertoire in the British and American traditions, and is conducted by Jermaine Fryer.

RBB has been the longest running competitive brass band in America, starting in 1983 with an appearance at the first NABBA competition to be held. With ten more subsequent NABBA appearances, and two at the Dublin Festival of Brass, the band proudly placed in the top three, nine times out of these thirteen competitions.

The band entered its 50th year in 2026.
