= Harry Mortimer =

British composer

Harry Mortimer CBE (10 April 1902 – 23 January 1992) was an English composer and conductor who specialised in brass band music, one of the foremost cornet players of his era.

Harry Mortimer was born in Hebden Bridge, Yorkshire, his father being conductor Fred Mortimer (1880–1953). Fred taught Harry and his brothers Rex and Alex to play the cornet, and also composition. Later Harry was taught by William Rimmer (1862–1936). In 1910, the family moved to Luton, where Harry became cornet soloist in the Luton Brass Band, and at the age of 14 years became conductor of the Luton Red Cross Junior Band. The Luton band was also conducted by Fred at this time, which raised their standard considerably. Under the conductor William Halliwell, the Band won the national championship in 1923 at Crystal Palace, the southernmost English Brass Band to do so. Their father then became conductor of the well-known Fodens Motor Works Band, meaning that the family moved to Sandbach, Cheshire. His three sons played in this band too: Alex euphonium, Rex (euphonium) and Harry (cornet).

All three sons became well-known conductors. In the 28 Championship section Finals held between 1930 and 1963, bands directed by one of the Mortimers became champion on 20 occasions. Father Fred won with the Foden's Motorworks Band seven times between 1930 and 1938, Harry nine times, (3 times with the Black Dyke Mills Band, 3 times with the Fairey Aviation Band, twice with the Fodens Motor Works Band and once with Munn and Felton's), Alex three times (twice with the CWS Manchester Band and once with the Black Dyke Mills Band) and Rex once (with the Fodens Motor Works Band). In addition, Harry led the Fairey Aviation Band to eight successes in the British Open Championship, in which brass bands from outside of Great Britain are occasionally invited to participate. As conductor of the Fairey Aviation Band, the Black Dyke Mills Band, Munn & Felton's (now Virtuosi GUS Band), Bickershaw Colliery Band and the Brighouse and Rastrick Brass Band, he celebrated numerous successes.

In 1945, Harry became Musical Director of the Morris Concert Band, with whom he also had numerous successes in competitions, took part in radio broadcasts and made many long-playing records. In the period of 1935 to 1970, he was conductor of the Fairey Aviation Band.

Between 1933 and 1940 Harry Mortimer was a soloist with the Hallé Orchestra in Manchester, with the Royal Liverpool Philharmonic Orchestra as well as with the BBC Northern Orchestra. Between 1936 and 1940 he was lecturer in trumpet at the Royal Northern College of Music in Manchester.

In 1942 he gave up his solo career with symphony orchestras and took charge of wind ensembles and brass bands with the BBC as Supervisor of Brass and Military Music. He was responsible for the creation of the weekly programme Listen to the Band. He continued in this post until 1964.

He achieved a great reputation as a conductor of large-scale concerts as well as festivals and competitions. Not only did he commit much of these to record, he also made many recordings with the Morris Motors Band, the Fairey Band, the Coventry Band and the former Foden's Band, often with the title Men O'Brass. Mortimer brought the Black Dyke Mills and Grimethorpe Colliery bands into the prestigious Promenade Concerts in the Royal Albert Hall in London.

== Works for Brass band ==
- The Medallion
- Normandy Beach
