= River Brass =

- Origin: Evansville, Indiana, United States
- Genres: Brass band
- Years active: 1991–present
- Website: www.riverbrass.com

River Brass (formerly the Bend in the River Brass Band) was established in 1991 as a community band. Over the years, the band has developed into a high-caliber competing band. The group took its original name from the ox bow bend of the Ohio River that separates the cities of Evansville, Indiana and Henderson, Kentucky. As the band gained more members from across the tri-state region, the geographical footprint was well beyond the original "bend in the river", so the name was changed in the fall of 2015 to "River Brass" to include members who live near both the Ohio River and Wabash River. The band currently rehearses at Epworth United Methodist Church in Newburgh, IN. Its current conductor is Dr. Pat Stuckemeyer.

River Brass follows the tradition of British brass bands in instrumentation and literature. River Brass is currently the only band of its type in the Southern Indiana/Western Kentucky region. Its members are non-professional post-high school players from southwestern Indiana, western Kentucky, and southeastern Illinois. Members range in age from the late teens to the eighties. This diverse group is brought together by their common interest in making and sharing high quality brass music.

River Brass's concert season typically consists of four concerts: a spring (pre-contest) concert, a summer concert, a fall classics concert, and a holiday concert. Concert sites vary depending on availability of venues.

== Competition history and results ==
River Brass has been participating in the North American Brass Band Association competition since 2007.

Results under the current name "River Brass":
2022: 3rd place in 10-Piece Ensemble - "River Brass Ten" (in lieu of full band)
2022: 1st place in Adult Flugelhorn/Tenor Horn Slow Melody Solo - Alex Schnautz (tenor horn)
2019: Tied 8th place in Second Section
2019: 1st place in Adult Brass Ensemble - "River Brass Six", featuring David Jarrett (cornet), Joe Stone (cornet), Alex Schnautz (horn), Joshua Britton (trombone), Joel Collier (euphonium), and Pat Stuckemeyer (tuba)
2019: 1st place Adult Trombone Technical Solo - Joshua Britton
2018: 6th place in Second Section
2017: 4th place in Second Section
2016: 3rd place in Second Section

Results under the former name "Bend in the River Brass Band":
2015: 5th place in Second Section
2015: 3rd place Adult High Brass Slow Melody Solo - Alex Schnautz (tenor horn)
2014: 3rd place in Second Section
2014: 3rd place Youth Percussion Solo - Madison Dora
2013: 2nd place in Third Section
2013: 2nd place Youth Percussion Solo - Madison Dora
2012: 1st place in Third Section
2012: 1st place Youth Percussion - Madison Dora
2011: 2nd place in Third Section
2009: 3rd place in Challenge Section
2008: 2nd place in Explorer Section
2007: 2nd place in Explorer Section

== Youth Band ==
The River Brass Youth Band was formed in January 2019 with its premiere concert on February 21, 2019, at Harrison High School. The youth band runs its main season during the first half of spring semester and is open to high school students. A shorter summer session runs during the month of June. This session is open to incoming freshman as well as graduated seniors. In the premiere season, the summer session of the RBYB included a short pre-concert at the Drum Corps International event "Drums on the Ohio". In 2020, a second youth band was formed due to the success of the first season - one band for middle school, and one band for high school. The concerts were eventually cancelled one week before performance due to the pandemic shutdown. The summer program was also dropped for 2020. The high school band resumed in January 2021 for their third season, but did not hold a summer session.

In 2022, the high school youth band held its fourth spring season and is exploring adding back in the summer session.
