= City of Oxford Silver Band =

British brass band

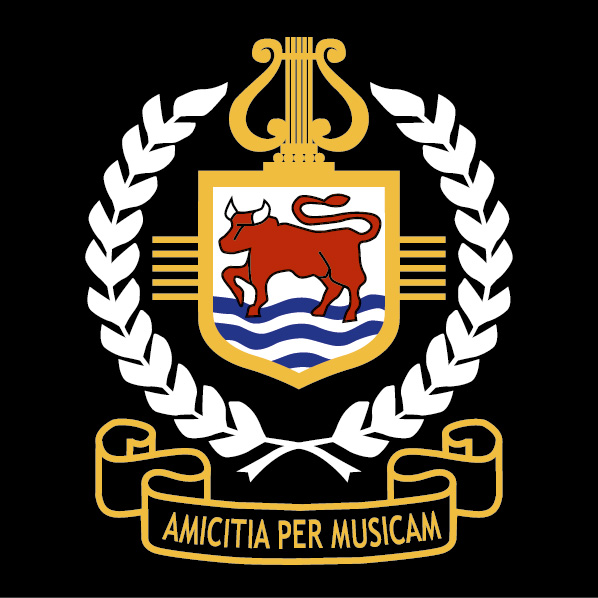
- The City of Oxford Silver Band

Background information
- Origin: Oxford, United Kingdom
- Genres: Brass band
- Years active: 1840s–present
- Website: www.cosb.co.uk

The City of Oxford Silver Band is a long-established competing, performing and touring band playing in the British brass band tradition. The band is notable for its emphasis on training and being the progenitor of several other bands in the local area. Having been founded in the mid 19th century it is the oldest surviving brass band in the county of Oxfordshire. Its motto is 'Amicitia per musicam' ('Friendship through music' ).

== Origins and history ==
According to the band's official history it was formed as the Headington Brass Band, in 1887 by AJ Taylor, three of his sons and eight other friends. In fact the Headington Brass Band had been playing at marches, village feasts and fêtes at least as far back as far as 1849 and Alfred Taylor, a carpenter, and his three sons are recorded as being members in 1857. It is possible that 1887 saw some form of reorganisation.

In the 19th century the band's activities included playing at village feasts, horticultural and livestock shows, Friendly Society gatherings, processions and marches. In the summer of 1887 the band played at celebrations to mark Queen Victoria's Golden Jubilee. In 1894, at the Oxford Waterman's regatta, the band played from the Varsity barge.

== Headington Silver Band ==
The Headington Brass Band changed its name to the Headington Temperance Band (c.1893) and then the Headington Subscription Band (1912) before becoming the Headington Silver Band in 1914 when a public appeal led to the purchase of silver-plated instruments. Following early competition success in 1922 the name was changed to the Headington Silver Prize Band.

The band had success in brass band competitions throughout the 1920s and 30s and continued to develop its training programme until the Second World War when it was temporarily disbanded.

Following the war the band reformed and prospered under its leaders Jim Alder and later Cyril 'Nobby' Challis. In 1951, noting that the band no longer had any significant connections to Headington, and reviving an idea first mooted in 1925, the band changed its name once again to the City of Oxford Silver Band. The members probably sensing that a more direct association with the historic city would help to raise the band's profile.

Challis's energy and drive, his interest in encouraging new young players and his emphasis on training led to the formation of the City of Oxford Youth Band and then, in 1970, the City of Oxford Junior Band. On 27 April 1975 the former achieved a world record by playing continuously for 28 hours and 45 minutes, witnessed by Roy Castle (presenter of BBC Record Breakers and an honorary vice-president of the band at the time). In August 1976 the youth band also toured the United States and Canada and recorded an LP under the direction of Terry Brotherhood. One of the pieces performed being a specially composed Bicentenary March.

== Competing ==
Competing has been a less important factor in the band's history than training and performing locally and overseas and its results reflect this, However the band achieved good results in the championship section of the National Brass Band Association in 1987, and in the first section in 1994. In 1997 the band secured eight trophies in five months and became London and Southern Counties Champions. In recent years its fortunes declined and by 2012 the band was playing in the fourth section. In March 2014, however, it secured promotion to the third section and qualified for the National Finals.

== Band Hall ==
The Headington Brass Band never had a permanent home of its own, plans for an ambitious band hall were drawn up in 1919 but it was never built. But in 1966 with the help of the Lord Mayor, the band was able to move to a purpose-built band hall in Temple Cowley.

== The current band ==
The City of Oxford Silver Band currently comprises four units, a senior band for performing and competing, a training band, a beginners band and a reception class.

== Notable tours ==
The band has been on a number of tours in recent years:

- 1957 Holland (Arnhem)
- 1971 Bonn
- 1973 France and West Germany
- 1976 USA and Canada
- 1987 Bonn
- 1988 Wilitz, Luxembourg
- 1996 Boulogne-sur-Mer
