= The Cooperation Band =

Musical group

the cooperation band

Background information
- Also known as: CWS (Glasgow) Band; Co-operative Funeralcare Band
- Origin: Glasgow, Scotland
- Genres: British brass band
- Years active: 1918––present
- Labels: Doyen
- Website: www.thecooperationband.co.uk

The Cooperation Band (stylised as the cooperation band) is a British brass band based in Glasgow. It has won the Scottish brass band championship a record 36 times, and the National Brass Band Championships of Great Britain twice.

== History ==
The band was formed in 1918 as the Scottish Co-operative Wholesale Society (SCWS) band, originally drawing its players from the SCWS tobacco factories in Glasgow. It continued to receive sponsorship from the Co-operative Group, adopting a number of names relating to the group's business, most recently the Co-operative Funeralcare Band from 2009 until 2019.

As the CWS (Glasgow) Band, they won the National Brass Band Championships of Great Britain in 1990, and repeated this feat in 1996.

In 2018, it was announced that the Co-operative Group would withdraw its sponsorship, and the band's future seemed in doubt. However, a new sponsorship deal was arranged with Scotmid cooperative society, which brought with it a new name of "the cooperation band".

In 2024, the cooperation band appointed Katrina Marzella-Wheeler as their Principal Conductor, the first woman to hold this position in the band's history.
