= Black Dyke Band =

British brass band

- Brass band
- Short name: Black Dyke
- Former name: Black Dyke Mills Queensbury Band, Black Dyke Mills Band, John Foster Black Dyke Mills
- Founded: 1855 (171 years ago)
- Location: Queensbury, Bradford, West Yorkshire, England
- Music director: Prof. Nicholas Childs
- Website: blackdykeband.co.uk

Picture sleeve for the "Thingumybob" single, Apple 4

Black Dyke Band, formerly John Foster & Son Black Dyke Mills Band, is one of the oldest and most well-known brass bands in the world. It originated as multiple community bands founded by John Foster at his family's textile mill in Queensbury, Bradford, West Yorkshire, England, in the mid-19th century. The ensemble has become prominent in competitive band championships and through recordings for film and television.

The band is well-known for recording the soundtrack to the BBC gardening makeover series Ground Force in 1997, and appeared in the Christmas edition of Victoria Wood's sitcom Dinnerladies in 1999. In 1998, they played on the Academy Award-nominated song "That'll Do" from Babe: Pig in the City. They have featured on recordings and live appearances by acts including the Beatles, Paul McCartney and Tori Amos. In 2014, the band won the National Brass Band Championships of Great Britain for a record 23rd time, and the British Open Championship for another record 30th time. They have also won the European Championships a record thirteen times, most recently in 2015.

== History ==
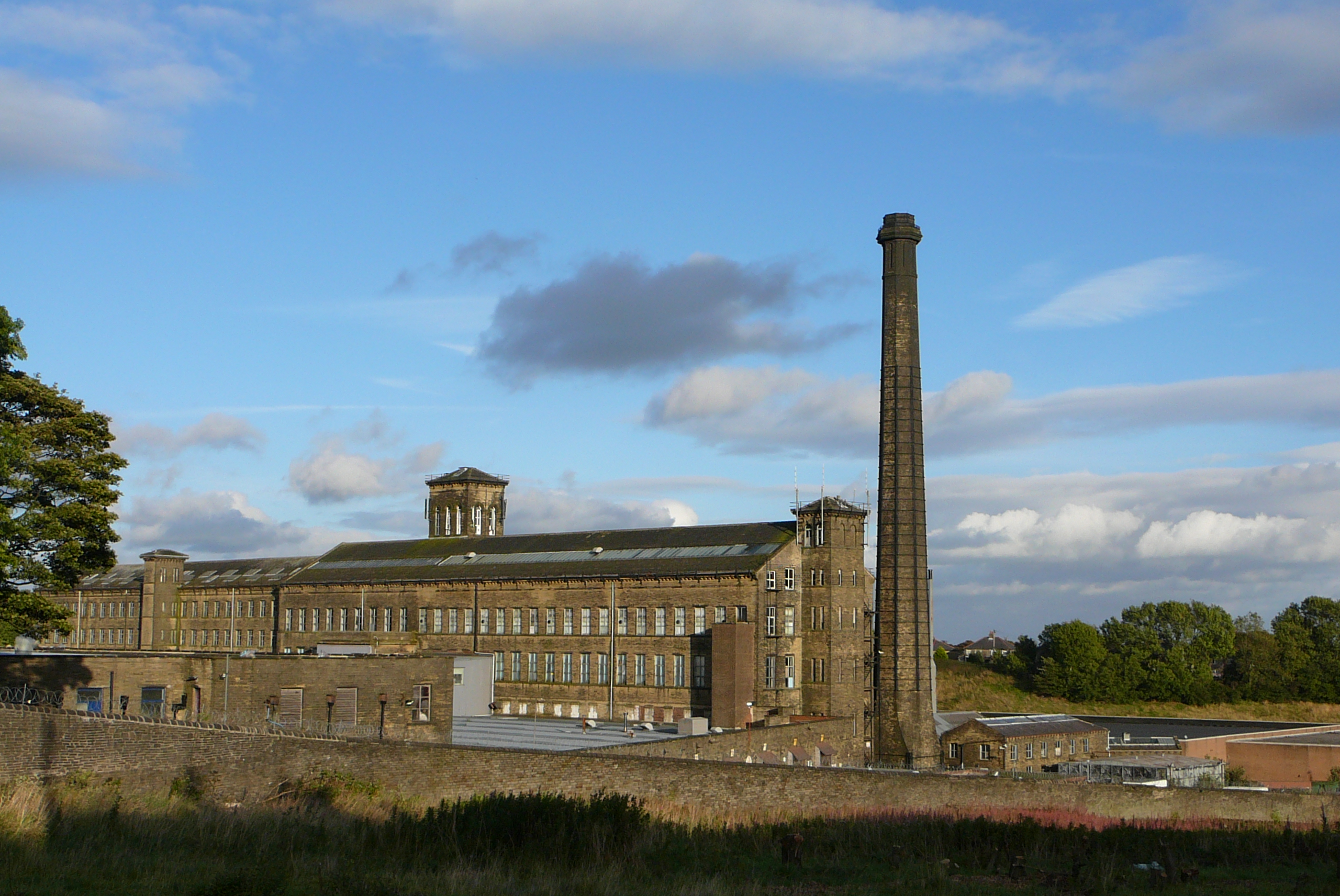
Black Dyke Mills, 2007

The band was formerly the band of the Black Dyke Mills in Queensbury, Bradford, West Yorkshire, England, a company owned by John Foster. Foster, a French horn player, joined with others in a small brass and reed band in Queensbury in 1816. That band faltered, and another one, called the Queenshead Band, which consisted of 18 musicians, was formed in around 1843. The second band also faltered but, in 1855, Foster and other musicians established the new mill band, and outfitted it with uniforms made from the mill's own cloth. Most of the musicians also worked at the mill, and a close bond was fostered with the local community. The band has remained active since that time, and still rehearses in its original rooms.

Black Dyke was the first band to achieve the "Grand Slam" in 1985 by winning the Yorkshire regional, European, British Open and National Championship contests. They were also voted BBC Band of the Year.

They appeared in an episode of Victoria Wood's dinnerladies sitcom in 1999.

== European Championships ==
| Year | City | Conductor |
|---|---|---|
| 1978 | London, England | Major Peter Parkes |
| 1979 | London, England | Major Peter Parkes |
| 1982 | London, England | Major Peter Parkes |
| 1983 | Kerkrade, Netherlands | Major Peter Parkes |
| 1984 | Edinburgh, Scotland | Major Peter Parkes |
| 1985 | Copenhagen, Denmark | Major Peter Parkes |
| 1987 | Nottingham, England | Major Peter Parkes |
| 1990 | Falkirk, Scotland | David King |
| 1991 | Rotterdam, Netherlands | David King |
| 1995 | Luxembourg, Luxembourg | James Watson |
| 2005 | Groningen, Netherlands | Dr Nicholas Childs |
| 2012 | Rotterdam, Netherlands | Dr Nicholas Childs |
| 2015 | Freiburg, Germany | Prof Nicholas Childs |

== Recordings ==
Black Dyke Band has made over 350 recordings, including one of the first brass band recordings in 1904 and classical music. It has recorded with classical bass trombonist Douglas Yeo, and pop acts Tori Amos, Peter Gabriel and The Beautiful South. The band also worked with Gabriel on the highly acclaimed Millennium Show, featured in the Millennium Dome, as well as recording the music for the BBC programme Ground Force.

In September 1968, the band released a single on The Beatles’ Apple Records label. The A-side was an instrumental composed by Lennon–McCartney called "Thingumybob" (the theme to a London Weekend Television sitcom of the same name starring Stanley Holloway). The flipside was a brass band instrumental version of another Lennon–McCartney song, "Yellow Submarine". The single was released under the name John Foster & Son Ltd Black Dyke Mills Band, produced by McCartney, and was one of the first four singles issued on the Apple label. In 1979, the Black Dyke Mills Band worked again with McCartney on a track for the Wings album Back to the Egg.

In August 2009, the band undertook a tour of Australia with multi-instrumentalist James Morrison which culminated in a concert at the Sydney Opera House.

== Members ==
As of 2026, the principals of the band's line up included:

- Soprano cornet: Connor Lennon
- Principal cornet: Tom Hutchinson
- Flugelhorn: Vacant
- Solo horn: Siobhan Edwards
- Solo baritone: Mike Kavanagh
- Solo trombone: Adam Warburton
- Bass trombone: Adam Reed
- Solo euphonium: Adam Bokaris
- Solo E♭ bass: Tommy Tynan
- Solo B♭ bass: Matthew Routley
- Principal Percussion: Gareth Hand

The band's current principal conductor and director of music is the Welsh euphonium virtuoso Prof. Nicholas Childs. His predecessor was trumpet player James Watson.

Paul Lovatt-Cooper was the band's 'composer in association' and former principal percussionist. He retired from playing in early 2011 in order to concentrate on his teaching, conducting and composition.

Black Dyke Band is the brass band in residence at the Royal Northern College of Music in Manchester, and Childs also conducts the RNCM Brass Band.

=== Former members ===
- John Maines, principal trombone
- Maurice Murphy, principal cornet
- James Shepherd, principal cornet
- Richard Marshall, principal cornet
