= Edward Gregson =

English composer

- Born: 23 July 1945 (age 81); Sunderland, England
- Education: Royal Academy of Music
- Occupation: Composer
- Employer(s): Royal Northern College of Music (Principal, 1996–2008)
- Television: Title music to BBC's Young Musician of the Year
- Website: edwardgregson.com

Edward Gregson (born 23 July 1945) is an English composer of instrumental and choral music, particularly for brass and wind bands and ensembles, as well as music for the theatre, film, and television. He was also principal of the Royal Northern College of Music.

== Early life and education ==
He was born in Sunderland, England, in 1945. He studied composition (with Alan Bush) and piano at the Royal Academy of Music from 1963 to 1967, winning five prizes for composition. Although his works have no opus numbers, he referred to his Oboe Sonata as his Opus 1.

== Career ==
In 1988, he was nominated for an Ivor Novello award for his title music to BBC Television's Young Musician of the Year programmes, for which he also regularly officiated as a jury member and broadcaster.

He was Principal of the Royal Northern College of Music in Manchester from 1996 to 2008. There he faced criticism for the appointment of Malcolm Layfield, previously a violin teacher at the College, to the post of Head of Strings, despite Gregson's knowledge of allegations that Layfield had a history of sexual misconduct against students.

In 2008, he retired from academic life to concentrate on his composition.

He has since completed orchestral commissions for the Royal Liverpool Philharmonic, the Bournemouth Symphony, the Hallé and the BBC Philharmonic orchestras. In 2014, the North American Brass Band Association honored both Edward Gregson and his brother Bramwell Gregson (best known for his conducting work with the London Citadel Band and Canada's Brassroots, modelled on the Philip Jones brass tentet). Each section's required test piece was composed by Edward Gregson.

He continues to sit on a number of Boards relating to music education and the music industry. He is a Companion of the Royal Northern College of Music, and a Fellow of the Royal Academy of Music and the Royal College of Music.

In October 2024 Gregson was nominated for an Ivor Novello Award at The Ivors Classical Awards. Viola Concerto "Three Goddesses" was nominated for Best Large Ensemble Composition.

== Performances ==
His music has been performed by many orchestras and ensembles worldwide, including in the UK: the London Symphony Orchestra and all the BBC orchestras; in the USA: Detroit, Louisville and Albany (New York); in the Far East: Tokyo Philharmonic and China National Broadcasting Orchestra; and in Europe: orchestras in France, Germany, the Netherlands, Luxembourg, and Scandinavia.

A major retrospective of his music was held in Manchester in 2002.

== Recordings ==
Chandos have released several complete discs of works by Gregson, including:

- Trumpet Concerto, Saxophone Concerto, Concerto for piano and wind
- Blazon, Clarinet Concerto, Violin Concerto, Stepping Out
- Music for Chamber Orchestra, Trombone Concerto, Two Pictures for String Orchestra, 'A Song for Chris' (Cello Concerto)

Naxos has recorded the complete piano music including the Piano Sonata in one movement, and the two string quartets.

Several CDs of his music for brass have been recorded by various groups on the Doyen label:

- Gregson Volume 1 (DOY CD 017) Desford Colliery Caterpillar Band, circa 1992
  - Dances and Arias
  - Concerto for French Horn and Brass Band (w. Frank Lloyd, horn)
  - Connotations
  - Of Men and Mountains
- Gregson 2
- Gregson 3
- Gregson 4 The Trumpets of the Angels
- Halle Brass plays Gregson
- Edward Gregson Wind Music
- Gregson 5 Symphony

== Works ==
- 1965 – Oboe Sonata
- 1966 – In The Beginning
- 1967 – Quintet for Brass
- 1968 – Music for Chamber Orchestra
- 1968 – Divertimento for trombone and piano
- 1968 – March Prelude
- 1971 – Horn Concerto
- 1971 – Horn Concerto (wind ensemble version)
- 1971/1999 – Partita (for brass band)
- 1973 – The Plantagenets
- 1976 – Tuba Concerto (orchestral version)
- 1976 – Tuba Concerto (brass band version)
- 1976 – Tuba Concerto (wind orchestral version)
- 1976 – Variations on Laudate Dominum
- 1976 – Connotations
- 1978 – Flourish for Orchestra
- 1979 – Metamorphoses
- 1979 – Trombone Concerto
- 1982 – Six Little Piano Pieces
- 1983 – Contrasts – a concerto for orchestra
- 1983 – Equale Dances
- 1983 – Piano Sonata in one movement
- 1983 – Trumpet Concerto
- 1984 – Dances and Arias
- 1984 – Sonata for Four Trombones
- 1985 – Festivo
- 1986 – Occasion
- 1987 – Missa Brevis Pacem
- 1988 – Make A Joyful Noise
- 1992 – Of Men and Mountains
- 1994 – Clarinet Concerto
- 1997 – A Welcome Ode
- 1999 – The Dance, forever the Dance
- 1971/1999 – Partita (revision for symphonic wind band)
- 2006 – Saxophone Concerto
- 2007 – Cello Concerto
- 2009 – Dream Song
- 2009 – Goddess
- 2009 – Tributes
- 2011 – An Album for my Friends for piano
- 2012 – Symphony in Two Movements
- 2014 – String Quartet No 1
- 2017 – String Quartet No 2
- 2020 – Three Etudes for piano
