= Tredegar Town Band =

- Brass Band
- Short name: Tredegar
- Former name: Tredegar Silver, Tredegar Workman's Town, Tredegar Workmen's, Tredegar Workmen's Prize
- Founded: 1849 (176 years ago)
- Location: Blaenau Gwent, South Wales
- Music director: Ian Porthouse
- Website: tredegartownband.co.uk

Tredegar Town Band are a brass band from the town of Tredegar, located in South Wales, founded in 1849. They are managed by Ian Porthouse.

== History ==
The origins of the band date back to 1849, when they participated in a procession to celebrate the opening of a new mill. The band was formally constituted in 1876, following donations from the public.

After the Second World War, they enjoyed increasing success, winning the Second Section Champion Band of Great Britain in 1973, the Champion Band of Wales in 1974, and the Grand Shield in 1976.

They placed on the podium in the European Brass Band Championship in 1991 and 2011, runners-up at the National Championship of Great Britain in 1993 and 2003, and runners-up at the British Open in 1996, before winning the British Open for the first time in 2010.

In 2013, they won the British Open for the second time, beating the second-place band, Cory.

== Contemporary activities ==
As of 2019, Tredegar Town Band are currently ranked #4 out of all brass bands in the world, according to 4barsrest's 2022 list.

The band starred in the 2014 film Pride.

In 2022, Tredegar Town Band debuted at the BBC Proms, with a joint performance with BBC National Orchestra of Wales of Gavin Higgins's new ‘concerto grosso, followed the next day with their own Late Night Prom.
