= Foden's Band =

English brass band

- Brass Band
- Short name: Foden's
- Former name: Britannia Building Society Band, Britannia Building Society Fodens, Elworth Silver Band, Foden O.T.S., Fodens (Courtois), Fodens (Richardson), Fodens Motor Waggon Works, Foden's Motor Wagon Works, Fodens Motor Works, Foden's Motor Works, Fodens OTS Band, Foden's Steam Wagon Works, Foden's Wagon Works, Foden's Works, Fodens Works Elworth
- Founded: 1900 (126 years ago)
- Location: Sandbach, Cheshire, England
- Principal conductor: Russell Gray
- Music director: Michael Fowles
- Website: fodensband.co.uk

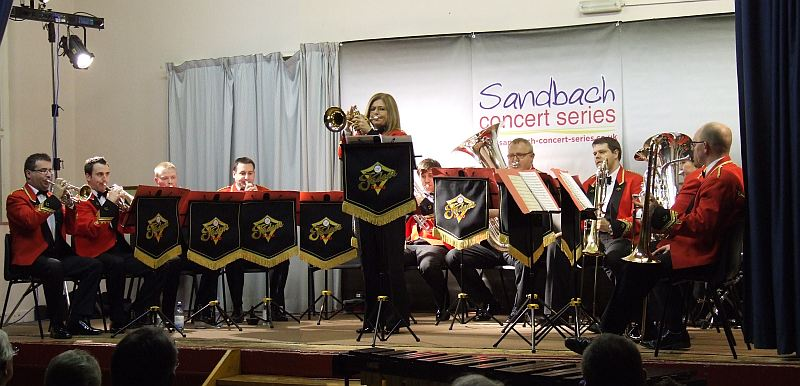
Fodens 12-piece Brass Band (about half the full band), featuring flugel horn soloist Helen Williams, 30 November 2011 at the Sandbach Concert Series

Foden's Band (originally Foden's Motor Works Band, and variants with sponsors' names) is a brass band from Sandbach in Cheshire. The band derives its name from the Foden manufacturer of trucks in Sandbach. Foden's Band are one of the top brass bands in the world; regularly appearing at the top of the "World of Brass – World Rankings" In 2012, Foden's became double winners of both the National Championships and the British Open.

== History ==
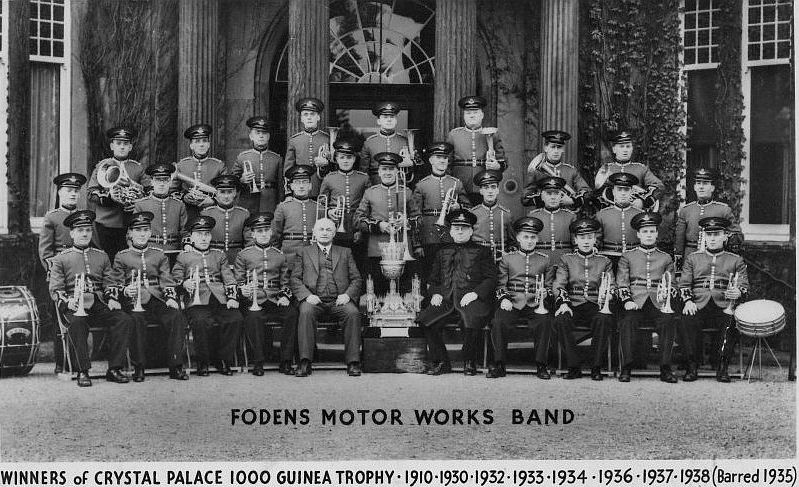
Fodens Motor Works Band c. 1938

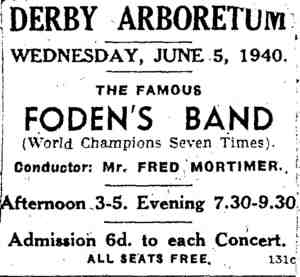
Seven-times World Champions Fodens Band 1940 advert conductor: Fred Mortimer

Fabulous Fodens record sleeve

=== Origins ===
The origins of the band go back to 1900, when the village of Elworth, near Sandbach in Cheshire, formed its own band, having been let down in its attempt to secure the services of the nearby town band to feature in the celebrations marking the relief of Mafeking in the Boer War. After a couple of years the village band was wound up, but from that base local industrialist Edwin Foden formed the Fodens Motor Works Band. For a few years the new band had modest ambitions, but in 1908 a fundamental reorganisation took place and, by the following year, it had achieved Championship Section status, a prestigious position that has been maintained ever since.

=== Fred and Harry Mortimer years ===
Conductor Fred Mortimer (1880–1953) led Fodens for 27 years from around 1927 until his death in 1953. During that time they won the national championships eight times, and according to Mortimer, had been broadcast around 250 times.

On 9 November 1933, the band appeared in the Lord Mayor's Show in London, billed as the Band of Foden Motor Works.

In 1955, the musical director, Harry Mortimer (1902–1992), formed the Men O'Brass, whereby selected members of the band combined with other players from the Fairey Band and Morris Motors Band. In January 1983, the band was sponsored by Overseas Technical Services Ltd. from Harrow, being renamed the Foden OTS Band.

In July 1986, it was sponsored by the Britannia Building Society to become the Britannia Building Society Foden Band, which became the Britannia Building Society Band. In September 1997, the band was sponsored by the Antoine Courtois company of France, to become the Fodens Courtois Band. In November 2004, the band was sponsored by Richardson Developments of Oldbury. Since 2008 the band has been without sponsorship and is currently known as the Foden's Band.

=== Honours ===
The band has been ordered to play by Royal Command on three occasions: in 1913 for George V and Queen Mary, in 1938 at Windsor Castle for George VI and Queen Elizabeth, and in 1983 where the band had the honour of playing for Elizabeth II at Buckingham Palace.

The band has won the National Brass Band Championships of Great Britain twelve times. In 2008 the band won the 156th British Open Championships. It was the 11th time that the Foden's Band had triumphed at the contest. 2009 saw further success for the band with a record-breaking 4th consecutive triumph at the North West Regionals, victory at the Cambridge International Masters and then winning the Brass in Concert Championships at the Sage Centre in Gateshead in November. In 2010, the band came 6th at the English Nationals, 4th at the British Open, 9th at the National Championships and 3rd at Brass in Concert.

=== Desert Island Discs ===
Foden's band have been featured on the BBC radio programme Desert Island Discs on several occasions:

- 1 August 1951, Jimmy Edwards (comedy actor, scriptwriter), The Fodens Motor Works Band: The Three Bears Suite
- 11 July 1960, Eddie Calvert (trumpeter), Fodens Motor Works Band: Zelda (Caprice)
- 16 April 1962, Billy Butlin (holiday camp owner), The Fodens Motor Works Band: The March of the Herald
- 8 February 1965, Owen Brannigan (opera singer), Alec Mortimer & Foden's Motor Works Band: Drinking
- 16 January 1971, Robert Bolt (playwright), Fairey & Fodens Massed Bands: The Stars and Stripes Forever

== Contesting honours ==
- British Open Brass Band Championships – 13 Wins: 2023, 2012, 2008, 2004, 1964, 1928, 1927, 1926, 1915, 1913, 1912, 1910, 1909
- National Championships of Great Britain – 16 wins: 2022, 2021, 2018, 2012, 1999, 1958, 1953, 1950, 1938, 1937, 1936, 1934, 1933, 1932, 1930, 1910 (barred 1935).

(Previously called the Crystal Palace 1000 Guinea Trophy)

- North West Regional Championships – 16 wins, including: 2009, 2008, 2007, 2006, 2003, 2002, 2000, 1999, 1998, 1989, 1988
- Brass in Concert Championships – 7 Wins: 2023, 2009, 2000, 1998, 1990, 1988, 1987.
- All England Masters – 7 Wins: 2009, 2007, 2002, 1995, 1994, 1991, 1990.
- English National Championships – Winners 2006
- European Championships – Winners 1992

== Musical directors ==
The band's current conducting team is:

- Michael Fowles
- Russel Gray

== Current Players ==
The band's current players as of 8th of August 2026 are:

- Soprano Cornet: Richard Poole
- Principal Cornet: Mark Wilkinson
- Solo Cornets: Jon Probert, Darren Lea and Darcie Dewhurst
- Repiano Cornet: Paul White
- 2nd Cornets: Adrian Lacey and Adrian Beresford
- 3rd Cornets: Robin Basu and Terri Handley
- Flugel Horn: Mike Eccles
- Solo Horn: Grace Jeffers
- 1st Horn: Eloisa Donovan
- 2nd Horn: Andy Howard-Smith
- Solo Euphonium: Gary Curtin
- 2nd Euphonium: Mark Bousie
- Solo Baritone: Ashley Dixon
- 2nd Baritone: Mike Warriner
- Principal Trombone: John Barber
- 2nd Trombone: Ollie Webb
- Bass Trombone: Shaun Farrington
- E flat Tubas: Stewart Baglin and Paul Hughes
- B flat Tubas: Andy Cattanach and George Mitchell
- Percussionists: Sam Iles, Ollie Jackson and Rimika Umetsu

== Bibliography ==
- F. D. Burgess, By royal command: the story of Fodens Motor Works Band, Publisher Webberley, 1977
- Allan Littlemore, Fodens Band: One Hundred Years of Musical Excellence, Edition 2, Publisher Caron Pubns, 2000. ISBN 0-947848-20-7. 186 pages.
