= Smoky Mountain Brass Band =

The Smoky Mountain Brass Band (SMBB) is a British-style brass band based in Asheville, North Carolina. The band, which consists of both professional and non-professional musicians, performs several concerts each year all throughout western North Carolina. The current Director of Music of the Smoky Mountain Brass Band is Casey Coppenbarger.

Being a British-style brass band, the band's instrumentation differs from that of most American bands. The band consists entirely of brass and percussion instruments. The brass instruments used are mostly conical bore instruments (e.g. cornets, alto horns, and euphoniums) except for the trombones. Most instruments are in the keys of E♭ and B♭.

== History ==
The Smoky Mountain Brass Band was founded in April, 1981, by Richard Trevarthen and a small group of musicians from western North Carolina after attending a brass band workshop at NC State University. Since then, the Smoky Mountain Brass Band has been active, performing concerts and participating in competitions and festivals. In its first two years, the band performed more than 20 concerts, including at the 1982 World's Fair and the Fifth Annual British Band Festival at NC State University. The band was the winner of the Championship Section of the First North American Brass Band Championship in 1983 and the runner-up the following year. The band was part of the celebration surrounding North Carolina's 400th anniversary, performing three concerts in Durham, North Carolina for the occasion.
