= Lewes, Glynde & Beddingham Brass Band =

Brass band from Sussex, England

The Lewes, Glynde and Beddingham Brass Band, or LGB Brass, is a brass band from Sussex. It was formed in the village of Glynde, but is now based in nearby Lewes, the county town of East Sussex.

The coat of arms of East Sussex, which is also the badge of LGB Brass

== History ==
The band was formed in 1922 by William Turner, the station master at Glynde railway station, and was originally known as the 'Glynde & Beddingham Brass Band', as all the founding members of the band lived either in Glynde itself or the neighbouring village of Beddingham. Its rehearsal room during this period was the Glynde Reading Room. In 2002, Lewes Town Council invited the band to move to the All Saints Centre in Lewes, and the band consequently changed its name to 'Lewes, Glynde and Beddingham Brass Band', or 'LGB Brass' for short. The change of name also reflected the fact that by this point the majority of the band's members came from Lewes or from towns and villages elsewhere in Sussex rather than from Glynde and Beddingham.

== Contesting ==
The Glynde and Beddingham Brass Band has been a contesting band since 1927, when it appeared at the Royal Tunbridge Wells Contest.

In its modern incarnation as LGB Brass, the band is a frequent participant in the National Brass Band Championships of Great Britain, reaching the national finals for the first time in 2006. At the beginning of the 2010s it was in the Fourth Section, but having been promoted in 2011, 2013 (when it was National Third Section Champion) and 2019, it currently plays in the First Section, the highest level of competition below the elite Championship Section, and the highest ranking the band has achieved to date.

== Other Activities ==
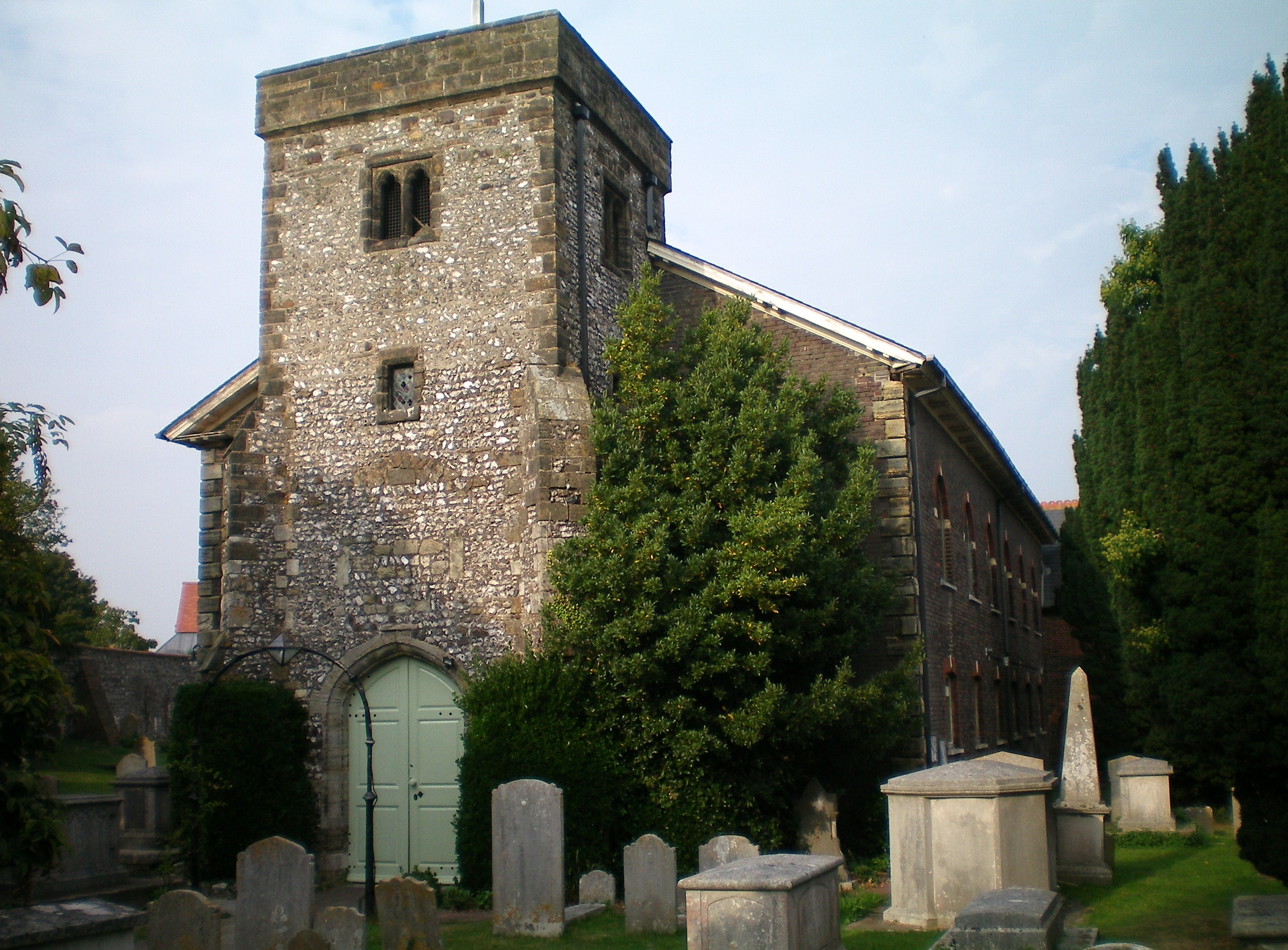
The All Saints Centre, LGB Brass's home since 2002

As Lewes's town band, LGB Brass often plays at municipal functions, notably the annual Remembrance Day parade, and participates in the Lewes Bonfire Night celebrations, for which it marches with the Commercial Square Bonfire Society. The band tours to Lewes's twin towns Blois and Waldshut-Tiengen on a semi-regular basis, most recently to Waldshut in 2009 and 2014.

In recent years, the band has also begun playing regularly at football matches for both Lewes F.C. Women , and Premier League side Brighton & Hove Albion.
