= Dalewool Auckland Brass =

The Dalewool Auckland Brass Band was a brass band founded in 1919 in Auckland, New Zealand. It began as the Auckland Watersiders Silver Band and has existed under numerous names and incarnations, including Continental Airlines Auckland Brass and Fosters Auckland Brass, until formally becoming Dalewool Auckland Brass in the late 1990s.

In the 1990s, the band won the Champion Brass Band of New Zealand more than any other group. The band was crowned Champion Band of New Zealand in 2003 and 2004, and Band of the Year in 2005, and ranked top 10 at the prestigious British Open Brass Band Championships competition.

== History ==
The band began in 1919 as Auckland Watersiders Silver Band. In the 1950s, it was renamed the Auckland Metropolitan Fire Brigade Band. In the 1960s, the band merged with the Onehunga Band to become the Waitemata Onehunga Silver Band. The band reached A grade championship status in 1949 and achieved its first New Zealand Champion Band title in 1957.

Sponsorship by a local engineering firm saw the band's name change to Turrells Onehunga Brass Band, under which name they won the 1977 New Zealand Championships under the musical directorship of Errol Mason.In 1979, the band obtained sponsorship from Continental Airlines, becoming Continental Airlines Auckland Brass.

In 1986, a new bandroom was completed on Captain Springs Road in Onehunga, built on the site of the original bandroom. On the eve of the opening of the bandroom, Mason died.

When Continental Airlines ceased flying to New Zealand in 1994, the band received sponsorship from Carlton & United Breweries, and became Fosters Auckland Brass. They went on to win the New Zealand title in 1995 and 1996, and the Australian title in 1996 and 1997. In the late 90s, Carlton & United Breweries ceased sponsorships in New Zealand, and the band renamed to Dalewool Auckland Brass, winning the 1998 New Zealand Championships, and the 2001 Australian Championships.

In 2001 the Band launched its Subscription Concert Series. In 2010 the band recorded the album Christmas Magic in collaboration with The Graduate Choir New Zealand.

In 2008, the band was unable to compete for the first time since 1995 due to financial difficulties.

In 2025, under the name of City of Sails Auckland Brass, the organisation was amalgamated into Auckland City Brass.
