= Soprano cornet =

Brass musical instrument

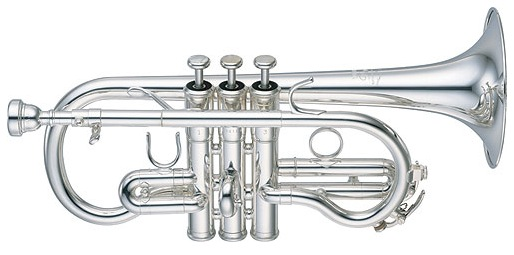
- An E♭ cornet

Brass instrument
- Classification: Wind; Brass; Aerophone
- Hornbostel–Sachs classification: 423.231 (Valved aerophone sounded by lip vibration featuring a conical bore)
- Developed: 19th century

Playing range
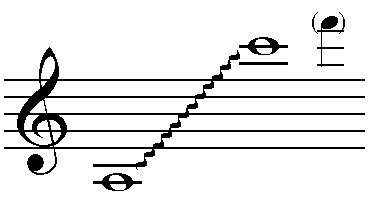
- (concert pitch)

Related instruments
- Cornet; Trumpet; Flugelhorn; Bass trumpet; Flumpet

The soprano cornet is a cornet, similar in design to the standard B♭ cornet, but smaller and pitched in E♭, a fourth higher. It is a transposing instrument.

== History ==
The soprano cornet was invented around 1844, and it gradually replaced the difficult soprano saxhorn in ensembles. In the twenty years after its invention the soprano cornet was more commonly pitched in D♭.

== Playing technique and sound ==
Soprano cornets often have issues with intonation. It is harder to play than a B♭ cornet because of the smaller mouthpiece, and it produces a lighter and airier sound. It has also been described as having a "wispy, flute-like" sound.

== Ensembles ==
A single soprano cornet is usually seen in brass bands and silver bands and can be found playing lead or descant parts in other musical ensembles. They can be heard clearly within a group of B♭ cornets.

== Notable players ==
Notable players of the soprano cornet include Charlie Cook, John Distin, Paul Duffy, and Peter Roberts.
