= Carlton Main Frickley Colliery Band =

British brass band

- Brass Band
- Short name: Carlton Main
- Former name: Carlton Main (Frickley) Colliery, Carlton Main and Frickley Colliery, Carlton Main Colliery, South Elmsall, South Elmsall & Frickley Colliery, South Elmsall and Frickley Colliery, South Elmsall Colliery, South Elmsall Village Brass Band
- Founded: 1884 (142 years ago)
- Location: South Elmsall, Pontefract, West Yorkshire, England
- Principal conductor: Allan Withington
- Music director: David Purkiss
- Website: carltonmain.co.uk

The Carlton Main Frickley Colliery Band is a brass band based in West Yorkshire, England, and close to South Yorkshire.

== History ==
The South Elmsall Village Brass Band can be traced back to 1884. In 1905, the band was adopted by the local Frickley Colliery, which in turn was to become owned by the Carlton Main Coal Company, and by 1923 the band became known by its present name.

By the mid 1990s times looked very bleak for the band, as it did for a great many other bands and working personnel in the mining industry, with the eventual closure of the pits in the UK and Frickley Colliery in particular in 1993 when band membership dropped to six members, but the band was rebuilt. By 1999, the band became Yorkshire Champions and represented Yorkshire at the Brass Band National Finals at the Royal Albert Hall in London.

== Championships ==
The band has held the titles of European Champions (in the 1960s), National Champions, British Open Champions, Granada TV Band of the Year, BBC Best of Brass Champions, Spring Festival Grand Shield Champions and Yorkshire Area Champions. The Band’s Quartet group have been British Open Quartet Champions in 2003, 2005 and 2019.

== Broadcasting ==
The band has appeared on TV (Top of the Pops) and radio. On TV in 1981 they accompanied Tony Capstick with "The Sheffield Grinder" / "Capstick Comes Home"; a partnership which saw them rise to number three in the UK singles chart.

== Personnel ==
The current Resident Musical Director is David Purkiss who joined the band in July 2022.

== Frickley South Elmsall Brass Band ==
Frickley South Elmsall Brass Band was formed in 1969 as the learner band to Carlton Main Frickley Colliery Band. Under the guidance of Robert Oughton, the aim was to train and supply players for the Championship band. Having obtained an old set of instruments through the CISWO organisation for miners, the first competition was entered in 1970 and 3rd prize obtained. Soon the band had registered in the 4th section of The National Brass Band Registry and entered competitions run under national rules.

With the involvement of parents and helpers the band became independent in 1976 and gained income by giving concerts at local venues such as Galas, Working Men’s Clubs and Parks along with fund raising raffles, coffee mornings and sponsored events.

The band gave free concerts for local charities and entertained the elderly, especially at Christmas. In 1980 it was granted a small levy paid by the NUM members of Frickley South Elmsall Colliery and this continued until the closure of the colliery in 1993.

With the closure of the colliery in 1993 a depression set in on the village. Community spirit was lost and people had no desire to try things other than work, thus very few took up the challenge of learning to play an instrument.

After a television programme in 1994 dealing with how mining communities were coping, and 21 appearances of the band on television in one year, including a trip to Germany, sponsorship from the local firm of Standard Fireworks was obtained, but after two years the recession in firework manufacture caused the closure of the factories and the end to the deal.

With the need to renew the now very old instruments a successful application was made to the Foundation of Sports and Arts (organised by the Pools Promoters Association) allowing five new instruments to be bought. A year later another successful grant from the Arts Council of England (Lottery) and the local EEC Re-generation Grant, enabled the rest of the instruments to be renewed.

== See also ==
- Grimethorpe Colliery Band - closely related to Carlton Main Colliery.
