= GUS Band =

- Brass Band
- Short name: GUS
- Former name: G.U.S. (Footwear), G.U.S. (Kettering), Great Universal, GUS (Footwear), GUS Kettering, Munn & Felton Works, Munn & Felton's (Footwear), Munn & Felton's Works, Munn and Felton Works, Munn and Feltons, Munn and Felton's Works, Rigid Containers Group, Rigid Containers GUS, Travelsphere Holidays, Travelsphere Holidays GUS, Virtuosi GUS Band
- Founded: 1933 (93 years ago)
- Location: Northampton, England
- Music director: Christopher Bond
- Website: thegusband.com

The GUS Band is a world-famous brass band, based in Kettering, England. Originally known as the Munn and Felton Works Band, it was formed by Fred Felton in 1933 in Kettering, England. Since then, the band has won many prizes and competitions over the years.

== History ==
On 2 January 1933, the Northamptonshire Evening Telegraph reported the formation of the 'Munn and Felton Works Brass Band'. In that article, Mr Fred Felton, co-managing director of the firm, said: "We are out to make it the finest combination in the country, and to make it a contesting band of note throughout the country". Two years later the new band were champions of Great Britain. Since then, under the names of Munn and Felton, GUS (Footwear), Rigid Containers Group Band, Travelsphere Holidays Band, Virtuosi GUS Band, and now The GUS Band, the band has travelled Britain, Europe and America, appearing in concert halls, on television and radio, and has released many records and CDs.

== Major honours ==
The band's contesting successes include winning 1 World Championship, 6 British National Championships, 2 British Open Championships, and 20 Midlands Championship titles.

| World Champions: | 1971 |
| National Champions of Great Britain: | 1935, 1955, 1957, 1960, 1964, 1966 |
| British Open Winners: | 1954, 1988 |
| Midlands Regional Champions: | 1946, 1947, 1957, 1960, 1963, 1964, 1996, 2001, 2004, 2010, 2011, 2014, 2015, 2016, 2017, 2018, 2020, 2023, 2025, 2026 |
| National Mineworkers Champions: | 2013, 2017 |
| All England International Masters Winners: | 2015, 2016 |
| Royal Trophy: | 1935, 1954, 1955, 2026 |
| National Quartet Champions: | 1966, 1967, 1968 |
| Dr Martin Wainstones Cup: | 2023, 2024 |

== Musical directors ==
The following list of resident and guest conductors is compiled from past contest results.

| Dates | Name |
|---|---|
| 1933–1938 | William Halliwell |
| 1946–1975 | Stanley Boddington MBE |
| 1955–1960 | Sir Harry Mortimer CBE |
| 1975–1978 | Geoffrey Brand |
| 1978–1985 | Dr Keith Wilkinson |
| 1985–1987 | John Berryman |
| 1985–1989 | Bramwell Tovey |
| 1988 | David Stowell |
| 1989–1990 | Robert Watson |
| 1991–1998 | John Berryman |
| 1998–2000 | Melvin White |
| 2001 | Frank Renton |
| 2002 | Brian Grant |
| 2003 | Russell Gray |
| 2003 | Major Peter Parkes |
| 2004–2007 | David Stowell |
| 2007 | Rob Wiffen OBE |
| 2007–2008 | Jeremy Wise |
| 2008–2013 | John Berryman |
| 2013–2018 | Adam Cooke |
| 2018-2022 | Chris Jeans |
| 2022-2025 | Dr David Thornton |
| 2023-present | Christopher Bond |

== Partial discography ==
The band has released over 50 albums, a selection of which are listed here:

- Christmas Fantasia - The Music of Andrew Wainwright
- Freeh-Way
- A Mingled Chime
- Bandology
- British Bandstand
- Bandstand (volumes 1 to 10)
- Brass in Perspective
- Celebration Golden Jubilee
- European Journey
- In a Tribute to Eric Ball
- Journeys in Brass
- Kings of Brass
- Rhapsody in Blue - with Don Lusher OBE Soloist
- Travelling Light
- The World Champions Play Test Pieces for Brass
- English Landscapes
- Around the World in Eighty Minutes
