= North American Brass Band Association =

The North American Brass Band Association (NABBA) is a governing body for British-style brass bands hosted in North America. In addition to promoting the development of brass band in North American, NABBA sponsors a yearly national competition.

The Brass Band Bridge is the official publication of the North American Brass Band Association (NABBA). The first issue was in 1980 and since then, it has been roughly a quarterly publication.

== Winners ==
=== Former sections ===
Year	Host city	Championship	Honors	Challenge	Explorer
1983	Raleigh, North Carolina	Smoky Mountain Brass Band	NC State University		
1984	West Chester, Pennsylvania	Gramercy Brass Orchestra	Sunshine Brass Band		
1985	York, Ontario	Gramercy Brass Orchestra	Sunshine Brass Band		
1986	Indianapolis, Indiana	Brass Band of Columbus	Sunshine Brass Band	NC State University	
1987	Dublin, Ohio	Brass Band of Columbus	WRAL British Brass Band (Note: This group is now known as the Triangle Brass Band.)	Eastern Iowa Brass Band	
1988	Hammonton, New Jersey	Brass Band of Columbus	WRAL British Brass Band	NC State University	
1989	Asheville, North Carolina	WRAL British Brass Band	Eastern Iowa Brass Band	NC State University	
1990	Pittsburgh, Pennsylvania	Brass Band of Columbus	Eastern Iowa Brass Band	Ohio Collegiate Brass Band (Note: This group is now known as the Central Ohio Brass Band.)	
1991	Cedar Rapids, Iowa	Brass Band of Columbus	Ohio Collegiate Brass	Milwaukee British Brass Band	
1992	Dublin, Ohio	Ohio Collegiate Brass Band	Eastern Iowa Brass Band	Varsity All-Star Brass Band	
1993	Washington, DC	Brass Band of Columbus	Sheldon Theatre Brass Band	Varsity All-Star Brass Band	
1994	Raleigh, North Carolina	Hawthorn City Brass Band	Illinois Brass Band	—	
1995	Toronto, Canada	The Brass Band of Columbus	Eastern Iowa Brass Band	Buffalo Silver Band	
1996	Dublin, Ohio	Illinois Brass Band	Dominion Brass Band	Cincinnati Brass Band	
1997	Red Wing, Minnesota	Illinois Brass Band	Eastern Iowa Brass Band	Cincinnati Brass Band	
1998	Lexington, Kentucky	Illinois Brass Band	All-Star Brass & Percussion	Prairie Brass Band	
1999	St. Charles, Illinois	Brass Band of Columbus	Cincinnati Brass Band	St. Louis Brass Band	
2000	Columbus, Ohio	Illinois Brass Band	Cincinnati Brass Band	Sunshine Brass Band	
2001	Washington, DC	Illinois Brass Band	St. Louis Brass Band	Spires Brass Band	
2002	Cincinnati, Ohio	Columbus/Illinois (Note: In 2002, there was a tie for first.)	Prairie Brass Band	Sunshine Brass Band	Varsity All-Star Brass Band
2003	Little Rock, Arkansas	Stavanger Brass Band	Cincinnati Brass Band	Spires Brass Band	—
2004	Charleston, West Virginia	Chicago Brass Band	James Madison University	New England Brass Band	Jericho Brass
2005	St. Charles, Illinois	Brass Band of Central Florida	James Madison University	Spires Brass Band	Brass Band of Central Illinois
2006	Louisville, Kentucky	Brass Band of Columbus	New England Brass	Georgia Brass Band	Brass Band of the Tri-State
2007	Louisville, Kentucky	Fountain City Brass Band	Central Ohio Brass Band	Massanutten Brass Band	Brass Band of the Tri-State
2008	Louisville, Kentucky	Fountain City Brass Band	Georgia Brass Band	Spires Brass Band	Brass Band of the Tri-State
2009	Louisville, Kentucky	Fountain City Brass Band	Central Ohio Brass Band	Natural State	Brass Band of the Tri-State

=== Current sections ===
Year	Host city	Championship	1st section	2nd section	3rd section
2010	Raleigh, North Carolina	Fountain City Brass Band	Central Ohio Brass Band	Spires Brass Band	Oakland University
2011	Grand Rapids, Michigan	Atlantic Brass Band	Central Ohio Brass Band	Natural State	Capital City Brass
2012	Cincinnati, Ohio	Atlantic Brass Band	Central Ohio Brass Band	Madison Brass Band	Bend in the River
2013	Cincinnati, Ohio	Princeton Brass Band	Five Lakes Brass Band	Chesapeake Silver Cornet Brass Band	Chapel Brass
2014	Grand Rapids, Michigan	Stavanger Brass Band	Oakland University	Weston Silver Band	Fountain City Youth Brass Academy
2015	Fort Wayne, Indiana	Fountain City Brass Band	Weston Silver Band	Dublin Silver Band	Chapel Brass
2016	Fort Wayne, Indiana	Fountain City Brass Band	Pike's Peak Brass Band	Capital City Brass Band	Milwaukee Festival Brass
2017	Fort Wayne, Indiana	Atlantic Brass Band	Weston Silver Band	Rockville Brass Band	Milwaukee Festival Brass
2018	Fort Wayne, Indiana	Fountain City Brass Band	San Antonio Brass Band	Rockville Brass Band	Triangle Brass Band
2019	Fort Wayne, Indiana	Fountain City Brass Band	Dublin Silver Band	Capital City Brass Band	Old Crown Brass Band
2020	Canceled due to the COVID-19 pandemic				
2021	Canceled due to the COVID-19 pandemic				
2022	Huntsville, Alabama	Fountain City Brass Band	Dallas Brass Band	Motor City Brass Band	Triangle Brass Band
2023	Huntsville, Alabama	Five Lakes Silver Band	Princeton Brass Band	San Francisco Brass Band	Jacksonville State University
2024	Huntsville, Alabama	James Madison University	San Francisco Brass Band	Massanutten Brass Band	Fountain City Youth Academy
2025	Fort Wayne, Indiana	Fountain City Brass Band	Dublin Silver Band	Massanutten Brass Band	Cherry Blossom Brass Band

=== Solo competition ===
As part of the annual competition, 11 different categories of solo contests are also held:

1. Adult High Brass Slow Melody – Any Age (Cornets, Flugelhorns & Tenor Horns only)
2. Adult High Brass Technical Work – Any Age (Cornets, Flugelhorns & Tenor Horns only)
3. Adult Low Brass Slow Melody – Any Age (Baritones, Trombones, Euphoniums & Tubas only)
4. Adult Low Brass Technical Work – Any Age (Baritones, Trombones, Euphoniums & Tubas only)
5. Adult High Brass Slow Melody ‐ Senior (Cornets, Flugelhorns & Tenor Horns only)
6. Adult High Brass Technical Work – Senior (Cornets, Flugelhorns & Tenor Horns only)
7. Adult Low Brass Slow Melody – Senior (Baritones, Trombones, Euphoniums & Tubas only)
8. Adult Low Brass Technical Work – Senior (Baritones, Trombones, Euphoniums & Tubas only)
9. Youth Brass Solo – must be 17 years of age or younger or enrolled in a primary or secondary school.
10. Adult Percussion Solo
11. Youth Percussion Solo – must be 17 years of age or younger or enrolled in a primary or secondary school.

Although each section is individually scored and winners are announced accordingly, the overall winner each year typically wins a brand new instrument donated by its manufacturer.

== Member bands ==
A list of the member bands as of 2024:

Band	Location	Website
Arkansas Musicworks Brass Band	Bentonville, Arkansas	—
Atlantic Brass Band	Rowan University, Glassboro, New Jersey	http://www.atlanticbrassband.org/
Brass Band of Central Florida	Orlando, Florida	http://www.brassbandofcentralflorida.org/
Brass of the Potomac	Washington, D.C.	http://www.brassofthepotomac.com/
Capital City Brass Band	Lansing, Michigan	http://www.ccbrassband.com/
Central Ohio Brass Band	Columbus, Ohio	http://www.centralohiobrass.org/
Chesapeake Silver Cornet Brass Band	Hockessin, Delaware	http://www.chesapeakebrassband.org/
Chicago Brass Band	Chicago, Illinois	http://www.chicagobrassband.org/
Colorado Brass	Denver, Colorado	https://www.coloradobrass.org/
Crossroads Brass Band	Franklin, Indiana	https://crossroadsbrass.org/
Dublin Silver Band	Columbus, Ohio	https://www.dublinbands.com/dublin-silver-band.html
Five Lakes Silver Band	Royal Oak, Michigan	http://www.fivelakessilverband.com/
Fountain City Brass Band	Kansas City, Missouri	http://www.fcbb.net/
Georgia Brass Band	Atlanta, Georgia	https://www.georgiabrassband.com/
Illinois Brass Band	Libertyville, Illinois	http://illinoisbrassband.org/
James Madison University Brass Band	Harrisonburg, Virginia	http://www.jmubrassband.org/
Madison Brass Band	Madison, Wisconsin	http://mbbweb.net/
Massanutten Brass Band	Harrisonburg, Virginia	http://www.massanuttenbrassband.org/
Milwaukee Festival Brass	Milwaukee, Wisconsin	http://www.mfbrass.org/
Motor City Brass Band	Southfield, Michigan	http://www.mcbb.org/
Oakland University Brass Band	Rochester, Michigan	—
Old Crown Brass Band	Fort Wayne, Indiana	http://www.oldcrownbrassband.org/
Pike's Peak Brass Band	Colorado Springs, Colorado	http://pikespeakbrassband.com/
Princeton Brass Band	Rider University, Lawrence Township, New Jersey	http://www.princetonbrassband.org/
River Brass	Newburgh, Indiana	http://www.riverbrass.com/
Rockville Brass Band	Rockville, Maryland	http://www.rockvillebrassband.org/
Smoky Mountain Brass Band	Asheville, North Carolina	https://smbrass.com/
Stavanger Brass Band	Stavanger, Norway	http://www.stavanger-brassband.com/
Tampa Brass Band	Tampa, Florida	https://www.tampabrassband.com
Triangle Brass Band	Raleigh, North Carolina	https://trianglebrass.org/
Weston Silver Band	Toronto, Ontario	http://westonsilverband.ca/

== See also ==
- Great American Brass Band Festival
