= Fairey Band =

British brass band

The Fairey Band
- Formation: 1937
- Type: Brass band
- Headquarters: Sir Richard Fairey Road, Heaton Chapel, Stockport SK4 5DY
- Musical Director: Phil Chalk
- Parent organization: Fairey Aviation Company
- Affiliations: WFEL
- Website: faireyband.com

The Fairey Band is a brass band based in Heaton Chapel in Stockport, Greater Manchester. The band has achieved fame in modern music circles with its appearances playing Acid Brass although they still play traditional brass band music and participate each year in the Whit Friday Brass Band contests.

Its name comes from Sir Richard Fairey and the Fairey Aviation Company, famous in later years for the Fairey Delta 2 aircraft – the first aircraft in level flight to exceed 1,000 mph, and had an important contribution to the shape of Concorde and its drooped nose. An early signature tune for the band was Beaufighters, after a fighter aircraft Bristol Beaufighter made at Fairey in Heaton Chapel (and elsewhere) for "Ministry of Aircraft Production".

== Fairey Aviation ==
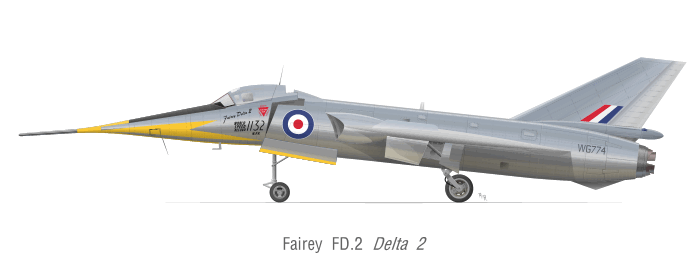
The Fairey Delta 2

The band was formed in 1937 as the Fairey Aviation Works Band by workers at the aircraft factory. This was at a time when the company was producing aircraft that would see plenty of action in the first few weeks of World War II, although sadly few of its aircraft would be of sufficient calibre to pose a real threat to German aircraft. Its aircraft, especially the old-fashioned yet versatile and destructive Fairey Swordfish, mainly carried torpedoes for the Fleet Air Arm. Fairey were taken over by Westland Aircraft of Yeovil, chiefly due to its innovative Fairey Rotodyne. The band's name was shortened to the Fairey Band in the 1960s and changed to the Fairey Engineering Works Band in the late 1970s.

== Sponsorship ==
The band became known as the Williams Fairey Engineering Band when Fairey Engineering Ltd was taken over by Williams Holdings in 1986. In the mid-1990s, the band shortened its name to the Williams Fairey Band. In 2000 Williams Holdings was broken up and Williams Fairey Engineering was spun off into the Kidde plc fire safety company, although the band retained the Williams Fairey name. The sponsorship by Kidde finished at the end of 2002. In 2003, they were sponsored by FP (Music), a subsidiary of Fosters Partners (Asia), and the band's releases reflected this with the name Fairey FP (Music) Band. At the beginning of 2010 the band acquired a new sponsorship in the shape of the British brass instrument maker Geneva Instruments and became known as the Fairey (Geneva) Brass Band. This arrangement ceased during 2011 whence the band reverted to its original name of the Fairey Band.

Although no longer sponsored, the band still use the same bandroom location, where rehearsals take place. The road has now been named after Sir Richard Fairey (see address in panel).

== Contest record ==
On Whit Friday over a hundred brass bands take part in a day of brass band contesting at a number of venues around Tameside and Saddleworth. These results do not contribute to world rankings. For each of these two areas bands are placed at each venue and then placed for each area. Recently Fairey have concentrated in playing around the Saddleworth Area Whit Friday brass venues and have obtained the following placings:

Saddleworth: 2016:2nd. 2015:1st 2014:3rd 2013:2nd

Tameside: 2012:2nd 2011:2nd 2010:1st

The band has been successful at the major national contests since its inception in 1937, however this was curtailed following the loss of company sponsorship in 2002. Following several lean contesting years, and a considerable rebuilding process, 2010 saw a remarkable resurgence in the band's fortunes. They achieved overall victory in the Tameside Whit Friday competitions and an invitation to the 2011 European Brass Band Championship in Montreux due to their victory at the 2010 English National Brass Band Championship. They placed 6th at Montreux. Further success followed with runners up spots at the 2010 British Open and Brass in Concert Championships, and a 3rd place at the National Championship finals at London's Albert Hall.

Full contest winning record:

National Champions of Great Britain: 1945, 1952, 1954, 1956, 1965, 1986, 1993, 2002, 2003

British Open Champions: 1941, 1942, 1945, 1947, 1949, 1950, 1956, 1961, 1962, 1963, 1965, 1979, 1987, 1993, 1998

English National Champions: 2010

All England Masters Champions: 1996, 1997

European Champions: 1994

Brass in Concert Champions: 1996

North West Area Champions: 1947, 1951, 1952, 1954, 1959, 1963, 1978, 1980, 1984, 1986, 1992, 1996, 1997, 2001, 2014, 2015

BBC Television Champion Brass: 1976, 1977, 1979

BBC Best of Brass: 1978

Granada Television Band of the Year: 1979, 1980

BBC Radio Band of the Year: 1987, 1988

== Musical directors ==
- Harry Mortimer
- Leonard Lamb
- Kenneth Dennison
- Walter Hargreaves
- Roy Newsome
- Major Peter Parkes
- James Gourlay
- Howard Snell
- Alan Withington
- Simon Stonehouse
- Philip Chalk
- Russell Gray
- Garry Cutt

== See also ==
- Acid Brass

== Video clips ==
- Collection of clips
- Festmusic der Stadt Wien with Fairey's history
- Festival at Delph in 1998.
- Acid Brass at the Innocent Drinks Village Fete in 2007.
- Innocent Village Fete in 2007 with the Blaydon Races in Regent's Park.
