= Philip Sparke =

English composer (born 1951)

Phillip Sparke
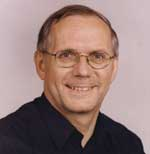
- Philip Sparke (1991)
- Born: Phillip Allen Sparke; 29 December 1951 (age 74); London, England
- Occupations: Composer, musician
- Years active: 1973–present

Philip Allen Sparke (born 29 December 1951) is an English composer and musician born in London, noted for his concert band and brass band music. His early major works include The Land of the Long White Cloud – "Aotearoa", written for the 1980 Centennial New Zealand Brass Band championship. He subsequently went on to win the EBU New Music for Band Competition three times, including in 1986 with a commission from the BBC called Orient Express.

Since May 2000, his music has been published under his own label Anglo Music Press, and distributed by Hal Leonard.

== Notable achievements ==
- 1997 Sudler Prize - Dance Movements
- 2000 Iles Medal of the Worshipful Company of Musicians - Services to brass bands
- 2005 National Band Association/William D. Revelli Memorial Band Composition Contest - Music of the Spheres
- 2011 BUMA International Brass Award - Contributions to brass music
- 2016 National Band Association/William D. Revelli Memorial Band Composition Contest - A Colour Symphony
- 2018 International Award - Midwest International Band and Orchestra Clinic

== Works ==
=== Music for Wind Band and Brass Band ===
- 1973/1976 Gaudium
- 1975 The Prizewinners for Brass-Band
- 1978/1995 Fantasy for Euphonium
- 1979/1985 A Concert Prelude
- 1979 Capriccio (E-flat Cornet Solo) for Brass-Band
- 1979/1987 The Land of the Long White Cloud "Aotearoa"
- 1981 A Tameside Overture for Brass-Band
- 1981 Fanfare, Romance & Finale for Brass-Band
- 1981 Song and Dance (Cornet Solo) for Brass-Band
- 1982 Barn Dance & Cowboy Hymn for Brass-Band
- 1983 Rhythm and Blues for Brass-Band
- 1984 Aubade (Euphonium Solo) for Brass-Band
- 1984 Jubilee-Overture
- 1984 A London Overture for Brass-Band
- 1984 A Malvern Suite for Brass-Band
- 1984 Slipstream (Concert-March)
- 1984/1985 The Year of the Dragon
  1. Toccata
  2. Interlude
  3. Finale
- 1985 A Celtic Suite for Brass-Band
  1. Dawns Werin
  2. Suo Gan
  3. Men of Harlech
- 1985 Masquerade (E-flat Horn Solo) for Brass-Band
- 1985/1987 Music for a Festival
  1. Con brio
  2. Andantino
  3. Vivo
- 1985 Skyrider (Concert-March) for Brass-Band
- 1986/1992 Orient Express
- 1986/1994 Pantomime (Euphonium Solo)
- 1986 Party Piece (Euphonium Solo) for Brass-Band
- 1986 Prelude, Toccata & Fugue (Graduation Day) for Brass-Band
- 1986 Variations on an Enigma for Brass-Band
- 1987 Flying the Breeze
- 1987 Mountain Song for Brass-Band
- 1988 A Swiss Festival Overture
- 1988 Concertino for Tuba (E-flat Tuba Solo) for Brass-Band
- 1988 Concerto Grosso (Brass Quartet & Band) for Brass-Band
- 1988 Endeavour (Australia 1788–1988) a Programmatic Rhapsody for Brass-Band
  1. The unknown continent
  2. Terra Australis
  3. The new challenge
- 1988 River City Serenade for Brass-Band
- 1988 Serenade for Toni
- 1989 Partita for Brass-Band
- 1989 The sunken village for Fanfare Orchestra
- 1989 A Tameside Overture
- 1989 Theatre Music
  1. Overture
  2. Entr'acte
  3. Finale
- 1989 The Vikings
- 1989/1990 Two-part Invention (Euphonium Duet)
- 1990 Cambridge Variations for Brass-Band
- 1990 Fanfare, Romance, Finale
- 1990/1992 A Pittsburgh Overture
- 1990 Sinfonietta Nr. 1
  1. Overture
  2. Aria
  3. Scherzo
- 1990 Triptych for Brass-Band
- 1990 A Yorkshire Overture
- 1991 Celebration
- 1991 Concerto for Trumpet or Cornet for Brass-Band
- 1992 Euphonism (Euphonium Duet) for Brass-Band
- 1992 Jamaica Farewell
- 1992/1996 Jubilee-Prelude
- 1992 Serenade for Horns (E-flat Horn Trio) for Brass-Band
- 1992 Festival Overture
- 1992 Mountain Song
- 1992 Mambo Jumbo
- 1992 River City Serenade
- 1992 Sinfonietta Nr. 2
  1. Overture
  2. Serenade
  3. Finale
- 1992 Soliloquy (Cornet Solo) for Brass-Band
- 1993 Processional Overture
- 1993 Song for Ina (Euphonuim Solo) for Brass-Band
- 1993 Tijuana Trumpets (Trumpet feature)
- 1994 Three Miniatures for Brass-Band
- 1995 Dance Movements
  1. Ritmico
  2. Molto vivo (for Woodwinds)
  3. Lento (for the Brass)
  4. Molto ritmico
- 1995 Euphonium Concerto No 1 for Brass-Band
- 1996 Fiesta
- 1996 White Rose Overture
- 1996 Music for Arosa
- 1997 Norwegian Rondo
- 1997 Time to Say Goodbye for Brass-Band
- 1998 Between the Moon and Mexico for Brass-Band
- 1998 Diversions – Variations on a Swiss Folk Song "Der Heimetvogel"
  1. Theme
  2. Variation 1 (Vivo e scherzando)
  3. Variation 2 (Subito meno mosso)
  4. Variation 3 (Lento espressivo)
  5. Variation 4 (Vivace)
- 1999 Earth, Water, Sun, Wind Symphony for Band
  Commissioned by the Northern Arizona University Wind Symphony for their Centennial Celebration
  1. Earth
  2. Water
  3. Sun
  4. Wind
- 1999 Hanover Festival
  Commissioned by the Hanover Wind Symphony for their Fifteenth Anniversary
- 1999 Lindisfarne Rhapsody (Flute Solo)
- 1999 Tallis Variations for Brass-Band
- 1999 Wilten Festival Overture
- 2000 The Centurion for Brass-Band
- 2000 Five Festive Fanfares
- 2000 Navigation Inn (Concert March)
- 2000 Overture for Woodwinds (woodwind orchestra)
- 2000 Time Remembered
- 2000 To a New Dawn
- 2001 Carol of the Shepherds
- 2001 Ballad for Benny
- 2001 Four Norfolk Dances
  1. Pulham Prelude
  2. Diss Dance
  3. Lopham Lament
  4. Garboldisham Gigue
- 2001 Infinity and Beyond...
- 2001 Invictus (The Unconquered)
- 2001 A London Intrada
- 2001 Navigation Inn for Brass-Band
- 2001 The Prince of Denmark's March
- 2001 Shalom! (Suite of Israeli Folk Songs)
  1. V'ha'ir Shushan & Havdala
  2. Hanerot Halalu & Ba'olam Haba
  3. Mishenichnas Adar, Ani Purim & Yom Tov Lanu
- 2001 South Down Pictures for Brass-Band
- 2001 Sunrise at Angel's Gate
- 2001 Te Deum Prelude
- 2001 Time Remembered for Brass-Band
- 2001 Two Norwegian Folk Tunes
- 2002 Alladale from Hymn of the Highlands (Flugel, Horn and Baritone Trio) for Brass-Band
- 2002 Big Sky Ouverture
- 2002 Mary's Boy Child
- 2002 Merry-Go-Round
- 2002 Morning Song – for Horn Quartet and Band
- 2002 Pathfinders March
- 2002 Portrait of a City
- 2002 Sinfonietta No 3 (Rheinfelden Sketches)
  1. Promenade
  2. Ballad
  3. Interlude
  4. Scherzo
- 2002/2003 Suite from "Hymn of the Highlands"
  1. Ardross Castle
  2. Alladale
  3. Dundonnell
- 2002 Flowerdale from "Hymn of the Highlands" (Soprano Cornet Solo) for Brass-Band
- 2002 Lairg Muir from "Hymn of the Highlands" (Cornet Solo) for Brass-Band
- 2002 Strathcarron from "Hymn of the Highlands" (Sword Dance) for Brass-Band
- 2002 Summer Isles from "Hymn of the Highlands" (Euphonium Solo) for Brass-Band
- 2002 The White Rose
- 2003 Aria (Tenor Horn Solo) for Brass-Band
- 2003 Clarinet Calypso
- 2003 Clarinet Concerto
- 2003 A Huntingdon Celebration
  Commissioned by the Huntingdonshire Concert Band to celebrate their 10th Anniversary
- 2003 Kaleidoscope – Five Variations on the "Brugg Song"
  1. Introduction
  2. Theme
  3. Variation I
  4. Variation II
  5. Variation III
  6. Variation IV
  7. Variation V
- 2003 Masquerade (A Willisau Celebration)
  1. Overture
  2. Elegy
  3. Interlude
  4. Finale
- 2003 Out of the Darkness, Into the Light
- 2003 Prelude and Scherzo (Trombone solo) for Brass-Band
- 2003 Simple Sarabande
- 2003 Ten Chorale Preludes
- 2003 Veni Immanuel
- 2003 Westminster Prelude
- 2004 Between the two Rivers
- 2004 Choral and Variations
- 2004 A Klezmer Karnival
- 2004 Flying the Breeze
- 2004 Harlequin (Euphonium Solo)
- 2004 La Caracolá
- 2004 Mandalen Landscapes
- 2004 Manhattan (Trumpet Solo)
- 2004 Marchissimo
- 2004 Music of the Spheres for Brass-Band
  1. t = 0 – Big Bang
  2. The Lonely Planet
  3. Asteroids and Shooting Stars
  4. Music of the Spheres
  5. Harmonia
  6. The Unknown
- 2004/2005 Portrait of a Music
- 2004 Postcard from Singapore
- 2004 Summer Scene for Brass-Band
- 2004 The Bandwagon for Brass-Band
- 2004 The Four Noble Truths
  1. Dukkha
  2. Samudaya
  3. Nirodha
  4. Magga
- 2005 Jeanie with the Light Brown Hair
- 2005 Jubilate for Brass-Band
- 2005 The Painted Desert
- 2005 The Pioneers
- 2005 Variants on an English Hymn Tune (Euphonium Solo)
- 2005 In The Bleak Mid-Winter (Re-arg)
- 2005 When the Spirit Soars
- 2006 Valerius Variations
- 2006 Tuba Concerto
- 2006 Trombone Concerto
- 2006 Madrigalum
- 2006 Dances and Alleluias for Brass Band
- 2006 Parade Of The Clockwork Soldiers
- 2007 Albion Heritage for wind ensemble
  Commissioned by The Association for Music in International Schools (AMIS) for the 2008 International Honor Band. World premier on 15 March 2008 in London, UK, at the AMIS 2008 International Band and Choir Festival.
- Harmony Music for Brass-Band
- 2007 Legend of Celobrium commissioned by the Harmonie de Soleuvre, Luxembourg, to celebrate their 100th Anniversary
- 2007 A Monmouth Overture commissioned for Monmouth School Symphonic Wind band
- 2007 Tales of the River Wye commissioned for Monmouth School Junior Symphonic Wind Band
- 2007 Music for Battle Creek for Brass-Band
- 2007 Symphonic Metamorphosis on Themes from Saint-Saëns' 3rd Symphony
- 2008 Letter From Home commissioned by the James Madison University Brass Band, Harrisonburg, VA
- 2008 The Roaring Forties for wind ensemble
- 2009 Neapolitan Holiday for wind ensemble
  Commissioned by the Green Hope High School Symphonic Band and Wind Ensemble directed by Brian Myers. World premier on 21 May 2009 at the Meymandi Concert Hall in Raleigh, North Carolina, United States.
- 2009 A Winter's Tale for concert band
  Commissioned by the Western Plains Wind Consortium, Daniel Baldwin, Founder and Director. World premiere on 1 December 2009 at the OPSU Centennial Theatre by the Oklahoma Panhandle State University Concert Band, under the direction of Dr. Matthew C. Saunders in Goodwell, Oklahoma, United States.
- 2010 "Atlantic Odyssey" for concert band
  Commissioned by the Oakton High School Bands of Vienna, Virginia, United States. World premiere by director Dr. Cheryl Newton at Oakton High School on 12 June 2010 by the Oakton High School Symphonic Band.
- 2010 "March Celebration" for concert band
  Commissioned by the Harmonie royale des sapeurs-pompiers d'Athus Bands of Athus, Belgium. World premiere on 23 October 2010 for the 135th anniversary of the Harmonie royale des sapeurs-pompiers d'Athus under the direction of Dr.Jean-Luc Becker at Centre Clemarais by the town's bands.
- 2011 "Evolution: Five States of Change" for Brass Band
- 2014 "A Colour Symphony" - Symphony No.3
  Commissioned by the "sinfonischen blasorchester wehdel", Thomas Ratzek, conductor, with funds provided by Stiftung Niedersächsischer Volksbanken und Raiffeisenbanken and Volksbank eG Bremerhaven-Cuxland. They gave the premiere on 22 November 2014 in the Stadttheater Bremerhaven, in the presence of the composer.
- 2014 Wind Sketches
  Commissioned by the Tacoma Concert Band from Washington State, USA.
  1. Trade Winds
  2. Becalmed
  3. Riding the Storm
- 2017 "Festival Prelude 'AD Excel'"
  Commissioned by the AD Concert Band to celebrate their 40th anniversary, by musical director Dr Trevor Farren.
- 2017 Slavonika! Three Slavonic Dances for Woodwind Ensemble. Commissioned by Shea Lolin and the Bloomsbury Woodwind Ensemble. Premiered on 25 November 2017 at St John’s, Waterloo

=== National Championships of Great Britain test pieces ===
A number of Philip Sparke's compositions have been chosen as test pieces in the National Brass Band Championships of Great Britain. His pieces have been selected for various sections, both at the area contests and the national finals.

Year	Piece	Section	R/N	Winning Band(s)	Ref
1985	A Malvern Suite	4th	R	Horsham Borough (L&SC); South Leicester and Desford B (Mids N); Amington (Mids S); Lanchester (NoE); Llanrug & District (NW); Irvine Youth (Sco); Abertillery & District Youth (Wal); Royal British Legion Crownhill (Plymouth) (WoE); Hambleton Brass (Yorks)	
1987	Harmony Music	Ch	N	Desford Colliery Dowty	
1990	Music for a Festival	3rd	N	Blidworth Welfare	
1991	Triptych	3rd	R	Wantage Silver A (L&SC); Ifton Welfare (Mids); Langbaurgh (NoE); Flixton MCR (NW); Kelty & Blairadam Brass (Sco); Deiniolen (Wal N); British Steel (Port Talbot) (Wal S); Stinchcombe (WoE); Aceprint Gawthorpe Victoria (Yorks)	
1992	A London Overture	1st	N	British Telecom	
1993	A Celtic Suite	3rd	N	Skelmanthorpe	
1994	Partita	Ch	R	Regent Brass (L&SC); William Davis Construction Group (Mids); Ever Ready (NoE); BNFL Leyland Band (NW); CWS (Glasgow) (Sco); Cory (Wal); Flowers Band (WoE); Yorkshire Building Society Hammonds (Yorks)	
1995	The Land of the Long White Cloud "Aotearoa"	1st	R	City of Cambridge (L&SC); Rolls-Royce (Mids); EYMS Band (NoE); United Northwest Co-operative (Rochdale) (NW); Bon Accord Silver (Sco); Beaumaris (Wal); Swindon Pegasus Brass (WoE); Stocksbridge Engineering Steels (Yorks)	
1996	A Malvern Suite	4th	N	Manx Concert	
1998	Between the Moon and Mexico	Ch	N	Brighouse & Rastrick	
1998	Three Miniatures	3rd	N	Oldham Brass 97	
2000	Variations on an Enigma	Ch	R	Aveley & Newham (L&SC); Desford Colliery (Mids); Ever Ready (NoE); Fodens Courtois (NW); CWS (Glasgow) (Sco); Buy As You View Cory (Wal); Flowers (WoE); Yorkshire Building Society (Yorks)	
2001	Diversions – Variations on a Swiss Folk Song "Der Heimetvogel"	2nd	N	Ammanford Town	
2004	Kaleidoscope – Five Variations on the "Brugg Song"	2nd	R	Becontree Brass (L&SC); Hathern (Mids); Ellington Colliery (NoE); Old Hall Brass (NW); Barrhead Burgh (Sco); Llanrug (Wal); Otterbourne Brass (WoE); Yorkshire Building Society Concert (Yorks)	
2004	The Four Noble Truths	4th	N	Potters Bar	
2006	Valerius Variations	4th	N	Dodworth Colliery M.W.	
2007	Music for Battle Creek	Ch	N	Grimethorpe Colliery	
2008	The Saga of Haakon the Good	1st	N	Seindorf Beaumaris	
2010	Symphonic Metamorphosis on Themes from Saint-Saëns' 3rd Symphony	4th	R	Battle Town (L&SC); Shipston Town (Mids); Stape Silver (NoE); Hazel Grove (NW); Dumfries Town (Sco); Crwbin (Wal); Test Valley Brass (WoE); Worsbrough Brass (Yorks)	
2011	Portrait of a City	2nd	N	Brunel Brass	
2013	Harmony Music	Ch	R	Regent Brass (L&SC); Jaguar Land Rover (Mids); NASUWT Riverside (NoE); Leyland (NW); Whitburn (Sco); Tongwynlais Temperance (Wal); Flowers (WoE); Carlton Main Frickley Colliery (Yorks)	
2013	A Malvern Suite	4th	N	Ebbw Valley Brass	
2017	The Land of the Long White Cloud "Aotearoa"	1st	R	TBD	
2020	A Tale As Yet Untold	Ch	R	N/A (L&SC); GUS (Mids); NASUWT Riverside (NoE); Fodens (NW); The Cooperation Band (Sco); Tredegar (Wal); Camborne Town (WoE); Black Dyke (Yorks)	
