= Christopher Bond (composer) =

British composer

- Born: 5 April 1992; Camborne, Cornwall
- Occupation: Composer
- Website: www.christopherbondmusic.co.uk

Christopher Bond (born Cornwall 1992) is a British composer particularly noted for his brass band compositions.

== Early life and education ==
Christopher grew up in the town of Camborne in Cornwall. There, he started his education in music, learning the piano and cornet from a young age. Christopher attended Camborne Science and International Academy before undertaking his A-Levels at Truro and Penwith College.

At the age of 18, Christopher moved to Cardiff and studied composition at the Royal Welsh College of Music and Drama from where he graduated in 2014.

== Career ==
Christopher is Composer in Residence to the number one ranked brass band in the world, Cory Band. In addition to his work with Cory Band, he has written for many of the world's leading brass bands, including Grimethorpe Colliery Band, Brighouse and Rastrick Brass Band, Leyland Band and Brassband Willebroek.

Solo commissions include Owen Farr, Stephen Sykes, Brett Baker, Tom Hutchinson, Steve Stewart, Lode Violet, and a work for Eminence Brass Quartet, comprising members of the Black Dyke Band, Cory Band and London Symphony Orchestra. His work has been performed at many locations in the United Kingdom, including at Wales Millennium Centre, Regent Hall, Durham International Festival of Brass, the RNCM Festival of Brass and during the BBC Welsh Proms at St David's Hall as well as radio broadcasts both locally and nationally on BBC Radio 2, BBC Radio 3 and Classic FM.

In 2012, his work 'Islands in the Sky' was premiered at the International Tuba Euphonium Conference in Linz, Austria. In the same year, 'The Diamond Jubilee Fanfare' was commissioned and performed in the presence of Elizabeth II and Prince Philip, Duke of Edinburgh. More recently in 2015, his work 'Aristotle's Air' won the Composition Prize at Brass in Concert, held at Sage Gateshead. The same work was performed by Brassband Willebroek and the National Band of New Zealand at the 2017 World Music Contest in Kerkrade.

Christopher wrote and compiled the soundtrack for 'Magic in the Skies', the annual summer season of firework displays held at Land's End in Cornwall, featuring the voice of Miriam Margolyes. The music has been used since 2014.

His first commission came at the age of sixteen, when he won a competition to write a fanfare for the Cornwall Youth Brass Band to open their fifty-year course anniversary concert. Since then, he has written a further work for the same band, in dedication and performed in the presence of Cornish composer, the late Goff Richards.

In 2019, Christopher's work 'Corineus' was selected as the test piece in the championship section of the National Youth Brass Band Championships of Great Britain. This followed in 2020 with his work 'Neverland' selected as the test piece in the fourth section of the Regional Championships of the National Championships of Great Britain, where it was subsequently performed by brass bands across Great Britain.
