= Luton brass band =

English community brass band in Luton, Bedfordshire

Luton Brass Band
- Brass band
- Founded: October 2019
- Location: Luton, Bedfordshire, England
- Music director: Adam Janes
- Website: www.lutonbrassband.com

Luton Brass Band is an English community brass band based in Luton, Bedfordshire. Formed in late 2019 to re-establish a civic brass band presence in the town following the dissolution of the historic Luton Band at the turn of the 21st century, the ensemble performs at municipal concerts, regional bandstands, charity fundraisers, and civic commemorations.

== History ==
=== Predecessor bands (1883–1999) ===
Luton's brass banding tradition dates to 1883, when several members of the Ashton Road Mission Band formed a competing ensemble known as the Luton Red Cross Band (named in reference to St George's Cross rather than the international humanitarian organisation). Early conductors and trainers included J. T. Ogden (1894–1896), who guided the band to first place at the Agricultural Hall in London, and John Gladney, who led the band at its 1896 Belle Vue debut. By the early 20th century, the ensemble (later also billed as Deritend Luton Band and Luton Band) had established an intense regional rivalry with St Albans City Band and recruited the Mortimer family from Hebden Bridge, including bandmaster Fred Mortimer and his sons Harry and Alex, supported by patronage from Lady Zia Wernher of Luton Hoo.

On 29 September 1923, competing under professional conductor William Halliwell, the Luton Red Cross Band won the National Brass Band Championships of Great Britain at Crystal Palace performing Henry Geehl's Oliver Cromwell, becoming the first brass band from southern England to win the Thousand Guinea Trophy. The morning after the contest, the band recorded extracts of Oliver Cromwell on a 78 rpm Winner disc before performing at the London Palladium and Finsbury Park Empire, and was later honoured with a civic reception in Luton. Following the Mortimer family's move to Foden's Band in 1924–1925, leadership passed to long-serving bandsmen including Ted Carter, Ernie Davis, and repiano cornetist Albert Coupe.

In 1931, Luton Band appeared in the British comedy film Up for the Cup, directed by Jack Raymond. Fred Mortimer returned as conductor from 1937 to 1946, followed by Albert Coupe from 1947 to 1958, maintaining the band's Championship Section standing and securing multiple London and Southern Counties titles. In April 1972, the ensemble won the Championship Section of the W. D. & H. O. Wills Brass Band Championships. Later conductors included Robert Howard, Lyn Morgan (1977–1984), under whom the band won the 1980 London and Southern Counties Championship and appeared on BBC Television's Best of Brass, followed by David Barron and Phillip Littlemore, who led the band to an Open Section victory at the 1997 Aylesbury Contest before departing in 1999. The historic band disbanded at the turn of the 21st century, leaving Luton without a town brass band for nearly two decades.

=== Formation and early performances (2019–2023) ===
In October 2019, Luton Brass Band was founded as a non-contesting, non-auditioned community ensemble open to brass and percussion players of varying experience levels. Following delays caused by the COVID-19 pandemic, the band gave its first public performance at Dunstable Bandstand in July 2021 and inaugurated an annual winter carolling programme across Luton later that year.

In April 2022, the ensemble took part in the opening celebrations for the Luton Rotary Bandstand in Wardown Park. Later that year, the band performed at the inaugural Stopsley Christmas lights switch-on alongside former Luton Town footballer Ricky Hill in November, and played seasonal music at the Luton and Dunstable University Hospital "Light up a Life" Christmas tree ceremony in December.

In May 2023, Luton Brass Band performed at Wandon Park for Luton's community celebrations marking the Coronation of Charles III and Camilla. In December 2023, the ensemble held its first joint choral concert, collaborating with the Vauxhall Luton Male Voice Choir and Dagnall Community Choir.

=== Workshops, broadcasts, and concerts ===
In April 2024, Cory Band musical director Philip Harper conducted a full-day masterclass with the ensemble, followed in May 2024 by the band's first solo concert at St Augustine's Church, Luton, and a June 2024 summer concert at Wardown Park. In November 2024, members of the band appeared live on BBC Radio 1 during presenter Greg James' programme alongside guest actor Dwayne Johnson.

Throughout 2025, Luton Brass Band featured in commemorations marking the 80th anniversaries of VE Day and VJ Day, including a June 2025 "Victory in Europe" concert at Wardown Bandstand with vintage vocalist Fiona Harrison, which raised over £1,000 for the Royal British Legion.

== Organisation and leadership ==
Operating as a self-funded community organisation supported by member subscriptions, Luton Brass Band rehearses at St Augustine's Church in Luton and performs a repertoire spanning traditional brass band marches and classics, film themes, swing, jazz, and seasonal carols.

- Musical Director: Adam Janes
- Chair Person: Luke Edmonds
- Secretary: Scott Brimley
