= Robert Bernat =

American composer

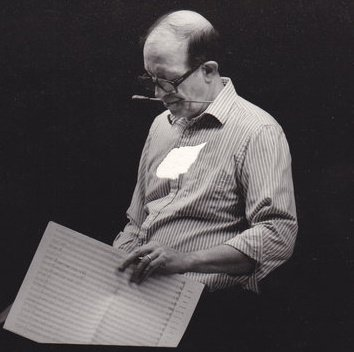

Background information
- Born: Robert Bernat; July 3, 1931; Johnstown, Pennsylvania, U.S.
- Died: December 3, 1994 (aged 63) Pennsylvania
- Genre: Brass band
- Occupations: Composer, conductor
- Instruments: Fiddle, Clarinet, Saxophone, Violin, Piano
- Years active: 1966–1994
- Formerly of: River City Brass Band

Robert Bernat (July 3, 1931 – December 3, 1994) was an American composer and the founder, artistic director, and conductorof the River City Brass Band in Pittsburgh, Pennsylvania. His musical influences included his mentor, Aaron Copland, as well as other American composers including Leonard Bernstein, George Gershwin, and John Philip Sousa.

== Biography ==
Bernat was born in Johnstown, Pennsylvania, on July 3, 1931, to Pearl Willie and Andrew Bernat. His mother died when he was four. That same year, his maternal grandfather taught him to play the country fiddle. By the time he was a teenager, he was playing the clarinet and saxophone professionally in jazz bands. At 15, he composed his first sonata for violin and piano. He obtained his undergraduate degree from Carnegie Mellon University (then, Carnegie Tech) in Pittsburgh, Pennsylvania, and his Master of Fine Arts in Composition from Brandeis University.

In 1960, Bernat received a Crofts fellowship to attend the Boston Symphony Orchestra's Tanglewood Music Center in the Berkshires where he studied with composer Aaron Copland. He held academic posts at Bethany College, Brandeis University, Ohio State University and the University of Pittsburgh before finding a permanent teaching home in the music department at Indiana University of Pennsylvania. In 1966, the Pittsburgh Symphony Orchestra commissioned him to compose In Memoriam: John F. Kennedy, a tribute to the late president. The piece was premiered on November 25, 1966. In the program notes, Bernat stated, "I tried to build the kind of piece that would be accessible to as many listeners as possible without compromising my own musical ideals." This musical philosophy was a common thread throughout Bernat's career. The Louisville Orchestra later recorded In Memoriam as part of their first edition series. From 1971-1972, Bernat was a Woodrow Wilson Fellow at California Institute of the Arts in Los Angeles, California where he studied electronic music. When he returned to Pennsylvania, he served as executive director of the Pennsylvania Council for the Arts from 1972 through 1975.

=== Composer and Brass Band ===
Bernat was commissioned in 1976 by British composer Elgar Howarth to write his first brass band composition, Dunlap's Creek. The Grimethorpe Colliery Band premiered the piece in Uniontown, Pennsylvania, and in New York City as part of the United States Bicentennial celebrations. Composing Dunlap's Creek inspired Bernat to learn more about these bands which enjoy great popularity in United Kingdom. In September 1978, he was the first composer selected by the state of Pennsylvania and the National Endowment for the Arts to participate in an arts exchange program with the United Kingdom. He moved to Sheffield, England, for almost a year to study brass bands up close. He was so impressed by the bands' combination of musical virtuosity and accessibility that he made up his mind to bring the brass band movement to the US.

He began to execute his plan in 1980 in Pittsburgh, Pennsylvania. The Steel City was not only a perfect base for this blue collar music (traditionally the musicians were coal miners and mill workers), it also offered a deep pool of musical talent. In 1981, the River City Brass Band (RCBB) gave its debut performance at Pittsburgh's Carnegie Music Hall. Bernat served as the RCBB's conductor, artistic director and president. Under his direction, the RCBB's musicians brought a variety of music — everything from traditional marches and Broadway tunes to newly commissioned works—to Pittsburgh audiences.

During performances, Bernat would tell anecdotes about the various pieces and composers and encouraged audiences to join in for sing-a-longs. Bernat was diagnosed with lung cancer in May 1994. With the RCBB in its 15th season, Bernat handed over his baton to cornet player, Denis Colwell, but continued to work behind the scenes to ensure that his artistic vision was properly executed. He died on December 3, 1994, at the age of 63 in his home. His legacy continues today as the River City Brass Band (now River City Brass) plays nationally and internationally under the direction of conductor and artistic director, James Gourlay, an internationally renowned tuba player and former conductor of the Grimethorpe Colliery Band.

=== Personal ===
Bernat married Edwinna Bossler, a fellow Johnstown native, in 1954, and they had three daughters, Brenda, Rebecca (Becky), and June Elizabeth (Betsy). He eventually married four times. The former Nancy Buttermore was his wife at the time of his death.

== Awards and honors ==
- Woodrow Wilson Fellow (1971)
- Man of the Year in Arts and Music, City of Pittsburgh (1989)
- Honorary Doctorate of the Arts, Washington & Jefferson College (1990)
- Achievement Award, City of Johnstown (1992)
- Composer's Radio Award, BMI, "Woodwind Quartet"
