= River City Brass Band =

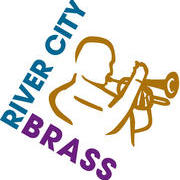

Background information
- Also known as: River City Brass, RCB
- Origin: Pittsburgh, Pennsylvania, United States
- Genres: Brass band, big band
- Years active: 1981–present
- Members: General Director; James Gourlay Operations Director; Cynthia Geib; Director of Administration; Philip Parr Marketing & Communications Manager; Cassandra Muhr
- Website: www.rivercitybrass.org

The River City Brass Band (River City Brass, RCB) is a modified British-style brass band based in Pittsburgh, Pennsylvania. The twenty-eight-piece ensemble performs more than thirty concerts each year as part of its community concert series in Western Pennsylvania.

It received a standing ovation from a crowd of one thousand after making its public debut at the Carnegie Music Hall in Pittsburgh's Oakland neighborhood on Saturday evening, November 21, 1981, during Pittsburgh's British Festival.

Within six years of its founding, this ensemble had "gained a national reputation as one of America's most popular touring attractions," according to the Elmira Star-Gazette, and, by the mid-1990s, was known as "one of America's premier brass ensembles."

== Ensemble history ==
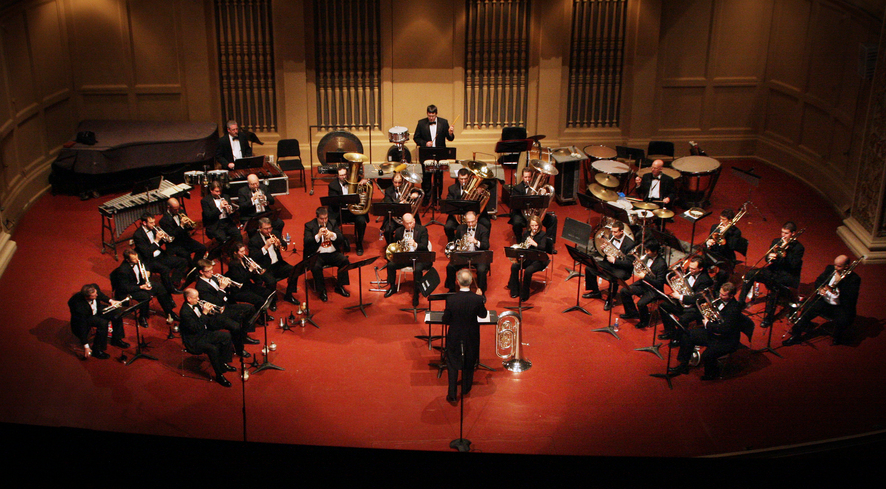
River City Brass Band

Building upon the long-standing tradition of brass bands popularized in Great Britain and the United States, the River City Brass (RCB) is staffed by twenty-five brass players and three percussionists. RCB differs from most brass bands, however, in that its instrumentation has been altered. French Horns are used instead of alto horns, and an Eb soprano trumpet is employed in place of a soprano cornet, creating a lighter, brighter, more "orchestral" sound than the traditional brass band.

On November 21, 1981, the RCB performed under the baton of conductor Robert Bernat at the Carnegie Music Hall in Pittsburgh during its inaugural concert. Among the performers during that first RCB concert were British musicians Robert Childs, a renowned euphonium performer with the Grimethorpe Colliery Band, and Arthur Taylor, a British brass band concert producer who served as the master of ceremonies for the RCB event. Enid Hattersley, then lord mayor of Sheffield, England, Pittsburgh's sister city, also participated, and was described by one area newspaper as "feisty and funny."

Since that time, the ensemble has been a featured performer at the Adelaide Festival of the Arts (Australia), Musikfest (Pennsylvania), Chautauqua Institution (New York), New Zealand International Festival of the Arts, Interlochen Center for the Arts (Michigan), and Thalian Hall (North Carolina), among many other venues across the United States and world.

According to the ensemble's website, “The mission of the River City Brass is to propagate and perpetuate musical culture, primarily American musical culture, across a broad spectrum of the public through the presentation of brass band performances, educational programs and the production of recordings. The River City Brass has as its central obligation service to the people of Western Pennsylvania.”

To that end, River City Brass members have operated a youth program since 1986. Known as the River City Youth Brass Band, it enables young musicians to hone their craft under the close supervision of professional players.

Since August 2010, the River City Brass has been led by internationally renowned tuba soloist and British conductor, James Gourlay.

== Musical directors ==
- 1981-1994 Robert Bernat
- 1994-2009 Denis Colwell
- 2010–Present James Gourlay

== Band members ==
One of the band's founding members was cornetist Joseph Murphy, a nuclear physicist at Westinghouse. A list of the principal band members of the River City Brass Band as of 2021 includes:

- Conductor: James Gourlay
- Principal Soprano Cornet: Scott Nadelson
- Principal Cornet: Josh Boudreau
- Solo Cornets: Jeffrey Nicodemus, Joseph Perrino
- Repiano Cornet: William Hughes
- 1st Cornets: Adam Leasure
- 2nd Cornets: Stephen McGough, Samantha Croach
- Principal Flugelhorn: Drew Fennell
- Horns: Jason Allison, Kenneth Russo, Brooke Boehmer
- Principal Euphonium: Algirdas Matonis
- Euphoniums: Michael Dingfelder
- Baritones: Ross Cohen, Abby Cohen
- Principal Trombone: Morgan Wynn
- Trombone: Hugh Lindsay
- Bass Trombone: Hakeem Bilal
- Principal Tuba: Sam Buccigrossi
- Eb Tuba: James Stillwagon
- Bb Tubas: Brian Kelley, Carson McTeer
- Principal Percussion: Richard Parsons
- Percussion: Paul Evans
