= Eric Ball =

Eric Ball may refer to:

- Eric Ball (American football) (born 1966), American football player
- Eric Ball (composer) (1903–1989), English composer and conductor of brass band music
