= Rodel Gonzalez =

Filipino musician and visual artist

- Born: September 10, 1959 (age 66); Manila, Philippines
- Occupations: Musician; painter; Disney Fine Art artist
- Years active: 1980s–present
- Known for: Co-founding the band Side A; Disney Fine Art artist
- Relatives: Naldy Gonzalez (brother)

Rodel Gonzalez (born September 10, 1959) is a Filipino musician and visual artist. He is a co-founder and former lead vocalist of the OPM band Side A, which he helped form in 1985, and later became a visual artist licensed to produce official Disney, Marvel, and Star Wars fine art. Philippine and regional media have described him as the first and only Filipino artist officially licensed to paint works based on those properties.

== Early life and family ==
Gonzalez comes from a family of visual artists in the Philippines. He was introduced to painting by his father, Ric (also rendered "Rick") Gonzalez, a visual artist associated with the Mabini group of painters who had apprenticed under Fernando Amorsolo before opening a gallery in California, and his grandfather Felix. Gonzalez has said he began painting at the age of nine, apprenticing at his father's gallery on Mabini Street. He was one of six brothers; he and his brother Naldy were the two who pursued careers in music, while another brother, Rudolf, became a painter associated with the Tuesday Group. According to the National Museum of the Philippines, a portrait of national hero José Rizal by Felix Gonzalez is held in the collection of the National Museum of Fine Arts in Manila.

Gonzalez studied fine arts at the University of Santo Tomas and also trained in interior design, earning a degree from the Philippine School of Interior Design. He has said his father was initially upset by his decision in the 1970s to pursue music professionally rather than painting.

== Music career ==
Gonzalez and his brother Naldy co-founded the band Side A in 1985, and Gonzalez served as one of the band's lead vocalists, also playing saxophone. The group built an early following as a resident show band at the Calesa Bar and Lounge of the Hyatt Regency hotel in Pasay City, where it performed regularly in the late 1980s. The band released its self-titled debut album in 1989 under Ivory Records and became one of the most popular acts in the Philippine music scene. Gonzalez has been credited as a songwriter on early Side A material, including "'Di Pa Huli".

Gonzalez left Side A around 1990 to form the band Second Wind. He stepped away from the local music scene in 2002. He has since reunited with Side A's original members for later performances, including online benefit concerts in 2021 and a 2024 Valentine's concert in Manila.

== Visual art career ==
After leaving the music scene, Gonzalez moved to Hawaii in 2002 and resumed painting, initially exhibiting through galleries there. He later relocated to Los Angeles to expand his exhibition opportunities.

In 2008, Disney Fine Art chief executive Michael Young invited Gonzalez to join the roster of Collectors Editions, the official licensee of The Walt Disney Company that publishes Disney Fine Art; Philippine media have described him as the only Filipino artist on that roster. When Disney acquired Lucasfilm, Gonzalez was among a small number of Disney Fine Art artists granted licenses to create Star Wars work, which he attributed to his background in realist seascape and landscape painting. He was signed by Acme Archives Direct, a Lucasfilm licensee, to create officially licensed Star Wars art; he has said that filmmaker George Lucas purchased four of his first five pieces. He describes his licensed work as "interpretative art," depicting recognizable film scenes from original vantage points rather than reproducing existing imagery. His portfolio later expanded to include Marvel characters.

Gonzalez has exhibited his work in the Philippines and the United States. His Star Wars pieces have been shown at venues including Bonifacio Global City in 2015. He staged a one-man show, "The Fine Art of Rodel Gonzalez," at the Sheraton Manila Hotel in June 2023, and presented work at the Manila Art Show in 2023 and 2024, the latter themed around the Year of the Dragon. Works from the 2024 exhibition, including "Azure Dragon," "El Nido Paradise," and "Osaka Lady," were reported to be priced at over ₱1 million each. A practitioner of the dry-brush technique, Gonzalez works primarily in oil and acrylic and is based in Florida.
