= Frank Renton =

British musician, conductor and broadcaster

Frank Renton is a British musician, conductor and broadcaster, and former host of Listen to the Band on BBC Radio 2.

An accomplished trumpet player, Renton won a competition for young conductors at the 1967 Edinburgh Festival, whilst employed as a musician in the British Army. Conducting appointments soon followed in West Germany, Cyprus, Singapore and Scotland, before returning to England as Director of a Military Music School in York. He was Musical Director for James Shepherd Versatile Brass for three years, and began conducting the Grimethorpe Colliery Band. He has also worked extensively with the BBC Concert Orchestra and BBC Radio Orchestra, as well as writing and producing a number of musical programmes for BBC Radio.

In 1985, Renton was appointed Principal Conductor of the Royal Artillery Orchestra in London, then in 1988 accepted the dual appointment of Principal Director of Music for the Army and Director of the Royal Military School of Music at Kneller Hall in the rank of Lt. Colonel, the youngest person ever to hold the dual appointments. In 1988, he also became Principal Conductor of the British Concert Orchestra, and began to guest conduct all over the world. Through the series of Royal Concerts in London he conducted the London Philharmonic Orchestra, the Halle Orchestra, the Orchestra of English National Opera and the Scottish National orchestra, and was awarded the Freedom of the City of London in 1986. He is also a member of the Worshipful Company of Musicians.

In 1993, as a direct result of the celebration of the Centenary of the Leeds City Charter, and after a concert in Leeds Town Hall, in which some 250 local wind players took part, Frank Renton co-founded, and initially conducted, the Yorkshire Wind Orchestra. This large wind ensemble of woodwind, brass and percussionists, is a community based ensemble.

In 2009 and 2010, with the 'Brass Band du Nord Pas-de-Calais', he won the French Brass Band Championship.
