= National Museum of Taiwan Literature mascot plagiarism controversy =

2023–2024 controversy

From 2023 to 2024, the National Museum of Taiwan Literature (NMTL) was involved in a plagiarism controversy involving its mascot.

== Incident ==
In mid-December 2023, the NMTL introduced a chibi-style dragon mascot named "A-Long" to celebrate the Year of the Dragon and promote its "Journey to the Stars: Exploring the Literary Star Map" interactive puzzle game. The design was soon accused of plagiarizing "AoWu Dragon Baby", an original character created in 2022 by Chinese illustrator Tongnian Nora. In response, the museum stated that "A-Long" had been commissioned from a Taiwanese illustrator and had actually been created in 2019. It provided screenshots from Instagram as evidence and instead accused Nora of plagiarism. Major Taiwanese news outlets largely supported the museum's position at the time.

On 11 May 2024, the creator of "AoWu Dragon Baby", using the account "嗷呜龙宝_AoWu" on Weibo, presented additional evidence, including concept sketches, drafts, videos, and layered files dating from 2022. The creator also questioned the authenticity of the museum's Instagram screenshots, pointing out numerous inconsistencies and noting that the Instagram account shown in the screenshots could not be found.

On 14 May, the artist, using the online name Nora Qu, posted a detailed account of the controversy to the Taiwanese Facebook group "Empty Can Sketch Club", providing creative records and files while highlighting flaws in the museum's Instagram evidence. Nora stated that if the museum could provide conclusive proof that she had committed plagiarism, she would permanently abandon drawing and leave the illustration community.

On 15 May, the museum announced that, after comparing relevant materials provided by its contractor, it had concluded that no plagiarism had occurred and declined to comment on the Chinese illustrator's claims. Late that night, Huang Sheng-hung, founder of the museum's contractor Bon World Digital Creative, posted on his personal Facebook page claiming to possess evidence proving that the design had originally been created in 2019. He denounced online accusations of plagiarism as politically motivated attacks and stated that he was trying to protect a colleague in their twenties who had only recently graduated. Huang further described the works of Bon World Digital Creative and "AoWu Dragon Baby" as examples of "parallel creation". The post was later deleted.

On 16 May, the NMTL issued an apology on Facebook, acknowledging that the images related to "A-Long" were not original creations of Bon World Digital Creative and admitting that the Instagram screenshots provided as evidence had been fabricated.

On 17 May, the museum told reporters from the Central News Agency that, although it considered itself the biggest victim in the controversy, it nevertheless needed to review and improve its own administrative procedures. Museum officials admitted that they had placed excessive trust in materials supplied by the contractor and had been unable to verify their authenticity using relevant information technology in a short period of time. The museum stated that it would clarify administrative responsibility and impose disciplinary measures where appropriate.

On the same day, the original creator issued a statement on the Facebook fan page "嗷呜龙宝_AoWu", thanking supporters, friends, and internet users, and announcing that the matter would be resolved through legal channels with the assistance of an international law firm.

On 18 May, the museum issued another formal apology and recalled the infringing merchandise.

In August 2025, Tongnian Nora filed a lawsuit against Bon World Digital Creative. The case was initially dismissed through a non-prosecution decision, but the Intellectual Property Unit of the Taiwan High Prosecutors Office ordered further investigation.
