= James Gourlay =

Scottish conductor and tubist

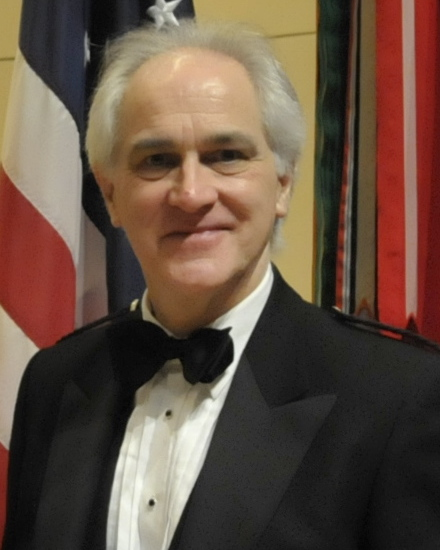
James Gourlay in 2013

James Gourlay (born 1956) is a Scottish conductor and tubist.

== Biography ==
Gourlay was born in Scotland and began to play in his local brass band at an early age. He took part in numerous solo competitions at that time and soon became Scottish Champion at junior and open levels. After studying at the Royal College of Music Gourlay became principal tuba of the City of Birmingham Symphony Orchestra where he remained for four years. There followed posts in the BBC Symphony Orchestra and the Orchester der Oper in Zürich where he worked with most of the world's top conductors. In 2010 he became the musical director of the River City Brass Band located in Pittsburgh, Pennsylvania.

As a soloist and chamber musician, James Gourlay has won international acclaim. He is a former member of the Philip Jones Brass Ensemble and has toured the World performing concertos with major orchestras and giving countless recitals. He has also broadcast Harrison Birtwistle's The Cry of Anubis with the BBC Philharmonic and has recorded a number of solo CD recordings, which cover all of the major works for tuba. Gourlay is a featured artist for both the Doyen and Polyphonic labels for whom he has recorded as a soloist and as a conductor of wind and brass bands. He has also recorded the Gregson and Vaughan Williams concertos for the Naxos label.

Gourlay has a commitment to new music and has given premières of works by Bingham, Gorb, Gilbert, Lachenmann, Gregson, Horovitz, Sparke, Penderecki and Newton to name but a few.

Gourlay has appeared as a guest conductor with both wind and brass ensembles in Europe and Brazil. He is the principal guest conductor of the National Youth Wind Orchestra Great Britain, having toured with them to Paris, Prague and Ireland, and has conducted all the UK's top Brass Bands. He has made a number of recordings with the RNCM Wind Orchestra and was the musical director of Grimethorpe Colliery Band.

Gourlay has guest-teaching engagements in Lyon, Weimar, the Eastman School of Music, the Juilliard School and the Hong Kong Academy for Performing Arts. He was Head of Wind and Percussion at the Royal Northern College of Music, where he was awarded an honorary Fellowship, before returning to his Scottish roots and taking the appointment of director of the School of Music at the Royal Scottish Academy of Music and Drama. Now pursuing his a career as a soloist, conductor and pedagogue, James Gourlay is in wide demand internationally. He holds a master's degree, with distinction, from the University of Leeds and Doctor of Music Arts Degree from the University of Salford.

On 9 and 10 April 2007, Gourlay performed Bruce Fraser's "Tuba Concerto" at Birmingham Town Hall and the Cadogan Hall respectively, with the National Youth Wind Orchestra of Great Britain.
