= EverReady Band =

Brass band in the northeast of England

- Brass Band
- Former name: Berec (Ever Ready), Craghead Colliery (-1969), Ever Ready (Craghead Colliery) (-1969), Ever Ready (G.B.), Ever Ready Band, Ever Ready Co (GB), Reg Vardy (Ever Ready), Reg Vardy Band
- Founded: 1910 (116 years ago)
- Location: Stanley, County Durham, England
- Principal conductor: Russell Gray
- Music director: Chris Shanks
- Website: everreadyband.co.uk

The EverReady Band is a brass band based in North East England. Since 1958 the band has been nationally graded as a Championship Section band and has won the North of England Brass Band Championships 36 times since that time. Following the end of the band's sponsorship deal with Reg Vardy in 2023 the band reverted to its previous name EverReady Band.

== Craghead Colliery Band ==
The band was formed in 1910 as the Craghead Colliery Band. The band provided recreational activity for the miners in the village of Craghead, County Durham. In the early 1950s, Eric Cunningham became resident conductor of the band. Cunningham's first appointment was as Bandmaster of the Craghead Colliery Band at the age of 29. The band qualified for the 1953 second section finals in London. The steady progress continued seeing the band compete at London in five second section finals in six years. 1958 saw the band promoted to the Championship Section and after a settling in period the band qualified for the National Finals for the first time in 1963.

1968 saw Craghead Colliery to be one of the first north east coal mines to close. Much of the workforce found employment at the newly opened Ever Ready Batteries and Electronics factory in the nearby village of Tanfield Lea.

== Ever Ready Band ==
By the end of 1968, Ever Ready had taken over sponsorship of the band and given the band a new home. The band became known as The Ever Ready Band . Between 1972 and 1982 the band won eleven consecutive regional championships, which included five hat tricks. Other highlights also included winning the title of BBC Band of the Year in 1974 and gaining 4th prize at The British Open in 1987. At this time, The Ever Ready Band totally dominated North East brass band competitions and the band became well known for their high standards of musicianship. The now famous scarlet tunics were seen at major concert venues throughout the United Kingdom. The Ever Ready factory closed in 1992 and the Band became entirely self-supporting, whilst retaining the famous Ever Ready name in token only. The high standards of musicianship were maintained despite a lack of sponsorship which placed a financial burden on both the players and officials. The Band did find a new permanent home not far from its original roots of Craghead Village, in the centre of Stanley, County Durham, where through fundraising and financial help from the players, the band was able to purchase an old Salvation Army Hall.

== Reg Vardy Band ==
During March 2003, the band signed a sponsorship deal with the then motor retailer, The Reg Vardy Group. This helped to ensure the financial security of the band. After 36 years, the band changed their name to The Reg Vardy Band. The partnership with Reg Vardy has helped the band through another period of success where they achieved seven Northern Area titles, third place, two fourth placings, fifth and a sixth-place finish at Brass In Concert, a third place and a sixth place at The International Masters and three consecutive top ten finishes at the British Open. The band's greatest achievement so far was gaining third prize at the National Finals at the Royal Albert Hall in October 2004. This led to the band being invited to represent England in the 2005 World Championships held in Kerkrade, the Netherlands where the band claimed fifth prize.

In January 2006, The Reg Vardy Group was sold to Pendragon. Sir Peter Vardy has always taken an interest in the band's progress and development and maintained links with the management committee. Because of this, the band's sponsorship continues through The Vardy Foundation with the band maintaining the name of Sir Peter's father, Reg Vardy who was a supporter of the Ever Ready Band some years ago. The links with Sir Peter allowed the band to become involved with the Emmanuel Schools Foundation where the band regularly performs concerts at the four schools in Gateshead, Blyth, Middlesbrough and Thorne near Doncaster. The band also provides master classes with young brass players from the schools helping them to develop into brass players of the future. This is a project the band hopes to nurture over the coming years.

The band appears in major concert venues throughout the UK and have recorded 4 major CDs including 'Cool'.

The Reg Vardy Band has formed a partnership with renowned conductor Ray Farr who is Conductor in Residence at Durham University. This partnership has seen the band become Durham University's Brass Band in residence. With this involvement, the band has performed at many pioneering concerts with famous names such as Elgar Howarth, Roy Newsome and Dr John Pickard. The Band also supports Ray with conducting master classes.
