= Buy As You View =

British retail and finance company

- Trade name: Buy As You View
- Formerly: Just Rentals (1972–1998)
- Company type: Subsidiary
- Industry: Retail and finance
- Predecessor: Just Rentals (1972–1998)
- Founded: 1972 (as Just Rentals); 1998 (as Buy As You View)
- Defunct: 2019 (administration)
- Fate: Administration (2017, 2019)
- Headquarters: Bridgend, Wales
- Area served: United Kingdom
- Key people: EY (Administrator)
- Products: see full list
- Brands: BAYV
- Services: Weekly Payments
- Revenue: ▼ (2019)
- Net income: ▼ (unknown)
- Total assets: ▲
- Owner: BAYV Investments Limited
- Parent: Buy As You View Holdings Ltd
- Website: www.bayv.co.uk
- Footnotes / references administration

Buy As You View (BAYV) was a retail and consumer finance company, selling a range of electrical goods and home furniture. It provided a coin meter repayment and credit facility for products bought on a hire purchase, weekly payment basis with no deposit or credit checks. Hire purchase contracts are regulated by the Consumer Credit Act 1974.

== History ==
Buy As You View is the trading name for Buy As You View Holdings and Dunraven Finance Limited. Both are subsidiaries of BAYV Investments Limited.

Established in South Wales in 1972, initially as "Just Rentals", Buy As You View (since 1998), and still based in Bridgend, it operated in the North East, Yorkshire, the Midlands, the North West and Scotland and employed 700 staff nationally.

Repayments were originally made via a coin box in the customer's house, which representatives would call at to empty regularly. Later, repayments would be made online, via direct debit, or in cash. In each case, a payment meter connected to the customer's television set would deactivate the TV should payments be in default — regardless of whether the customer had financed the television with the company.

In 2016 Buy as You View compensated 59,000 customers a total of £939,000 for fees charged from 2001 onwards after the Financial Conduct Authority raised concerns about the company's treatment of customers in arrears, in particular the transparency of their fees and the practice of using payment meters to restrict customers' access to TVs.

In September 2017 the company was placed into administration after incurring what administrators EY described as "significant losses". On 3 June 2019 the company ceased to collect any further payments from customers, who were allowed to keep any items they had purchased.

== Products ==
Buy As You View (BAYV) specialised in television, washing machine, mobile phone, computer (laptop, PC, Wii and PlayStation), washer, dryer, fridge freezer, dishwasher, vacuum cleaner and cooker rentals. In addition to renting household electrical items, BAYV also offered a wide range of pay weekly household furniture items, including sofas, beds, pushchairs, bikes and dining room furniture. This approach to buy now pay later purchasing enabled Buy As You View customers to pay weekly for their household electrical and furniture items via a coin meter TV (in addition to Direct Debit and cash payments).

== Charity, community projects and partnerships ==
Buy As You View were involved in supporting a number of community initiatives and local charities. These include supporting cancer charities such as the Joshua Foundation and Macmillan Cancer Support. BAYV have also helped local sports teams to purchase equipment such as football kits and rugby kits, as well as giving talks to youngsters in local schools in and around the communities in which they operate.

In addition to their recent community initiatives, Buy As You View were known in and around the South Wales area for their long-term sponsorship of the Cory Band which began in 1998. In 2004, Cory was removed from the band's name in appreciation of the continued support from Buy As You View and for some time, the band was simply known as the Buy As You View band.

BAYV worked in partnership with the Consumer Credit Trade Association and the Credit Services Association to ensure that they kept up to date and complied with credit legislation in the UK and Europe.
