= Eric Ball (composer) =

British composer, arranger and conductor (1903–1989)

Eric Walter John Ball OBE (31 October 1903 – 1 October 1989) was a British composer, arranger and conductor of brass band music, described as "one of the most prolific writers and influential figures in the brass band and choral world".

== Biography ==
He was born in Kingswood, South Gloucestershire, the eldest of 16 children whose parents were active in the Salvation Army. When he was a child, the family moved to Surrey, Kent, and London. He learned piano and organ and in 1919 started work in the Salvation Army musical instrument department in central London, soon moving to the Musical Editorial Department as a composer. He became an officer in the Salvation Army, and in 1928 re-established the Salvationist Publishing and Supplies (S. P. & S.) Band. The 18-member band, led by Ball, was used extensively at Salvation Army meetings, and recorded. In 1935 Ball also became the conductor of the Salvation Army's National Orchestra, also conducted and accompanied the Salvation Singers and trained band members. In 1942 he became bandmaster of the International Staff Band (I.S.B.), the premier Salvation Army band, with the rank of major.

Ball resigned unexpectedly from the Salvation Army in 1944, after he started attending spiritualist meetings following the death of his sister-in-law. He soon became involved in judging brass band competitions, and in 1945 became conductor of the Brighouse and Rastrick Brass Band, winning the national championships with them the following year. He also became editor of The British Bandsman magazine. In 1948, as conductor of the CWS (Manchester) Band, he won the British Open brass band championship and he also performed with other bands including the Ransome & Marles band and the City of Coventry Band.

By the mid-1950s, he withdrew from conducting brass bands competitively, to concentrate on teaching and composing music. He became active in teaching brass band courses in Cornwall, and wrote many test pieces for bands, including "Resurgam" (1950), "Tournament for Brass" (1954), "Main Street" (1961), "Journey Into Freedom" (1967), and "The Wayfarer" (1976). He also wrote cantatas for chorus and band.

Ball was awarded the OBE in 1969.

In 1972, Ball assembled the Virtuosi Brass Band of Great Britain, a recording ensemble of top players, including James Shepherd who occupied the principal cornet seat and helped Ball assemble the rest of the band. The ensemble which would go on to record nine LPs for RCA Records, with Ball serving as musical director for the first four.

He died in Bournemouth in 1989, aged 85.

== Selected compositions ==
- The Triumph of Peace
- The Kingdom Triumphant
- The Eternal Presence
- Journey Into Freedom
- The King of Kings
- The Old Wells
- Resurgam
- Song of Welcome
- Songs in Exile
- Star Lake
- Torch of Freedom
- Tournament for Brass
- Morning Rhapsody
- Sunset Rhapsody
- Festival Music
- Indian Summer
- Song of Courage
- Glory to His Name
- The Prospect Before Us
- Main Street

== National Brass Band Championships of Great Britain ==
A number of Ball's pieces have been selected as test pieces for the National Brass Band Championships of Great Britain, both at the area contests and the national finals.

Year	Piece	Section	Contest
1946	Thanksgiving	3rd	Area
1947	Akhnaton	Ch	Area
1947	Divertimento	4th	Area
1947	Divertimento	4th	Final
1948	Four Preludes	2nd	Area
1948	Three Songs without Words	4th	Area
1948	Four Preludes	2nd	Final
1948	Three Songs without Words	4th	Final
1949	Morning Rhapsody	Ch	Area
1949	Petite Suite de Ballet	3rd	Area
1949	Petite Suite de Ballet	3rd	Final
1950	Indian Summer	3rd	Area
1950	Indian Summer	3rd	Final
1951	The English Maiden	2nd	Area
1951	The English Maiden	2nd	Final
1952	Resurgam	Ch	Area
1953	A Holiday Suite	3rd	Area
1953	A Holiday Suite	3rd	Final
1954	Call of the Sea	2nd	Area
1954	Call of the Sea	2nd	Final
1956	Festival Music	Ch	Final
1956	Three Songs without Words	4th	Final
1957	Four Preludes	2nd	Final
1958	Devon Fantasy	3rd	Area
1960	The Princess and the Poet	4th	Area
1960	Call of the Sea	3rd	Final
1962	Contest Day	4th	Area
1962	Four Preludes	3rd	Final
1963	Everybody's Child	4th	Final
1964	Oasis	2nd	Final
1964	The English Maiden	3rd	Final
1966	The English Maiden	3rd	Area
1966	Everybody's Child	4th	Area
1967	Festival Music	Ch	Area
1967	Journey into Freedom	Ch	Final
1968	Fowey River Suite	3rd	Area
1968	Third Rhapsody on Negro Spirituals	2nd	Final
1968	Homeward	4th	Final
1969	Petite Suite de Ballet	4th	Area
1969	High Peak	Ch	Final
1969	American Sketches	4th	Final
1970	A Psalm for All Nations	4th	Final
1971	The Ancient Temple	4th	Area
1971	Celebration	2nd	Final
1972	A Kensington Concerto	Ch	Final
1973	St. Michael's Mount	4th	Area
1974	Devon Fantasy	3rd	Area
1974	Youth Salutes a Master	4th	Final
1975	Journey into Freedom	Ch	Area
1976	Tournament for Brass	2nd	Area
1976	Sinfonietta for Brass Band – The Wayfarer	Ch	Final
1976	Third Rhapsody on Negro Spirituals	3rd	Final
1977	Morning Rhapsody	2nd	Area
1978	Call of the Sea	3rd	Area
1980	Main Street	3rd	Area
1981	Contest Day	4th	Final
1984	Divertimento	4th	Area
1985	Celebration	2nd	Final
1987	Scottish Festival Overture	3rd	Area
1988	Sunrise	2nd	Final
1991	Journey into Freedom	Ch	Area
1992	Celebration	1st	Area
1992	Holiday Overture for Brass	2nd	Final
1993	Impromptu	4th	Area
1993	Journey into Freedom	1st	Final
1994	St. Michael's Mount	4th	Final
1999	Main Street	3rd	Area
1999	Indian Summer	4th	Area
2001	The Undaunted	1st	Area
2003	A Kensington Concerto	1st	Final
2003	Sunset Rhapsody	2nd	Final
2003	Four Preludes	3rd	Final
2003	Call of the Sea	4th	Final
2007	Sinfonietta for Brass Band – The Wayfarer	1st	Area
2008	Festival Music	Ch	Area
2011	Resurgam	2nd	Area
2013	Devon Fantasy	4th	Area
2017	Tournament for Brass	1st	Final
2017	Petite Suite de Ballet	4th	Final
2024	High Peak	1st	Area
2026	Song of Courage	2nd	Final

Several of his arrangements have also been used.

Year	Piece	Original Composer	Section	Contest
1946	Eine kleine Nachtmusik	Wolfgang Amadeus Mozart	2nd	Area
1957	Themes from Symphony No. 9	Ludwig van Beethoven	Ch	Area
1960	Themes from Symphony No. 5	Ludwig van Beethoven	Ch	Area
1964	A Rural Suite	Charles Woodhouse	4th	Area
1965	Themes from Symphony No. 1	Ludwig van Beethoven	Ch	Area
1967	Eine kleine Nachtmusik	Wolfgang Amadeus Mozart	3rd	Area
1970	Themes from Symphony No. 9	Ludwig van Beethoven	2nd	Final
1971	Suite Gothique	Léon Boëllmann	2nd	Area
1978	Four Dances from Checkmate	Arthur Bliss	Ch	Final
1981	Froissart Overture	Edward Elgar	2nd	Final
1983	A French Suite	Alexandre Boëly	3rd	Final
1995	Suite Gothique	Léon Boëllmann	3rd	Final
2003	Theme and Eight Variations from Enigma	Edward Elgar	Ch	Final

In addition, several pieces were used as the youth section area contest test piece: The Young in Heart in 1965, Petite Suite de Ballet in 1975, and Rhapsody on Negro Spirituals in 1983.
