= David Thornton (musician) =

British brass band musician (born 1978)

- Born: 1978 (age 47–48); Nottingham, UK
- Origin: Nottingham
- Occupations: Band musician, solo musician, teacher, clinician, Conductor
- Instrument: Euphonium
- Website: www.davethornton.co.uk

David Thornton (born 1978) is a British solo euphonium player for the Brighouse and Rastrick Brass Band.

== Biography ==
Thornton began learning the euphonium at the age of eight and was soon after accepted as the first ever euphonium student at Chetham's School of Music in Manchester, England. During this time he held the principal euphonium position of the National Youth Brass Band of Great Britain. David went on to the Royal Northern College of Music, where he studied with Steven Mead, graduating in 2000. In July 2000 he was appointed as principal euphonium of the Black Dyke Band.

He left the band at the end of 2010.

Thornton has earned several awards including scholarships from the Countess of Munster Trust and the Yamaha Music Foundation of Europe, the National Euphonium Conference Solo Prize 1995, 1997 and 1999, first prize at the Verso Il Millenio International Euphonium Competition, and the International Euphonium Player of the Year 2001.

He has been featured on BBC Television, BBC Radio and Classic FM. David has performed as a guest player with the BBC Philharmonic Orchestra, Birmingham's Royal Ballet, and Remix-Ensemble (Portugal's premier contemporary group).

Thornton teaches at the Royal Northern College of Music, the University of Huddersfield, the University of Leeds, the University of Manchester and Chetham's School of Music. He became Associate Conductor of the Longridge band, based near Preston, Lancashire, in 2003.

== Discography ==
=== Solo albums ===
- 2004: Three Worlds
- 2007: Devil's Duel

=== Featured as soloist ===
- 2001: Essential Dyke III
- 2001: Epic Brass
- 2002: Black Dyke Plays Verdi
- 2002: Call of the Cossacks
- 2003: Spectacular Classics Vol. 3
- 2004: Essential Dyke IV
- 2004: Trumpets of the Angels
- 2004: Kapitol Brass – Highlights of the 2004 National Finals
- 2004: Spectacular Classics Vol. 4
- 2005: Essential Dyke V
- 2005: Spectacular Classics Vol. 5
- 2006: The Black Dyke Christmas Carol
- Jubilee Brass
- Portrait of Peter Graham

=== DVD appearance as soloist ===
- 2001: Epic Brass
