= Day of the Dragon =

Day of the Dragon or Dragon Day may refer to:

- Dragon Day, annual event
- Dragon Day (novel), 2005 novel
- The Day of the Dragon, an episode of Ninjago: Masters of Spinjitzu
- Warcraft: Day of the Dragon, 2001 novel
- "The Day of the Dragon", a 1934 story by Guy Endore

== See also ==
- Year of the Dragon (disambiguation)
