= Roger Webster =

- Born: Roger Barry Webster; 16 December 1960 (age 65); Doncaster, England
- Genres: Brass Band, classical
- Occupations: Composer, pedagogue, trumpeter, cornetist, psychologist
- Instruments: Cornet trumpet flugelhorn
- Years active: 1988–present
- Labels: Doyen, Polyphonic, World of Brass
- Formerly of: Grimethorpe Colliery Band
- Website: rogerwebster.co.uk

Roger Webster (born 1960) is an English cornetist and psychologist. He has been acclaimed as one of the world's best ever cornetists. He also teaches performance at the Royal Northern College of Music as well as giving lectures on psychology (specialising in Cognitive Intervention Therapy a version of CBT). Webster has played with some of the world's best brass bands.

== Biography ==
Webster was born in 1960 in Doncaster, England. He was raised in Brierley. His first instrument was piano which he started playing at the age of 6. Four years later he began playing his current instrument the cornet. The piano was gradually pushed aside as he progressed with the cornet at Grimethorpe Colliery Junior Band. Before becoming a professional musician, he worked down the coal mines and prior to that as a laboratory technician. However, it wasn't until 1988 that he began to turn his hobby into his profession. In this year he was invited to join Black Dyke, one of the world's greatest brass bands, as principal cornet. He stayed here for 5 years before deciding to pursue a solo career. He did however contest during his solo period with CWS (Glasgow) Band, arguably the top band in Scotland. Webster continued to play on occasions with the BBC Philharmonic Orchestra. In 2000 he was once again invited to join Black Dyke Band, and accepted saying it felt as though he had "seven years off for personal development". It was during this time that he received a master's degree in music at the University of Leeds, and went on to complete his PhD in psychology The stay once again lasted five years with him leaving in December 2005. Within days he joined Grimethorpe Colliery Band after the band manager, invited him to join, as the principal cornet had left only as few days previously. In his first contest for Grimethorpe they came first beating his former band by one point whilst also picking up the best soloist award Roger left Grimethorpe in December 2008 along with several colleagues and is currently busy performing as a soloist and orchestral trumpeter (receiving great critical acclaim for his flugal playing in Mahler 3 and trumpet work in Gregson's Dream Song.). Webster worked for Besson whilst they were situated near London, and continues to work for them following their take-over by Buffet Crampon. Roger rejoined Grimethorpe in 2015 on principal cornet in a bid to help Grimethorpe become as successful as their recent history, when Webster was last in the band Roger has recently been awarded a professorship at the RNCM. In 2012 Webster released his first solo CD in eight years, however, this CD was for the charity Help For Heroes, and he was accompanied by The Guards' Brass Band .

== Queen Victoria cornet ==
Webster owns a very old Besson cornet, one that was originally presented to Alexander Owen in 1875 by Queen Victoria. It is specially engraved, and has the Royal crest on the bell. The reason why the Queen presented such a gift is unknown; however, it was presented during the time when Brass music was the pop music of the day. Alexander's daughter gave it to a friend who in turn presented it to Derek Garside after a charity concert in 1961. Roger received the cornet from Garside in 2002, after Garside decided it was time to pass it on to "the present day cornet king". Webster still has it to this day.

== Discography ==
Webster has appeared as soloist on well over 20 CDs, excluding his own.
His personal solo CDs are:

Date of Release	Title	Label
1994	Twilight Dreams	Polyphonic
1995	Pieces	Polyphonic
1997	Bandsman's Choice	Polyphonic
1999	Webster's Choice	Polyphonic
2004	Passport – A Musical Journey	Doyen
2012	My Heroes	Polyphonic

== Bibliography ==
Date of Release	Title	Publishers
2005	Preparation, Practice & Performance	Fentone Music
2005	Classical Favourites for Trumpet	Fentone Music
2006	Trumpet Through the Ages	Fentone Music
2006	Preparation, Practice & Performance (German Edition)	Fentone Music

- On Classical Favourites for Trumpet Webster arranged all the pieces.
- On Trumpet Through the Ages he performs on the backing CD
