= The Year of the Dragon (music) =

1984 brass band piece by Philip Sparke

- by Philip Sparke
- Catalogue: EAN 9790050019947
- Form: Brass band; Wind band
- Occasion: Centenary Celebration
- Commissioned by: Cory Band
- Duration: 13:00
- Movements: 3

Premiere
- Date: March 1984
- Location: St David's Hall
- Conductor: Major Arthur Kenney
- Performers: Cory Band

The Year of the Dragon is a musical composition by Philip Sparke originally written for the internationally acclaimed and awarded Cory Band's Centenary Celebrations held at St. David's Hall in Cardiff in March 1984. The composition has since made a regular appearance worldwide as a test piece for brass band competitions.

== Background ==
The Cory Band, with the aid of funds provided by the Welsh Arts Council, had commissioned Philip Sparke to write a work for their centenary concert in celebration of being the first Welsh band to win the European Brass Band Champions in 1980. The title The Year of the Dragon is in reference to the red dragon as the national emblem for Wales.

At the time I wrote The Year of the Dragon, Cory had won two successive National Finals and I set out to write a virtuoso piece to display the talents of this remarkable band to the full.

— Philip Sparke, Composer's Notes

Philip Sarke transcribed The Year of the Dragon for wind band a year after its premiere in 1985., which he later revised as a new 2017 wind band edition commissioned by the Siena Wind Orchestra he himself premiered on June 17, 2017, at Bunkyo Civic Hall, Tokyo with the orchestra.

There are many rhythms and chord progressions throughout the piece that would suggest a slight jazz influence, mostly in the style of George Gershwin.

== Structure ==
The Year of the Dragon is written in three movements:

1. Toccata
2. Interlude
3. Finale

Approximate performance time is thirteen minutes 13'00".

=== I. Toccata ===
Molto allegro, con malizia ( = 168)

The first movement starts with a group of sudden solo rapid snare drum single–stroke roll, which Sparke asks to be played as loud as possible at the start and should drive forward with accents firmly made. It is then followed by a low, ominous motif.

This is repeated until the rest of the winds join in, introducing the first melodic theme of the movement. This is intermitted by a central dance-like section that soon gives way back to the return of the first theme where the rest of the band then re-enters the fray, eventually leading into a brief chorale section before going back into the dance. This continues until the movement fades out with the final faint echoes of the opening melody.

=== II. Interlude ===
con moto ( = 72)

This movement is largely a sorrowful, delicate trombone solo. A slightly more joyful chorale offers a brief exit from the melancholic setting, before the solo returns to bring the movement to a hushed close. This solo is often played in a rubato form, allowing the soloist to slow down or speed up for virtuosic effect.

=== III. Finale ===
Molto vivace ( = 138)

The final movement of this piece begins with a fast feature with occasional outbursts in the background. Following this is a march-like section with playful strains planted throughout. The main theme is then reiterated with more triumphal sounding excerpts played by the horns. The bells are given a fanfare to play as the winds crescendo to a final climax and ending the piece with a fast-paced, rousing conclusion.

== Instrumentation ==
=== Brass Band ===
- E♭ Soprano cornet
- 9 B♭ Cornets
- B♭ Flugelhorn
- 3 E♭ horns
- 2 B♭ baritones
- 2 B♭ Trombones
- Bass trombone
- 2 B♭ Euphoniums
- 2 E♭ Basses
- 2 B♭ Basses
- 3 Percussion (snare drum, bass drum, timpani, xylophone, glockenspiel, cymbal, tambourine, triangle, tam-tam)

=== Concert Band (Original 1985 Edition) ===
- Piccolo
- Flute I, II
- Oboe I, II
- E♭ Clarinet
- B♭ Clarinet I, II, III
- E♭ Alto Clarinet
- B♭ Bass Clarinet
- Bassoon I, II
- E♭ Alto Saxophone I, II
- B♭ Tenor Saxophone
- E♭ Baritone Saxophone
- B♭ Cornet I, II, III
- B♭ Trumpet I, II
- F Horn I, II, III, IV
- Trombone I, II, III
- Euphonium
- Tuba
- Percussion (snare drum, bass drum, timpani, xylophone, glockenspiel, cymbal, tambourine, triangle, tam-tam)

=== Concert Band (2017 Edition) ===
- Piccolo
- Flute I, II
- Oboe I, II
- English Horn
- Bassoon I, II
- Double Bassoon
- E♭ Clarinet
- B♭ Clarinet I, II, III
- E♭ Alto Clarinet
- B♭ Bass Clarinet
- B♭ Contrabass Clarinet
- B♭ Soprano Saxophone
- E♭ Alto Saxophone I, II
- B♭ Tenor Saxophone
- E♭ Baritone Saxophone
- B♭ Cornet I, II, III
- B♭ Trumpet I, II
- F Horn I, II, III, IV
- Trombone I, II, III
- Euphonium
- Tuba
- Double Bass
- Timpani
- Percussion (Snare Drum, Bass Drum, Tubular Bells, Crash Cymbals, Suspended Cymbal, Bells, Xylophone, Tambourine, Tam-Tam, Triangle, Wood Block)
