= James Shepherd (musician) =

English cornet player (1936–2023)

- Also known as: Jim Shepherd
- Born: 25 November 1936
- Died: 22 June 2023 (aged 86)
- Occupation(s): Musician, band leader, conductor
- Instrument: Cornet
- Formerly of: Newbiggin Colliery Band; Carlton Main Frickley Colliery Band; Black Dyke Band; James Shepherd Versatile Brass; Virtuosi Brass Band of Great Britain

James Shepherd (25 November 1936 – 22 June 2023) was an English cornet player from Northumberland, described as one of the world's most respected players of the instrument, having won the Championship Soloist of Great Britain Prize in three consecutive years (1962-4). He was principal cornet of Carlton Main Frickley Colliery Band from 1960 to 1963, then the Black Dyke Band from 1963 to 1973, before forming a brass ensemble, James Shepherd Versatile Brass, which he led until 1989. He was also principal cornet of the Virtuosi Brass Band, a recording ensemble assembled by Eric Ball.

== Biography ==
=== Early life ===
He was born on 25 November 1936 in Newbiggin-by-the-Sea, Northumberland, the son of James, a coal miner and cornet player, and Elizabeth, née Wood. He began playing at around age 8 and initially learned from his father, and then with George Wright, the conductor at Newbiggin Colliery Band.

He left school at 15 to work at the local Co-op store, then did national service in the Royal Army Medical Corps, where he also developed his musical skills. On his return to Northumberland, he joined the Pegswood Colliery brass band.

=== Carlton Main and Black Dyke ===
In 1960, he joined Carlton Main Frickley Colliery Band as principal cornet. In 1962, he won the Championship Soloist of Great Britain prize, and in June was announced as principal cornet in the Black Dyke Band, replacing Maurice Murphy. Shortly afterwards he changed his mind, opting to remain at Carlton Main.

However, in 1963, he reversed his decision and moved to take up the Black Dyke principal cornet seat. He went on to win the Championship Soloist of Great Britain prize again in both 1963 and 1964, a unique hat-trick achievement. During his time as principal cornet, Black Dyke won the British National Championships in 1967 and 1972, the British Open in 1968 and 1972 and the World Championship in 1970 and were BBC Band of the Year in 1967 and 1970. The band also recorded extensively during this time, frequently featuring Shepherd as soloist. In 1971 he was awarded the Insignia of Honour at the National Brass Band Championships of Great Britain, recognising "conspicuous service to brass bands".

His time with Black Dyke also gave Shepherd the opportunity to play in smaller brass ensembles, including a quartet that won the British Quartet Championships, and the Black Dyke Octet. This interest would eventually lead him to form his own brass ensemble.

=== James Shepherd Versatile Brass and the Virtuosi Brass Band ===
In the early 1970s, he formed the James Shepherd Versatile Brass, a hand-picked 10-piece brass ensemble, and in 1973 he left Black Dyke to concentrate fully on the new ensemble. At first regarded with some suspicion by the brass band world, the ensemble gained a following after being featured in the Royal Albert Hall gala concert following the 1973 Brass Band National Championships, where it premiered Elgar Howarth's "Red Skye at Night", the first of many pieces written by various composers and arrangers for them.

The ensemble recorded 17 albums, and contributed the theme music for the 1983 sitcom Hallelujah!. He continued to play regularly with the group until 1989. The band continued, with Shepherd making occasional guest appearances, until they played for the last time at the Millgate Arts Centre in Delph on 16 December 2015.

In 1972, he was selected as principal cornet of the Virtuosi Brass Band of Great Britain, a recording ensemble of top players assembled by composer Eric Ball, and helped Ball to select the rest of the players. The ensemble would go on to record nine LPs for RCA Records.

In 1980 he won the Best Soloist prize at the Brass in Concert championships with the Ever Ready Band.

=== Teaching ===
Shepherd taught brass playing for many years in the Bradford area, with Bradford Music Service, and also coached the Queensbury Music Centre Band. After retirement, he continued to teach privately and contribute to masterclasses and workshops.

=== Recognition ===
In 1989 he was awarded the John Henry Iles Medal by the Worshipful Company of Musicians, recognising his contributions to the brass band movement.

A biography, entitled Legends in Brass: James Shepherd, The Famous Newbiggin-by-the-Sea Cornet Player, was written by Christopher D. Helme BEM and published by Mews Publishing in 1999.

In 2009, Jayess Newbiggin brass band was founded, named in honour of Shepherd.

In 2022, Brass Bands England presented Shepherd with a Lifetime Achievement Award at its annual conference.

=== Death ===
Shepherd died on 22 June 2023, at the age of 86. His obituary in the Daily Telegraph described him as "the outstanding cornet player of his generation.
