= Hammonds Band =

British brass band

- Brass Band
- Short name: Hammonds
- Former name: Hammond Saltaire Band, Hammond Sauce Works, Hammonds Saltaire Band, Hammonds Sauce, Hammonds Sauce Works, Hammond's Sauce Works, Hammonds Sauce Works Band, Hammonds Sauce Works Senior, Hammond's Sauce Works Senior, YBS Band, Yorkshire Building Society, Yorkshire Building Society Hammonds
- Founded: 1855 (170 years ago)
- Location: Huddersfield, West Yorkshire, England
- Music director: Morgan Griffiths
- Website: hammondsband.org.uk

The Hammonds Band, formerly also known as Hammonds Saltaire, YBS Band, Yorkshire Building Society Band, and Hammonds Sauce Works Band is a brass band originating from Yorkshire.

== History ==
The name of the band has often changed as sponsorship changed. The band was formed in 1855 under the name of Saltaire Band created by the mill owner Titus Salt. In 1946 the band was named Hammonds Sauce Band who came under the sponsorship of Hammonds Sauce Works in Shipley. They remained with this name for many years until Hammonds Sauce Works itself folded. In the early nineties Yorkshire Building Society started sponsoring the band and the name changed into Yorkshire Building Society Band. In 2004, however, the sponsorship ended and the band changed its name to YBS Band. In January 2009 the band changed their name to "Hammonds Saltaire Band". In 2022 the band changed names again to their current name "Hammonds Band".

== Recordings ==
A partial list of recordings the band has been involved in is shown below:

Year	Album	Conductor
1995	Elton John in Brass	Nicholas J. Childs
1995	That's a Plenty	Nicholas J. Childs & Manfred Obrecht
1996	Introduction	David King
1996	Essays for Brass Volume 1	David King
1997	Cry of the Celts	David King
1998	Essays for Brass Volume 2	David King
1999	Vitae Lux	David King
2001	Essays for Brass Volume 3	David King
2001	Voice of the Tenor Horn (Sheona White)	David King
2002	Windows of the World	David King
2002	Hymn of the Highlands	David King
2003	Bourgeois in Brass	David King
2003	Simple Gifts	David King
2004	Music of the Spheres	David King
2005	Alpha & Omega	David King
2005	Festive Impressions	
2011	The Big Picture	David King
2011	Dawn of a New Age	Morgan Griffiths
2012	The Sorcerer's Apprentice	Morgan Griffiths
2013	Pursuing Horizons	Morgan Griffiths
2022	Scarborough Fayre	Morgan Griffiths
