= Regent Hall =

Coordinates: 51°30′53″N 0°8′35″W

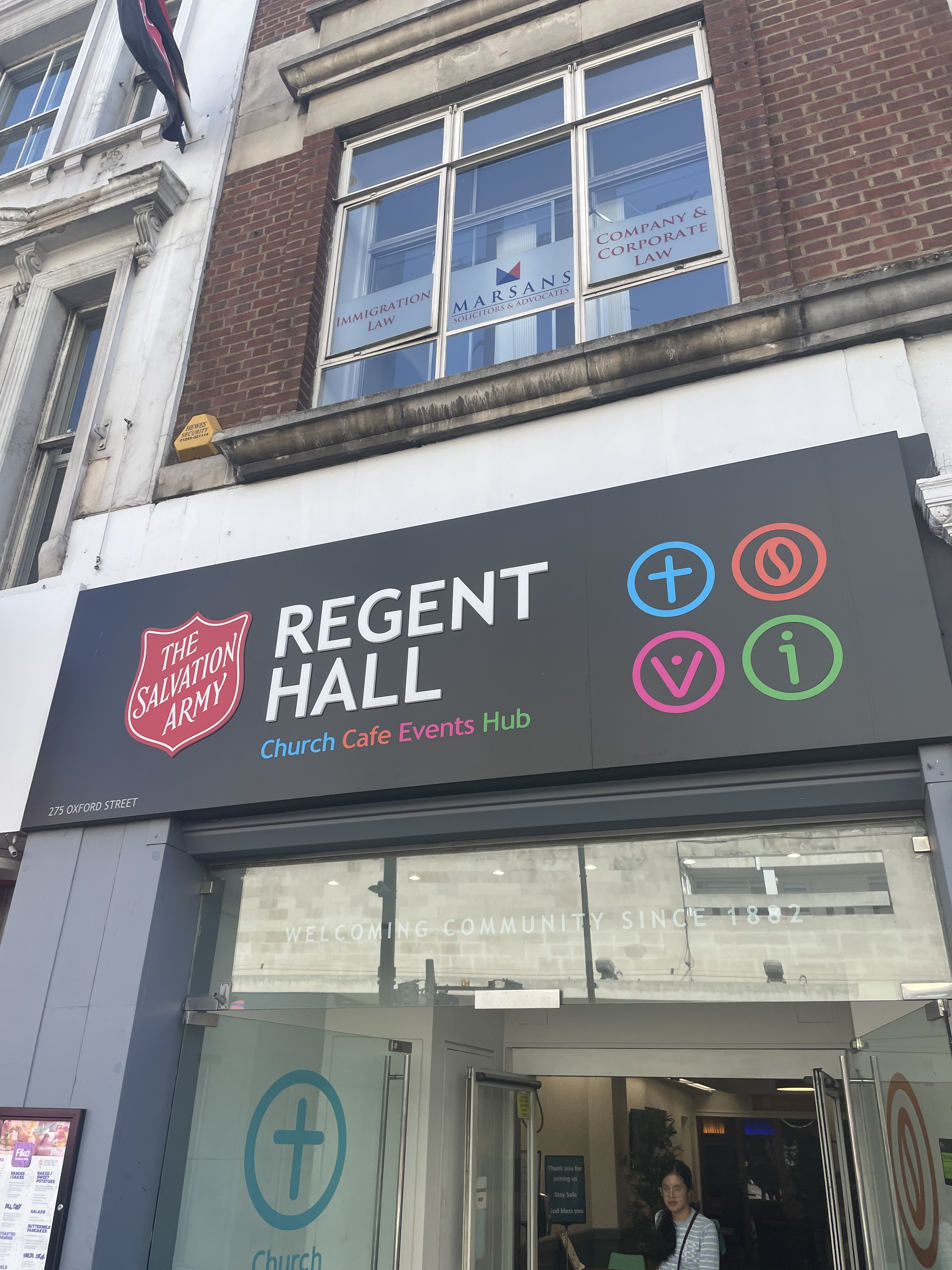
- Regent Hall entrance
- Regent Hall
- Location: Oxford Street, London
- Country: England
- Denomination: Salvation Army

The Regent Hall is a Salvation Army centre on London's Oxford Street. It is one of the oldest centres in London having been founded by the founder of the army, William Booth in 1882. The church is known as the "Rink", because it was formerly a skating rink.

The hall is known for its music, both for its own brass band which tours internationally, its high standard choral music, and as a venue for visiting artists.

The present officers are Majors Richard and Caroline Mingay, who succeeded Major Dawn and Major Graham Mizon in 2017.

== Facilities ==
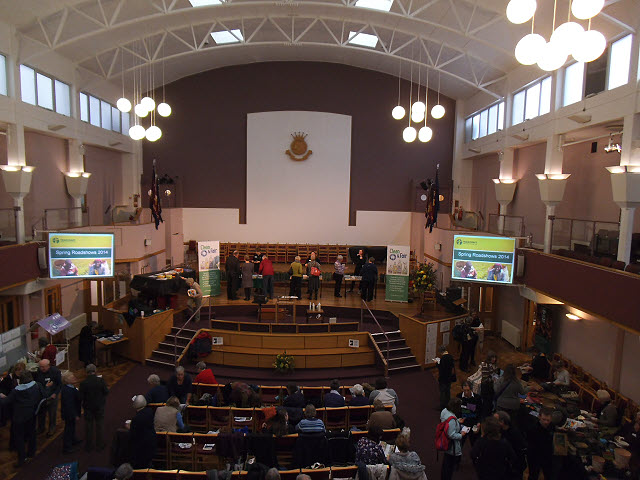
Regent Hall: interior

Booth bought the building on Oxford Street in 1882. Since then, 'The Rink' has had many major internal improvements, most recently in the summers of 2015 to 2017.

The main auditorium seats approximately 550, with a stage area that can accommodate an orchestra of around 50 to 60 members.
