= Year of the Dragon =

Year of the Dragon or The Year of the Dragon may refer to:

== Astrology ==
- Dragon (zodiac), Chinese Year of the Dragon zodiac sign

== Art, entertainment, and media ==
=== Films ===
- Year of the Dragon (1985 film), a film directed by Michael Cimino, starring Mickey Rourke
- Year of the Dragon (2025 film), a Canadian short drama film

=== Games ===
- Spyro: Year of the Dragon, a PlayStation video game released in 2000

=== Literature ===
- Year of the Dragon (1977), novel written by Joyce Dingwell
- The Year of the Dragon (1977), novel written by Basil Cooper
- Year of the Dragon (novel), 1981 novel written by Robert Daley
- The Year of the Dragon (play), a play by Frank Chin, later adapted into a film starring George Takei

=== Music ===
- In the Year of the Dragon, 1989 album by Geri Allen, Charlie Haden & Paul Motian
- Year of the Dragon (Busta Rhymes album)
- Year of the Dragon (EP) by Machine Head
- Year of the Dragon (Modern Talking album), 2000
- The Year of the Dragon (music), a three-movement work composed by Philip Sparke
- Year of the Dragon Tour Diary: Japan, EP from Machine Head

== See also ==
- Day of the Dragon (disambiguation)
