= Leyland Band =

BASS BAND LOCATED IN US

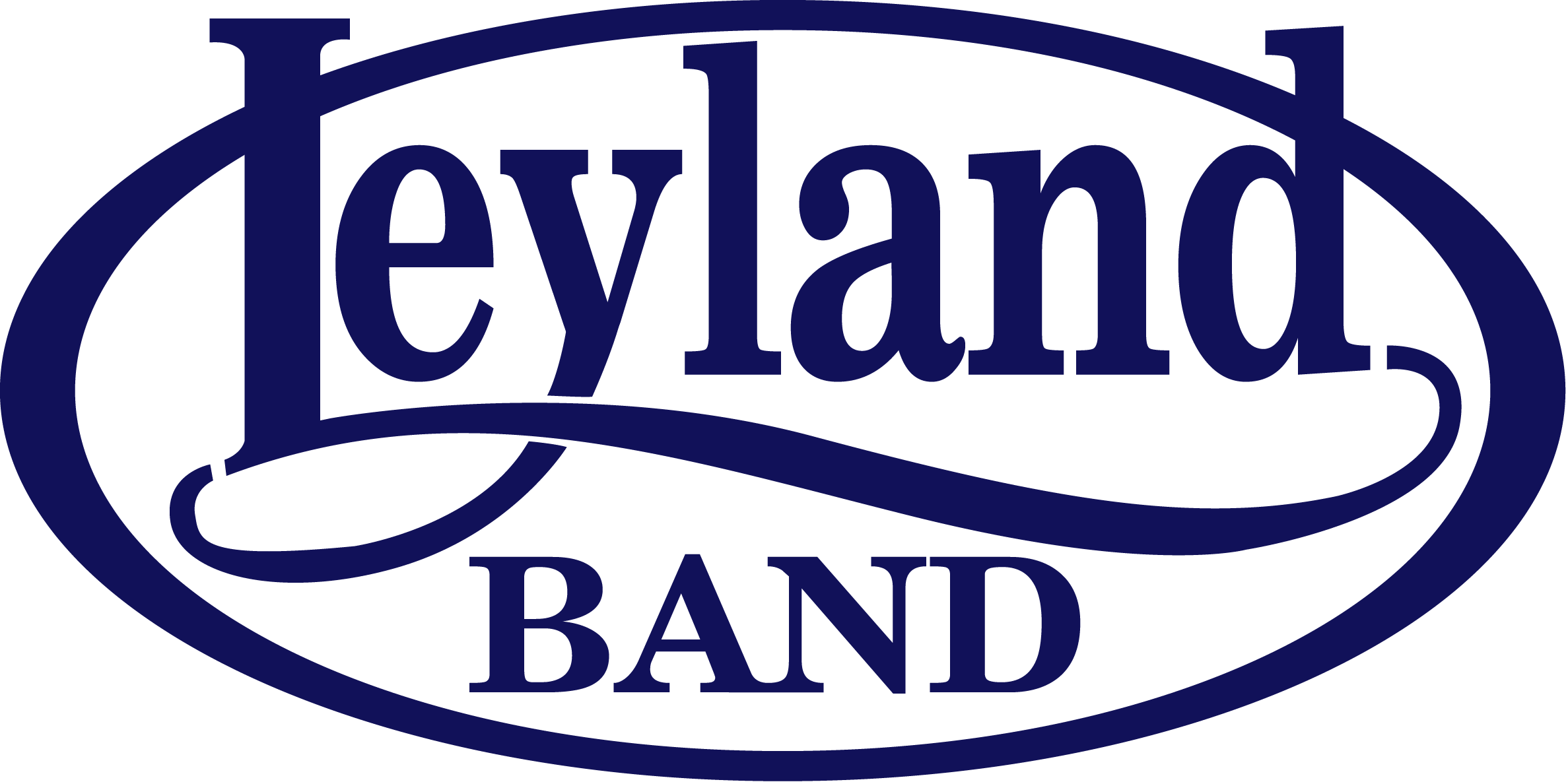
- Formation: 1946
- Type: Brass band
- Legal status: Registered Charity (No. 1129485)
- Headquarters: 14B Boxer Place, Moss Side Industrial Estate, Leyland, Lancashire, PR26 7QL.
- Location: Lancashire, UK
- Affiliations: Yamaha, University of Central Lancashire
- Website: https://www.leylandband.co.uk

The Leyland Band is a brass band based in Lancashire in the UK.

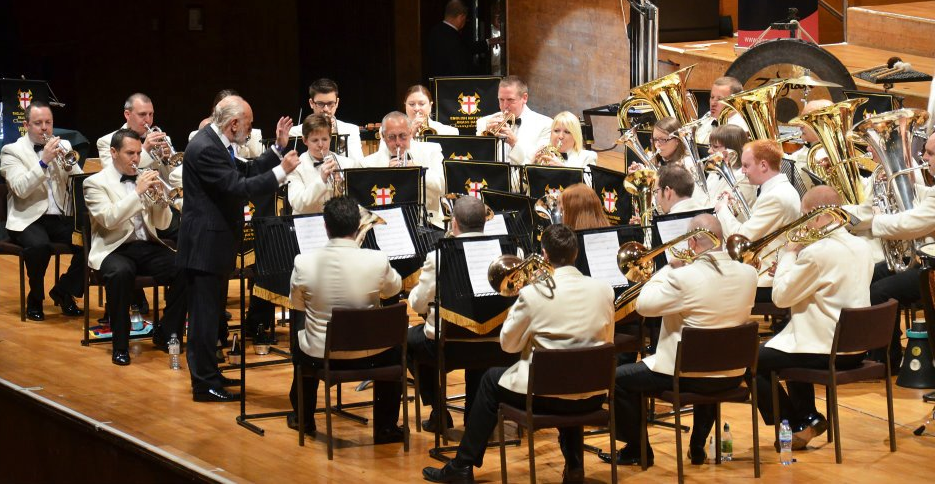

== History ==
The Leyland Band was established in 1946 in the heart of industrial Lancashire as the Leyland Motors Band, taking its name from the world famous truck and bus company. Now an independent group of around thirty musicians, the Band has retained its local connection and now bears the name of its home town.

The last twenty five years of the Bands existence has been the most consistently successful in its history. After a meteoric rise through the various sections, the Band has witnessed scores of prize awards at all the major competitions in the brass band arena.

The Leyland Band has performed both at home and abroad. In 1980, the ensemble was the first western brass band to tour Japan, a country it revisited along with South Korea in the 1990s. In the last decade, four coast to coast tours of the United States of America were undertaken as well as numerous performances on continental Europe. It has also had success at the Brass in Concert Championship of which it is the current title holder.

Leyland Band has appeared in numerous television and radio broadcasts, specifically for the Granada Band of the Year, BBC Radio 3 and Listen to the Band. It has an impressive discography and has recorded many commercial CDs.

== Previous Names ==
- Leyland Motors Band (1946–1979)
- Leyland Vehicles Band (1979–1988)
- Leyland DAF Band (1988–1992)
- BNFL (Leyland) Band (1992–1997)
- JJB Sports Leyland Band (1997–2000)

== Contest successes ==
- Champion Band of Great Britain: 2005
- British Open Champions: 1994
- All England Masters: 1989, 1992, 2003
- Brass in Concert Champions: 1989, 1991, 1992, 1997, 2011
- North West Regional Champions: 1982, 1990, 1991, 1993, 1994, 2004, 2005, 2012, 2013
- Grand Shield Champions (Spring Festival): 1981, 2008

== Conductors ==
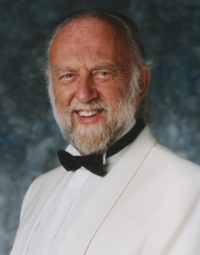
Richard Evans LTCL: Musical Director Emeritus
