= Grimethorpe Colliery Band =

Colliery band from England

- Brass Band
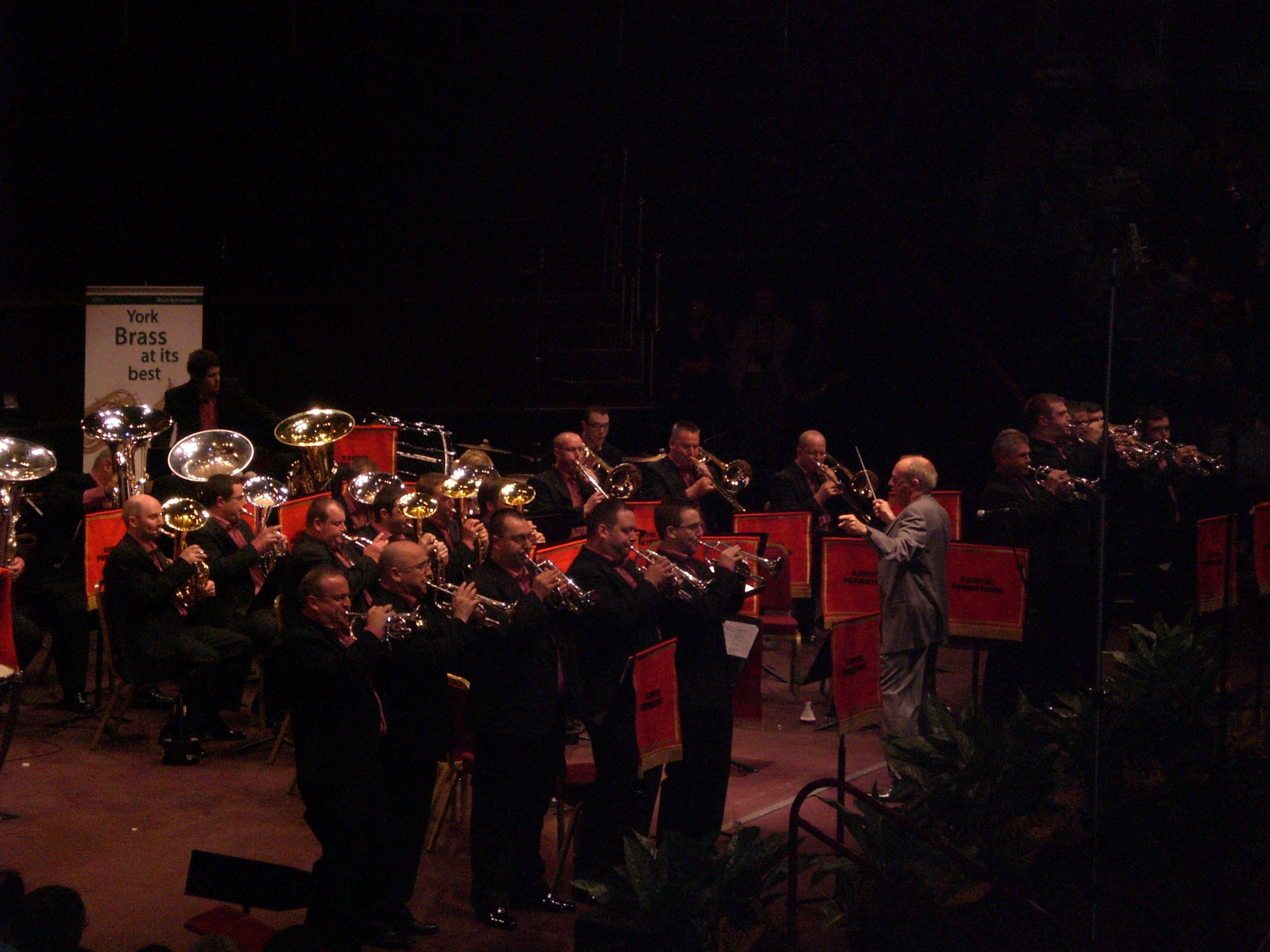
- Grimethorpe Band Nationals Concert 2008
- Former name: Grimethorpe Colliery (UK Coal), Grimethorpe Colliery Institute Band, Grimethorpe Colliery RJB, Grimethorpe Colliery Welfare, Grimethorpe Institute
- Founded: 1917 (109 years ago)
- Location: Grimethorpe, South Yorkshire, England
- Principal conductor: Allan Withington
- Music director: Ben Dixon
- Website: grimethorpeband.co.uk

The Grimethorpe Colliery Band is a brass band, based in Grimethorpe, South Yorkshire, England. It was formed in 1917, as a leisure activity for the workers at the colliery, by members of the disbanded Cudworth Colliery Band. Along with the Black Dyke Mills Band, the band became the first to perform at the Proms. Grimethorpe Band achieved fame after appearing in the film Brassed Off.

== History ==
The year after the band's formation saw it enter its first competition at Belle Vue in Manchester. Its first radio broadcast was in 1932 and from 1941 to 1951 it was on UK national radio every month.

George Thompson was musical director from the early 1950s until 1972 during which time the band won the British Open Contest for the first time. Thompson was followed by Elgar Howarth as Professional Conductor and Musical Director. 1974 saw the band, along with Black Dyke Mills Band, become the first to perform at the Proms.

The band continued through the industrial troubles of the 1980s and the closure of Grimethorpe Colliery on 13 October 1992. The band gained first place with 99 out of 100 on 17 October 1992 - just four days after the pit closure - in the National Brass Band Championships, conducted by Frank Renton at the Royal Albert Hall in London playing Philip Wilby's The New Jerusalem. This sequence of events inspired the plot of the film "Brassed Off" (see below).

Following the closure of the Grimethorpe Colliery in 1993, the Band was sponsored by RJB Mining (later UK Coal plc) and then by Powerfuel.

In 2016 the band asked Richard Corbett, Member of the European Parliament for Yorkshire, to be its Honorary President and in September 2018, the band played at the opening of the Labour Party annual conference in Liverpool.

== Rock and pop ==
The band has appeared on rock and pop records, including "When an Old Cricketer Leaves the Crease", on Roy Harper's 1975 HQ album, and Peter Skellern's 1978 and 1979 albums Skellern (including the hit single "Love Is the Sweetest Thing") and Astaire. In 1976, the band assisted comedian Max Bygraves in recording a song specially commissioned by the National Coal Board called "Do It The Safety Way", in order to promote safety procedures in coalmines.

One former member of the band, trombonist Andy Cato, went on to co-found electronic music duo Groove Armada.

== In films ==
The band achieved international fame following the success of the film Brassed Off, the plot of which was based on Grimethorpe's struggles against pit closures (see above), with the soundtrack being provided by the band. The band has subsequently played at several events (including three at the Royal Albert Hall) at which the film is projected and the band substitutes the sound track of the film with its live rendition.

The band also performed Ron Goodwin's film score for the 1976 Disney film Escape from the Dark (also called The Littlest Horse Thieves), with the composer conducting.

== Honours ==
- National Brass Band Championships – Winners 1970, 1992, 2006 and 2007.
- English National Brass Band Championships – Winners 2007, 2008.
- Yorkshire Champions – 1963, 1967, 1973, 1983, 1991, 1995, 2005, 2006.
- Brass in Concert Champions – 1977, 1979, 1980, 1981, 1983, 1986, 1993, 1994, 1999, 2001 to 2005, 2010 and 2014.
- Mineworkers' Champions – 1967, 1968, 1969, 1973 to 1980, 1983, 1985 to 2002.
- British Open Champions – 1969, 1984, 1991, 2015.
- Granada Band of the Year – 1972, 1973, 1976, 1977, 1981, 1985.

== Other events ==
The band represented England at the European Brass Band Championship in Norway in May 2008 and came second behind the Cory Band, both on 194 points. In June 2008, Grimethorpe gained its second successive victory at the English National Brass Band Championships, thus qualifying to represent England once again at the European Championships in Ostende, Belgium, in 2009. The band gained further worldwide attention with its rendition of the Olympic Hymn during the 2012 Summer Olympics Opening Ceremony in the Olympic Stadium, accompanied by the London Symphony Orchestra. In 2024, eight members of the band were invited to join Coldplay on the Pyramid Stage at Glastonbury Festival, performing the song "Humankind" to 125,000 live fans and a global TV audience of 2.5 million.

== Notable members ==
- Roger Webster – Former Principal Cornet
- Nicholas Childs – Former Solo Euphonium
- Andy Cato – Former Trombonist and co-founder of electronic music duo Groove Armada.
- Kevin Crockford - Former Soprano Cornet

== Partial discography ==
Year	Album	Conductor
1967	Black Diamonds	
1968	Hymns You Love	George Thompson
1968	Belle Vue Brass	George Thompson
1969	Christmas Praise	George Thompson
1970	Highlights in Brass	George Thompson
1974	Festival Band Series Vol. 3	George Thompson
1971	Salute to Gershwin	George Thompson
1971	Hymns You Love – Volume 2	George Thompson
1972	Brass versus the Classics	
1972	Grimethorpe Colliery Band Play the Music from….	
1973	Morning Has Broken	Dennis Wilby
1973	Hymns of Praise	Dennis Wilby
1973	Pop Goes the Posthorn	Elgar Howarth
1976	Grimethorpe Special	Elgar Howarth
1976	Do It the Safety Way (single with Max Bygraves)	
1976	Escape from the Dark – Disney (Original Soundtrack)	
1977	Classics for Brass Band	Elgar Howarth
1977	Band of the Year 1972, 1973, 1976	Elgar Howarth
1977	Band of the Year	Bryden Thompson
1979	Were You There? (single with the Kemsing Singers)	
1979	Skellern – Astaire	
1980	King Size Brass	Ray Farr
1980	Arrivederci Grimethorpe	Ray Farr
1980	The Centenary / The Boy I Love is On the Engine (single with Lorraine Hart)	
1985	The Age of Self / Raise Your Banners High (single with [Robert Wyatt] & GCHQ Trade Unions)	
1986	Firebird	Ray Farr
1986	Grimethorpe Entertains	David James
1989	Classic Brass	Frank Renton
1990	The Day the North Left Town (with the Wood Thieves)	
1991	A Night at the Opera	Elgar Howarth
1991	Cornet Roundabout (Alan Morrison, cornet soloist)	
1991	The Miner's Prayer	Frank Renton
1992	Paganini Variations	Frank Renton
1993	Wilby	Frank Renton & Garry Cutt
1993	Arnold on Brass	Elgar Howarth & Sir Malcolm Arnold
1993	The Old Rugged Cross	
1993	Grimethorpe Colliery Band plays Brass Favourites	Elgar Howarth
1993	Euphonium (Robin Taylor, euphonium soloist)	Garry Cutt
1993	Grimethorpe Plays World Hits	Garry Cutt & Manfred Obrecht
1994	Let's Face the Music and Dance	Garry Cutt
1995	Wagner	Elgar Howarth
1995	Stars in Brass	Frank Renton
1996	French Bonbons	Major Peter Parkes
1996	Brassed Off (Original Soundtrack)	John Anderson
1996	The Old Rugged Cross – 34 Brass Favourites	
1997	A White Christmas with Grimethorpe	Major Peter Parkes
1997	From Sonnets to Jazz	Major Peter Parkes
1998	The Melody Shop	Major Peter Parkes
1998	The Very Best of the Grimethorpe Colliery (UK Coal) Band	
1998	The Grimethorpe Colliery Band – 34 Brass Band Favourites	
1998	Bold As Brass	
1999	Grimethorpe Colliery Band – Australian Tour Edition	Elgar Howarth
1999	Brass from the Masters – Volume 2	Major Peter Parkes
2000	Brass Favourites from Grimethorpe	
2001	Eric Ball – The Undaunted	Elgar Howarth
2001	Movie Brass	
2001	Quincentenary Concert (with YBS Band)	
2001	Classic Brass	
2001	Brass Band Classics	
2002	Grimethorpe in Concert	Garry Cutt
2003	British Brass	
2003	Promenade	Elgar Howarth
2004	Grimethorpe in Concert Volume II	Richard Evans
2004	The History of Brass Band Music – The Golden Era	Elgar Howarth
2004	The History of Brass Band Music – The Salvation Army Connection	Elgar Howarth
2005	The History of Brass Band Music – The Early Years	Elgar Howarth
2005	Legends	
2005	Blaze (Richard Marshall, cornet soloist)	
2006	The History of Brass Band Music – The Modern Era	Elgar Howarth
2007	Grimethorpe in Concert Volume III	Richard Evans & Philip Harper
2007	The History of Brass Band Music – Classical Arrangements	Elgar Howarth
2008	The History of Brass Band Music – New Adventures	Elgar Howarth
2008	Hymns	Phillip McCann
2009	Classic Brass	
2010	Grimethorpe in Concert Volume IV	James Gourlay
2010	Hymns Volume II	James Gourlay
2010	Terra Australis – The Music of Martin Ellerby	James Gourley
2011	By Request	Brian Grant
2012	Your 20 Favourite Hymns	
2012	Grimethorpe Colliery Reunion Band: The Nationals 2012	
2015	Grimethorpe Entertain	Dr Robert Childs
2015	By Request II	Ray Farr & Robert Childs
2017	Grimethorpe 100	Misc
2020	Mysteries of the Horizon – The Music of Nigel Clarke	David Thornton & Sandy Smith
2022	Kashmiri Song	David Thornton
2023	Postcards from Grimethorpe	Jack Stamp & Ben Palmer
