= Cory Band =

Award-winning Welsh brass band

- Brass band
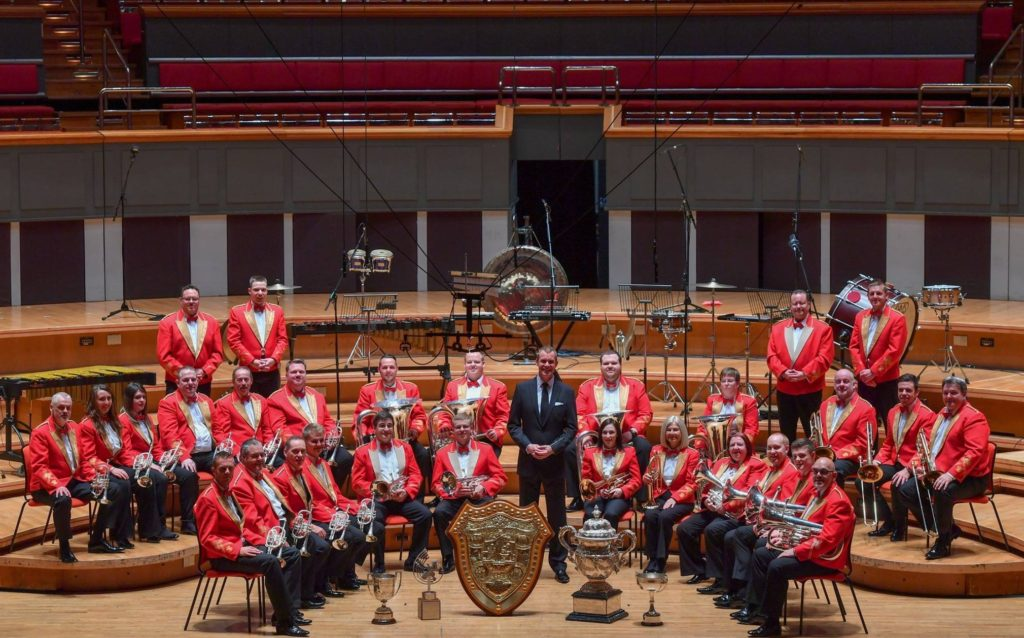
- The Cory Band that achieved a grand slam of all British major titles in 2016 and 2019
- Short name: Cory
- Former name: Ton Temperance Band
- Founded: 1884 (142 years ago)
- Location: Treorchy, Wales
- Principal conductor: Philip Harper
- Concertmaster: Kyle Lawson
- Website: coryband.com

The Cory Band is one of the oldest and best known award-winning brass bands in the world based in Treorchy of the Welsh Valleys, Britain.

Ranked the world's No. 1 brass band for 13 consecutive years, Cory made world history in 2016 by winning all three majors titles: 'Best Brass Band' at British, National and European championships – the banding world's Grand Slam – along with the Brass in Concert Championship title becoming the first band in history to be quadruple champions – simultaneously holding the National, Open, European, and Brass in Concert titles. Their reputation for excellence has spread throughout the world through their competition successes, numerous recordings, concerts and community outreach education programmes.

== History ==
The Cory Band was formed in 1884 originally as a competitive brass band bearing the name The Ton Temperance Band, a reference to the Temperance movement, in Rhondda of the South Wales Valleys, Britain.

In 1895, the band was invited to play at the official opening of Gelli Colliery Library in Ystrad where Sir Clifford Cory, the Chairman of Cory Brothers, heard the band and offered to provide financial assistance for them, resulting in the band's change of name to Cory Workmen's Band. In 1920, the band gained championship status and three years later achieved the distinction of performing at what is believed to have been the first radio broadcast by a brass band. In 1976 the band was chosen to represent Wales and the Brass Band Movement on a tour of the United States as part of the US bi-centennial celebrations. In 1980 the band became European Champions and in 1984, their centenary year, they won the third in a hat-trick of national titles at the Royal Albert Hall, London. In 1981, the band recorded a single with the Gwalia Singers on Stiff Records, a cover version of Jona Lewie's "Stop the Cavalry".

In 2000, the band achieved an historic double by winning both the Nationals and – for the first time in its history – the British Open under Dr. Robert Childs. In 2008–2010, the band achieved a hat trick of European Brass Band Champion titles.

=== Recent evolution ===
Cory Band has developed musically outside of the contest field. In 2001, together with the BBC National Orchestra of Wales they were appointed as resident ensemble to the Royal Welsh College of Music and Drama, and in the same year appointed Dr John Pickard as their Composer in Residence. John Pickard's tenure with the band ended in July 2005 when the band made history giving the première performance of his Gaia Symphony at the Cheltenham International Festival. The symphony was broadcast live on BBC Radio 3. Over an hour in duration, it is currently the largest scale original work in the repertory.

The band have an active commissioning policy and have performed works by British composers; John McCabe, Judith Bingham, Elgar Howarth, Edward Gregson, Alun Hoddinott, Karl Jenkins, Gareth Wood, David Bedford, as well as John Pickard. The band's current Associate Composer is Christopher Bond.

In 2002 the band were selected to play for the Queen's Golden Jubilee celebrations and have since performed in concert venues including the Grieg Hall, Stravinsky Hall, the Royal Albert Hall and Symphony Hall, Birmingham. In 2003, they performed with the Royal Philharmonic Orchestra at the Last Night of the Welsh Proms and were also featured during the opening celebrations of the new Wales Millennium Centre.

In 2007, following the end of the term of sponsorship from the Buy As You View company, the name of the band reverted to the name under which it has enjoyed most success: Cory Band.

In October, 2019, the band became the National Brass Band Champions of Great Britain, for the 9th time. Their 10th victory followed in the 2026 contest.

== Titles and honours ==
- National Champions - 1974, 1982, 1983, 1984, 2000, 2013, 2015, 2016, 2019, 2026
- British Open Champions - 2000, 2002, 2007, 2009, 2011, 2016, 2018, 2019
- European Champions - 1980, 2008, 2009, 2010, 2013, 2016, 2019, 2022
- Brass In Concert Champions - 2008, 2012, 2013, 2015, 2016, 2018, 2019, 2024
- World Music Contest Champions 2009 - 2012
- Band Cymru Champions 2014, 2016, 2018

== See also ==
- List of brass bands
- Music of Wales
