= Brass band sections in the United Kingdom =

As part of the British brass band tradition of contesting, bands are split into five main brass band sections in the United Kingdom. These are the Championship, First, Second, Third, and Fourth sections. In some contests, a Youth section is also used, but this is not graded. The adjudicator for qualifying contests sits enclosed and unable to see the bands as they play, and then judges them on various points, one of which is interpretation.

== Championship section ==
This is the section containing the very best bands in the United Kingdom. Bands such as Cory Band, Black Dyke, Brighouse and Rastrick, Fairey and Grimethorpe are placed in here. A few of these have professional or semi-professional players, but the contest has always been designed towards amateur musicians.

Many of these bands also compete in the British Open Brass Band Championships, established in 1853, and become representatives of their nations in the European Brass Band Championships.

The test pieces set for or commissioned by this section are extremely difficult and use complicated musical conventions and techniques to challenge the musicians.

The top ten bands in the Championship section (ordered by Band Supplies / British Bandsman / 4barsrest.com Ranking, as at October 2024) are:

Pos	Ranking	Band	Region
1	2	Foden's	North West
2	3	Cory Band	Wales
3	4	Black Dyke	Yorkshire
4	6	Tredegar	Wales
5	7	Flowers Band	West of England
6	8	Brighouse and Rastrick	Yorkshire
7	10	Grimethorpe Colliery	Yorkshire
8	14	Carlton Main Frickley Colliery Band	Yorkshire
9	16	KNDS Fairey	North West
10	17	The Cooperation Band	Scotland

== First, Second, and Third sections ==
The degree of difficulty of the music used in competitions is progressively less for each section. Many individual players in the First section can match the virtuosity of Championship section players, and the gap between the two sections is always hotly contested, as indeed it is between Second and First. Very often the only reason a band from the top of one section does not successfully migrate up to the next section lies in their interpretation of a test piece at a contest, where their fate lies in the hands of an adjudicator. In the past, deportment was one of the judgeable factors, but this is no longer part of contest judgement. On many occasions success or failure will depend on very small matters or mistakes, and this closeness between bands often increases in the higher sections.

== Fourth section ==
Most Fourth section bands try to move up the ranks to Third section, and so they set themselves musical tasks to enable them to improve. These tend to include the simpler marches and old test pieces. The marches and other compositions of the Welsh composer and conductor T. J. Powell remain constant favourites.

One of the principal reasons for a decline into Fourth section status lies in the difficulties of recruiting new players. In the past when Britain had extensive heavy industries, these would sponsor brass bands, who would then bear their name. For example, the once-great Melin Griffith Band of Cardiff was adopted by Excelsior Rope Works when the Melingriffith Tin Plate Works closed down, and then they became the Excelsior Rope Works Band. The decline in industrial sponsorship removed the financial backing which supported such vital items as a practice room, uniforms, instruments, stands, chairs, and music, which taken together cost far more than a subscription band can ever afford. However, with very few exceptions, these bands have been struggling to get by supported only by the members' subscriptions, the occasional sponsored concerts, and playing Christmas carols. Not infrequently, practice rooms become unavailable, adding still more to the pressure to disband, and many bands have disappeared or amalgamated in recent years. A further problem is that players of ability would normally rather play in a band which stretches them, so it becomes hard to recruit good players for a lower section band, and this increases the problem.

== Youth section ==
Youth bands are not usually registered and are not graded, and so they do not really compare with the above sections. However, Youth bands may be permitted to perform in competitions. At some major competitions (e.g. Whit Friday), there is a youth section prize awarded, but this is not common.

Youth bands suffer from some perennial problems, because players grow too old for the band and leave, causing the strength of the band to wane and then grow again. Also, as many youth band players are not fully-grown, they do not have the sound capacity of the adult bands; however, this may be offset by their enthusiasm.

The quality of the top three or four youth bands is comparable to the top First section and lower Championship section bands. However, due to their perennial problems, they do not often maintain that standard.

The main competitions for youth bands are the Action Medical Research Youth Entertainment Championships, the National Youth Brass Band Championships of Great Britain, and the brass band section of Music for Youth.

The current National Youth Brass Band Champions of Great Britain (2024) are Wardle Academy Youth Band, and they will represent England at the European Brass Band Championships in Stavanger, Norway in May 2025. Their victory ended an impressive 10-year run of titles by Youth Brass 2000. The 2025 contest will take place at Hymers College, Hull on Saturday 29 March.

== The National Brass Band Championships of Great Britain ==
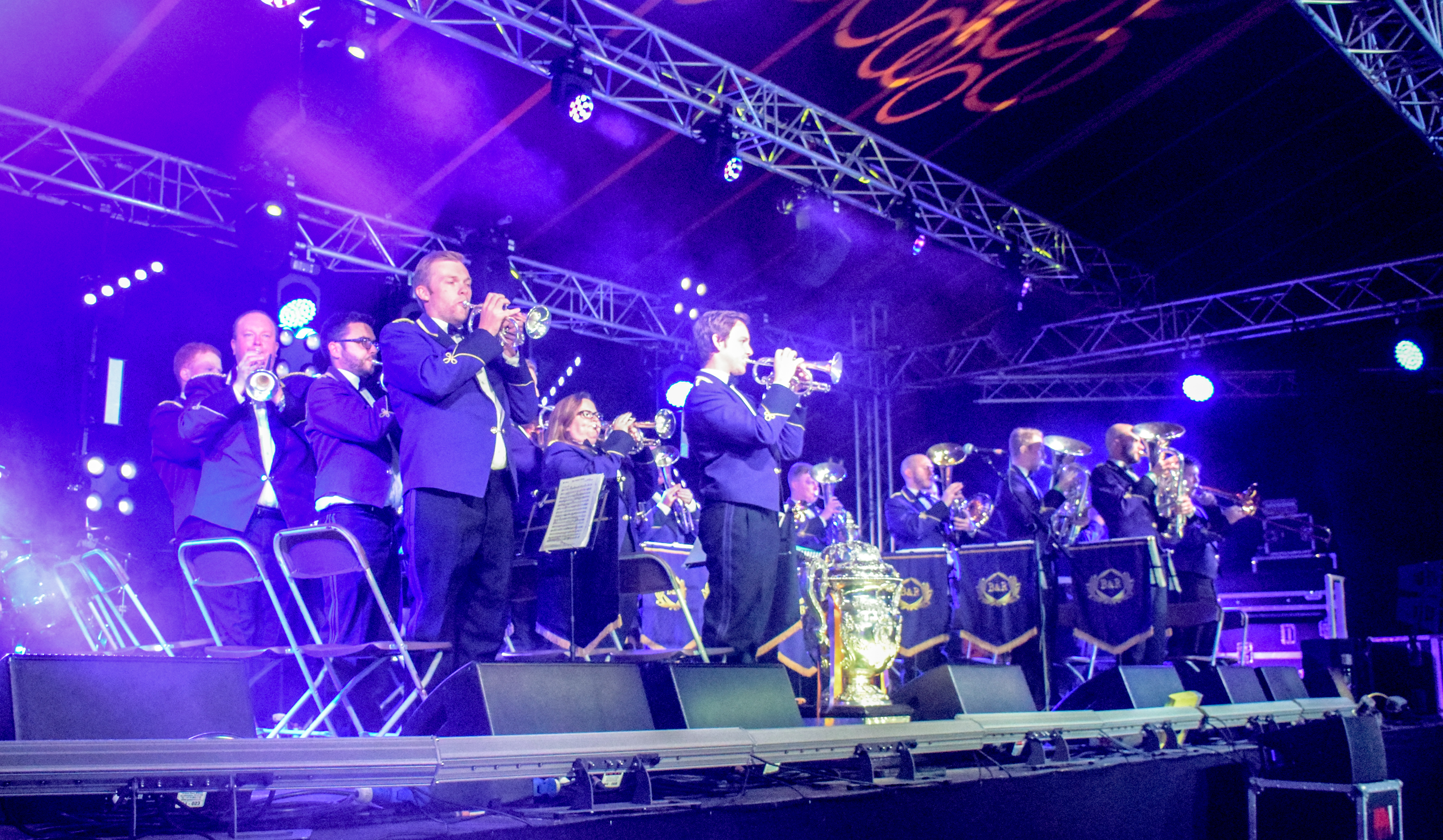
2017 champions Brighouse and Rastrick playing at Towersey Festival 2018 with the championship trophy displayed

Founded in 1860, the National Brass Band Championships are the annual national competition where bands compete against each other. The first round of the championships are the Area contests where bands across all sections compete to qualify for the national Finals. There are eight Areas: West of England, London & Southern Counties, Midlands, Wales, North West, Yorkshire, North of England, and Scotland. The Area contests usually take place between late February and mid March.

The second part of the competition – the Finals – takes place the following September or October. Each section is assigned its own test piece. The Area test pieces are usually announced at the lower section Finals in September (or sometimes even before). In early June (after the qualifying bands from the Area contests have been decided), the set works for the Finals are announced.

Since the Lower Section Finals in 2011, the Finals of Sections 1 through 4 are held at The Centaur, Cheltenham Racecourse, and the Championship Section Finals are held in the Royal Albert Hall, London.

=== Championship Winners ===
Year	Band	Region	Conductor	Test Piece
2026	Cory Band	Wales	Philip Harper	A Road Less Travelled By
2025	Desford Colliery Band	Midlands	David Morton	Symphony in Two Movements
2024	Flowers Band	West of England	Paul Holland	Harrison's Dream
2023	Black Dyke Band	Yorkshire	Nicholas Childs	Of Men and Mountains
2022	Foden's Band	North West	Russell Gray	Hyperlink
2021	Foden's Band	North West	Russell Gray	Heroes
2019	Cory Band	Wales	Philip Harper	Titan's Progress
2018	Foden's Band	North West	Russell Gray	Handel in the Band
2017	Brighouse and Rastrick Band	Yorkshire	David King	Gallery
2016	Cory Band	Wales	Philip Harper	Journey of the Lone Wolf
2015	Cory Band	Wales	Philip Harper	Spiriti
2014	Black Dyke Band	Yorkshire	Nicholas Childs	The Legend of King Arthur
2013	Cory Band	Wales	Philip Harper	Of Distant Memories
2012	Foden's Band	North West	Allan Withington	Daphnis et Chloé, 2nd Suite
2011	Brighouse and Rastrick Band	Yorkshire	David King	Breath of Souls
2010	Brighouse and Rastrick Band	Yorkshire	David King	Terra Australis
2009	Black Dyke Band	Yorkshire	Nicholas Childs	The Torchbearer
2008	Black Dyke Band	Yorkshire	Nicholas Childs	Concertino for Brass Band [Downie]
2007	Grimethorpe Colliery Band	Yorkshire	Allan Withington	Music for Battle Creek

== British contesting year ==
Other organisations' contests and championships are spread out over the year. A typical calendar might look as follows:

February	UniBrass Championships Local Association Contests: NEMBBA, ODBBA, Welsh Open
March	Regional Qualifying Contests National Youth Brass Band Contest Local Association Contests: SCABA, South Cumbria
April	Local Association Contests: Buxton, ConsTest, Fife, Fleetwood, Holme Valley, Isle of Man
May	European Championships Spring Festival Local Association Contests: SBBA
June	Whit Friday Marches March & Hymn Tune Contests: Brighouse, Darwen, East Midlands, Hebden Bridge, Meltham, Morley, Newtown, Wetherby Local Association Contests: Bold As Brass, Brass at Beamish, Kirkby Lonsdale, WEBF
August	National Eisteddfod of Wales Local Association Contests: Bandamonium, SBBA
September	British Open Lower Section National Finals March & Hymn Tune Contests: Boarshurst Local Association Contests: Dr Martin Trust, Fife, Red Admiral, SCABA
October	Championship Section National Finals Local Association Contests: Challenging Brass, ODBBA, Rochdale, Stanley, West Wales BBA
November	Brass in Concert Scottish Open Local Association Contests: DCBBA, GBBA, LBBA, NEMBBA, SBBA, SEWBBA, SWBBA, Wessex BBA, Wychavon

== Promotion and relegation ==
At the end of the competing season, the top two bands from each section are promoted to the next section up, and the bottom two are relegated to the section below. Several factors are used in determining who is promoted and relegated, and a band must perform consistently for three years, because the scores are aggregated over the previous two years. Therefore, a relegated band will usually have to spend at least two years in the section below before it can make its comeback.

There are some shortcuts; for example, a band winning the National Title for its section is automatically promoted for the following year.

== Brass band rankings ==
Controversial rankings of the bands are published by 4BarsRest and Brass Band World; however, each should be compared by how they compile their rankings. Often it is the band which has competed successfully in the most competitions that wins the highest ranking. However, some competitions give more points than others, so this also affects who is number one.

== Non-contesting bands ==
Participation in the whole contesting and ranking exercise is not compulsory, and there exist brass bands in the UK which for any number of reasons choose not to do so; these are known as non-contesting bands.

== University bands ==
There are around 40 university brass bands (or brass ensembles) in the UK. Like Youth bands, university bands are usually not registered, as many players also play with nearby registered bands. Furthermore, the standard of many university brass bands oscillates widely every year when a third of their players graduate and are replaced. This means the standard contesting sections can struggle to reflect the actual standard of the bands. The main inter-university brass band contest is UniBrass, the National University Brass Band Championships of Great Britain and Northern Ireland. UniBrass is an annual entertainment contest organised by students, supported by the UniBrass Foundation (a registered charity in England and Wales). University bands are separated into two sections, the Trophy and the Shield, which run concurrently over one day in February. The first UniBrass contest took place in Lancaster in 2011. UniBrass 2025 was hosted by the University of Cardiff.

The current National University Brass Band Champions of Great Britain and Northern Ireland are the University of Birmingham, having won the UniBrass Trophy in 2025. Sheffield University & Sheffield Hallam University Brass Band won the UniBrass Shield in 2025.

Even those university bands who are not registered often compete in contests which allow "scratch", unregistered, or university bands. Some major competitions (e.g. Whit Friday) award a university section prize, but this is even rarer than for youth bands.

== See also ==
- Musical instrument
