= Brighouse and Rastrick Brass Band =

British brass band

Brighouse and Rastrick Band
- Brass Band
- Short name: Briggus
- Former name: Brighouse & Rastrick Band, Brighouse and Rastrick Temperance Band, Brighouse Temperance
- Founded: 1881 (145 years ago)
- Location: Brighouse, West Yorkshire, England
- Principal conductor: Prof. David King
- Music director: Dr. David Thornton
- Website: brighouseandrastrick.com

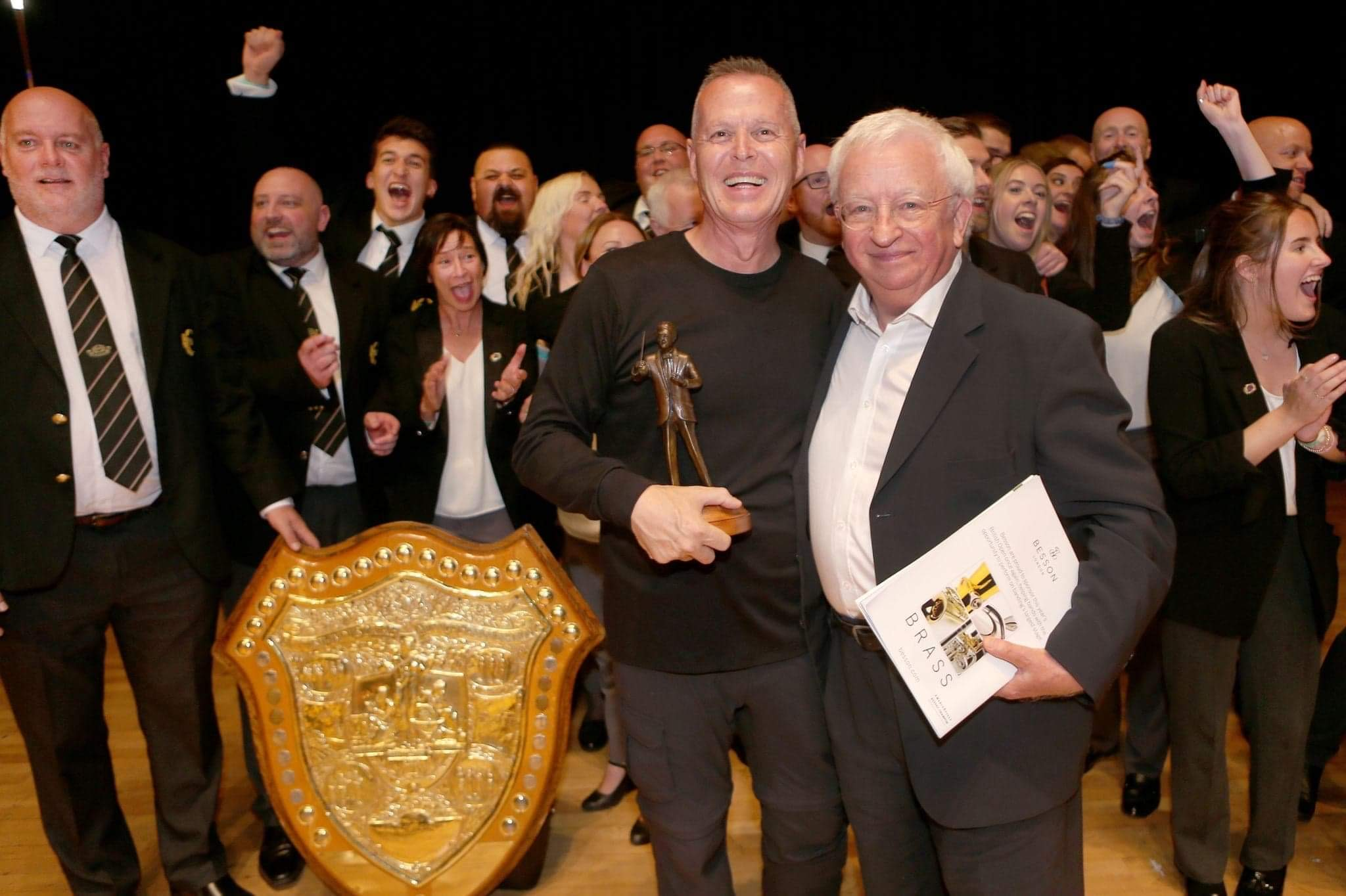
The Brighouse and Rastrick band celebrating their victory at the 2025 British Open Championships

The Brighouse and Rastrick Brass Band is a British brass band formed in 1881. The band is based in Brighouse, in Calderdale, West Yorkshire, England. The band is known across the world, and is regarded by many as the best and most consistent "public subscription band" in the world. In 2022 the band were British Open champions, the Brass in Concert champions, and were voted 2022 4barsrest Band of the Year. The band are regarded as one of the finest brass bands in history, and are in high demand across the globe.

== History ==
Throughout its history, the majority of premier band championships have been held by Brighouse and Rastrick, whilst the band has also attracted a formidable reputation for entertaining concerts for both the general public and brass band connoisseur.

The band was formed over 140 years ago in 1881, through public donations given by the townsfolk of the adjacent villages of Brighouse and Rastrick, that face each other across the River Calder in West Yorkshire, England.

Today, it still continues to be supported through public subscriptions and its own fund raising efforts. Its “amateur” members traditionally pride themselves on being financially independent, never having been beholden to any commercial interest, yet they are still regarded as one of the "elite" on the contest and concert platforms.

Since January 1995, the band has practised at their purpose-built hall and music library called West Ridings at Brighouse High School on Finkil Street in the north of Brighouse.

In 2009 (when conducted by Richard Evans), Brighouse and Rastrick achieved "Most Entertaining Band" at Brass in Concert. In 2010 (when conducted by Professor David King) they won the Regional Championship in Yorkshire, regarded as the strongest region for banding in the world and the National Championships of Great Britain, a competition held at London's Royal Albert Hall. This feat was replicated the following year, the Yorkshire Championship title in 2011 and the National Championship title. Along with the contest successes, followers of brass band website 4barsrest.com voted Brighouse & Rastrick and conductor David King "Band of the Year 2011" and "Conductor of the Year 2011" respectively.

In 2012, the band were therefore aiming for a hat trick of wins at both events, only to be pipped to second place at each. With another second placing in Yorkshire and a fourth placing at the National Finals in 2013, it has taken until 2014 for B&R to reclaim the Yorkshire title under the leadership of David King. The band's principal cornet player Stuart Lingard was awarded the "Best Principal Cornet" for his contribution.

== "The Floral Dance" ==
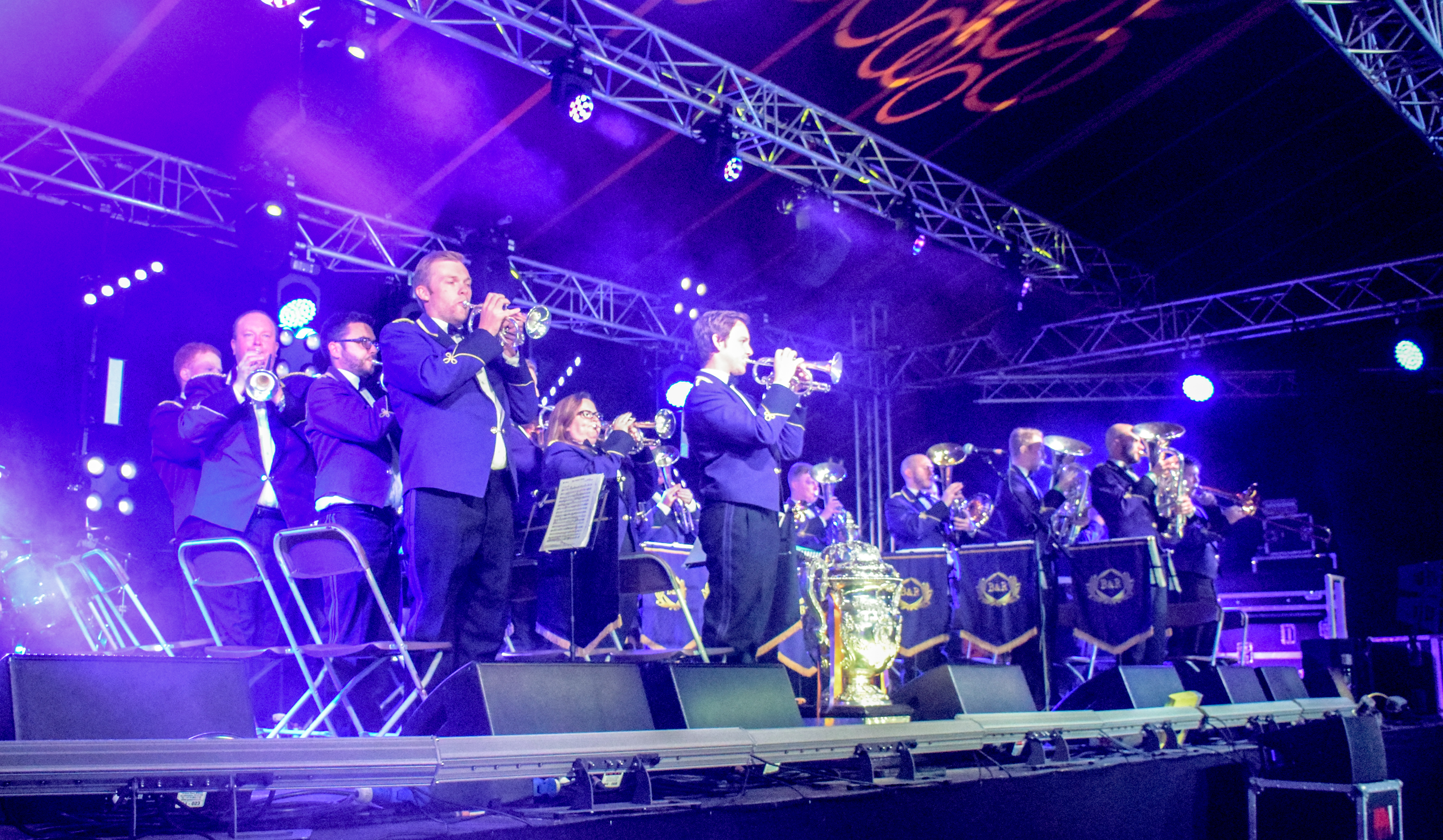
Brighouse and Rastrick playing their finale, "The Floral Dance", at Towersey Festival 2018, with the National Brass Band Championships of Great Britain trophy displayed

In November 1977, the band reached number 2 in the UK Singles Chart with their recording of "The Floral Dance", where they stayed for six weeks, only surpassed at the time by "Mull of Kintyre" (the first UK single to sell more than two million copies, and third best selling UK single of all time). It was arranged for the band by Derek Broadbent. The B-side was a version of "Girl with the Flaxen Hair", although some copies had a composition by Broadbent entitled "Bachelor Girls" as its B-side. The single also reached Number 37 on the Australian charts. The corresponding album, The Floral Dance, reached Number 10 in the UK Albums Chart. In 2016, the band performed the number on BBC One's The One Show special Terry Wogan tribute episode. The piece is still a firm favourite with audiences to this day.

== Honours since 2010 ==
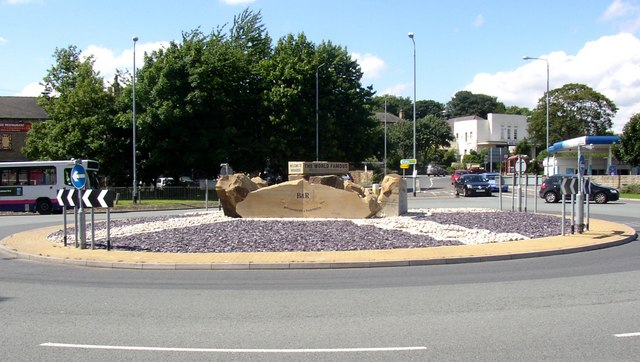
Roundabout in Brighouse

- 2011, 2013, 2016, 2017, 2018, 2019,2023 Saddleworth Whit Friday Champions
- 2022, 2025 British Open Brass Band Champions
- 2022 Brass in Concert Champions
- 2022 4Barsrest Band of the Year
- Yorkshire Regional Champions: Winners 2010, 2011, 2014, 2019
- National Brass Band Championships of Great Britain: Winners 2010, 2011, 2017

== Conductors ==
Musical director - Professor David King

Australian by birth, David King has led a career as an international conductor, instrumentalist, music educator and consultant spanning over 40 years.

David King was awarded the title ‘International Brass Musician of the Year’ in 1992 and completed his Doctor of Musical Arts degree in 2000 – the first recipient of a performance research doctorate awarded within the British university sector. In 2003 he was awarded professorial status and prior to 2009 was chair of music – performance at the University of Salford, England.

From 2004 to 2007 Professor David King was course director of the University of Salford MA music programme – the largest externally delivered music education programme linked with the Ministry of Defence (United Kingdom) and Her Majesty's Royal Marines.

In 2002 Professor David King was appointed conductor and musical director of the ‘Massed Bands of the North West of England’ performing in the closing ceremony of the Commonwealth Games in Manchester. He was also guest conductor at the World Expo, Switzerland 2002.

David King has represented England in the European Brass Band Championships as a conductor on thirteen occasions, winning the title an unprecedented ten times.

He has also won the Norwegian National Championships on ten occasions and has been awarded the Mortimer Award as winning conductor at the British Open Championships on four occasions (YBS Band) and the Royal Albert Hall National Championships of Great Britain in 2010, 2011 & 2017 (Brighouse & Rastrick Band).

Professor David King achieved an unprecedented ‘grand slam’ in 2003 as winning conductor at all four major international music festivals in the same year – Norwegian National Championships (Stavanger Band), European Championships (YBS Band), British Open Championships (YBS Band), and the North American National Brass Band Championships (Stavanger Band).

As principal conductor and musical director of the legendary YBS Band (1993 – 2006) David King's performance research and recording portfolio includes a definitive three-volume compilation, ‘Essays for Brass’ (Polyphonic Label), which has received unprecedented international acclaim within the World of Brass.

Regarded by his peers as a leading interpreter of wind music, Professor David King has commissioned, choreographed, directed and premiered award-winning thematic projects for the concert platform, working in collaboration with internationally acclaimed composers for the genre. These include Cry of the Celts, Voice of the Vikings, Hymn of the Highlands, Celtic Fusions, Symphonic Dances and War of the Worlds.

In 2005 Professor King conducted and directed the ‘Kings of Europe’ YBS Australian tour which culminated in the world premiere of two major commissioned works performed in the Sydney Opera House – Sunburnt Land (composer Professor Brenton Broadstock) and Terra Australis (composer Dr. Martin Ellerby).

A recipient of the Iles Medal from The Worshipful Company of Musicians (London), David King was awarded emeritus professorship by the University of Salford, UK in 2010.

For the past decade Professor King has maintained an active profile both as a freelance international conductor and music educator. From 2008 to 2015 he was artistic director of the National Australia Brass Festival (NABfest) and music director of Australia's first National Youth Band (2013–2016).

Professor David King is currently the international chair in band studies at the Royal Northern College of Music, Manchester, UK. He is also director of the National Australia Brass Academy and in 2018 was appointed musical director of the newly founded National Youth Brass Band of America.

Other conductors

Throughout the band's history, there have been many conductors who have crossed the threshold of the West Yorkshire bandroom. Many notable conductors in the brass band world have been at the helm since 1881, including such names as:

- Fred Berry
- William Halliwell
- Harry Mortimer
- Eric Ball
- Alex Mortimer
- Walter Hargreaves
- James Scott
- Derek Broadbent
- Geoffrey Brand
- James Watson
- Allan Withington
- James Gourley
- Richard Evans
- Russell Gray

This is by no means an exhaustive list of all the conductors the band has had, yet it illustrates the range of musicians associated with the band. Some of notable names have worked with the band, and the band continues to build on that legacy.

== Players ==
- Principal Cornet: Tom Smith
- Assistant Principal Cornet: Bethan Plant
- Solo Cornets: Ginette Nurney, Ed Tyler
- Soprano Cornet: Ashley Marston
- Repiano Cornet: Alicia Davis
- Second Cornets: Hayley Moore, Natalie Morrison
- Third Cornets: TBD, Ian Broadbent
- Flugel Horn: Lucy Cutt
- Solo Horn: Andy Moore
- First Horn: Alice Clarke
- Second Horn: Ian Dust
- Solo Baritone: Paul Haigh
- Second Baritone: Steve Cavanagh
- Solo Trombone: Joe Heartfield
- Second Trombone: Steve Walker
- Bass Trombone: Ollie Atherton
- Solo Euphonium: Chris Robertson
- Second Euphonium: Angus Ritchie
- E♭ Basses: Solo - Shaun Crowther, 2nd - Will Evans
- B♭ Basses: Solo - Chris Hardy, 2nd - Dave Long
- Percussion: Sam Milton, Harriet Kwong, Jonathan Kenna, Ross Royal

== See also ==
- Furry Dance
- List of one-hit wonders on the UK Singles Chart
