= Brass band =

Musical ensemble consisting of brass instruments

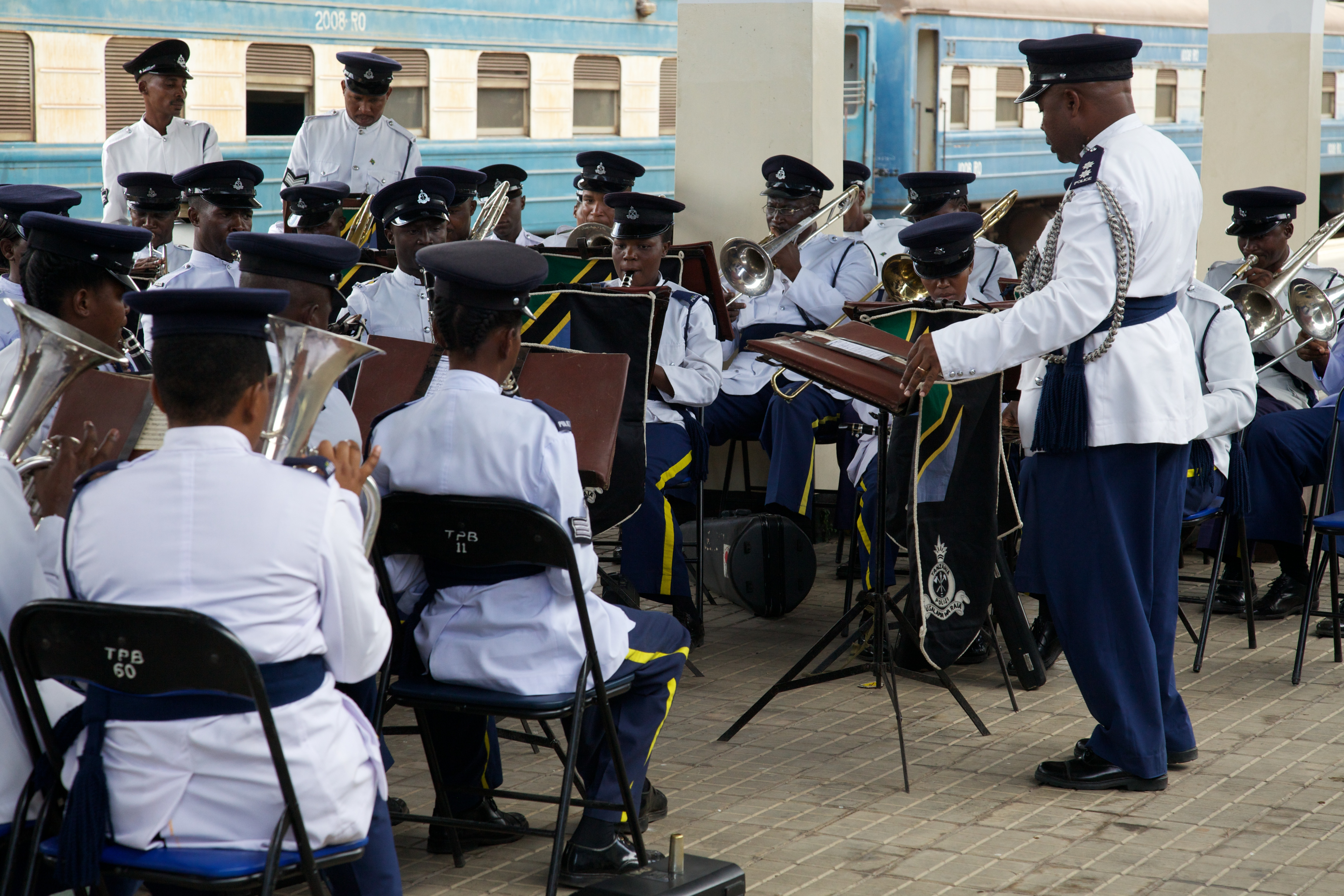
Tanzanian Police Force brass band

A brass band is a musical ensemble generally consisting primarily of brass instruments, most often with a percussion section. Ensembles that include brass and woodwind instruments can in certain traditions also be termed brass bands (particularly in the context of New Orleans and Japan–style brass bands), but may be more correctly termed military bands, concert bands, or "brass and reed" bands.

== Styles ==
=== Balkan ===
Balkan-style Brass Bands (Serbian: Труба, trumpet) play a distinctive style of music originating in 19th century Balkans. The music's tradition stems from the First Serbian Uprising led by Karađorđe in 1804 when Serbs revolted against the occupying Ottoman Empire, eventually liberating Serbia. The trumpet was used as a military instrument to wake and gather soldiers and announce battles, the trumpet took on the role of entertainment during downtime, as soldiers used it to transpose popular folk songs. It is popular throughout the Balkans, especially Serbia, Albania, North Macedonia, Bulgaria and Northern Greece. The tempos are usually fast and accompanied by kolo. The performers each have their instrument of the orchestra and are called trubači (трубачи). The best known examples of acclaimed music in this style are from Goran Bregović and Boban Marković Orkestar. The Serbian film maker Emir Kusturica has, through his films (Underground and Black Cat, White Cat), made the style popular in the international community outside the Balkans.

=== British-style ===
A brass band in the British tradition with a full complement of 28 players (including percussion) consists of:

- 1 Soprano cornet in E♭
- 9 Cornets in B♭ (in separate parts for 'solo', 'repiano', 2nd and 3rd cornets; there are 4 players on the 'solo' part, one repiano, two 2nd, and two 3rd)
- 1 Flugelhorn in B♭ (notated on the same part as the 'repiano' in some older music)
- 3 Tenor horns in E♭ (called solo, 1st and 2nd)
- 2 Baritone horns in B♭ (each with separate parts)
- 2 Tenor trombones (notated in B♭, playing separate parts)
- 1 Bass trombone (the only brass instrument in the band notated in Concert Pitch (C) on bass clef)
- 2 Euphoniums in B♭ (usually playing the same part with divisi sections)
- 4 Tubas (2 in E♭ and 2 in B♭, both notated in treble clef; often called Basses)
- 2 or 3 percussion players (with 2 or more timpani, glockenspiel, snare drum, triangle, cymbals, a drum kit and more)
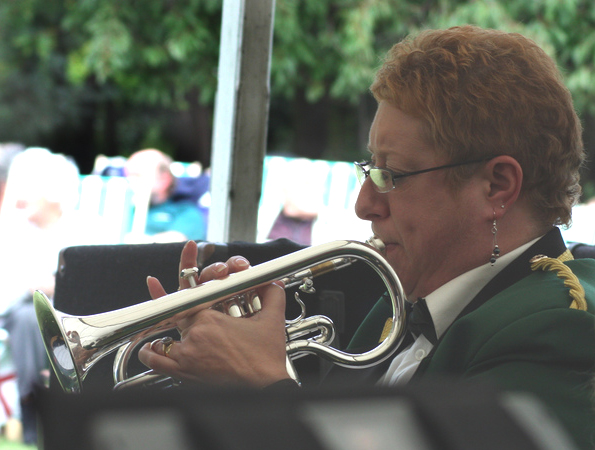
Soprano cornet

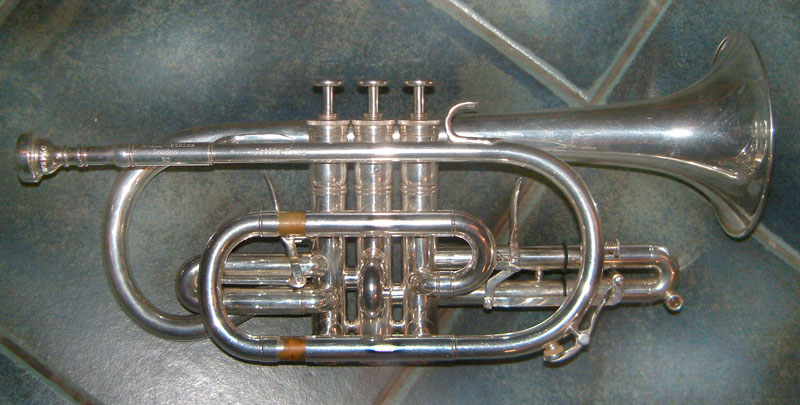
Cornet

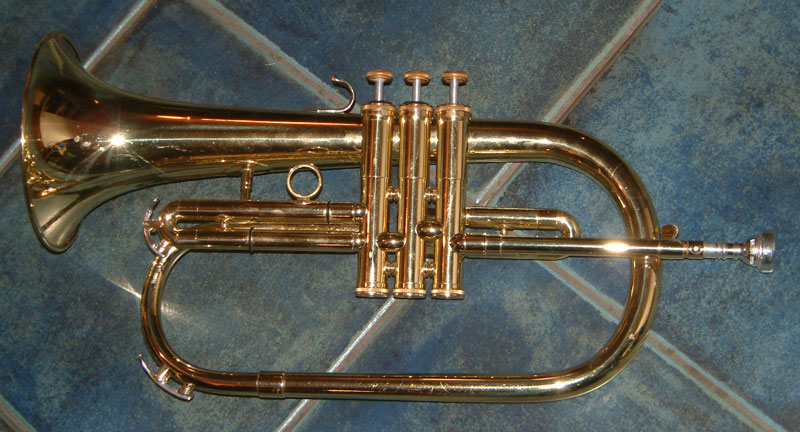
Flugelhorn

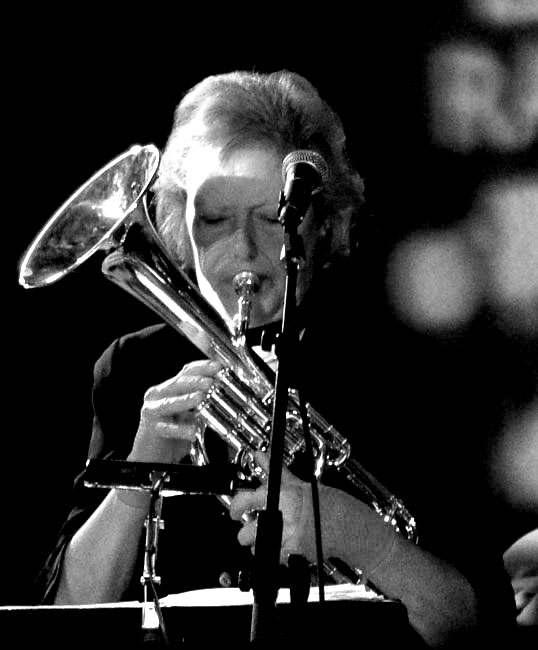
Tenor Horn

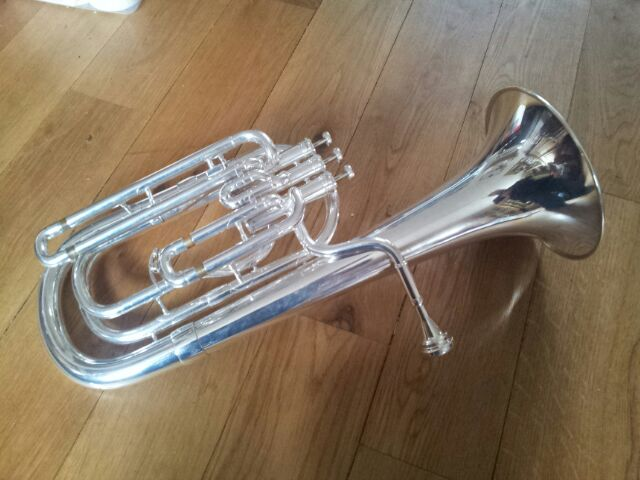
Baritone horn

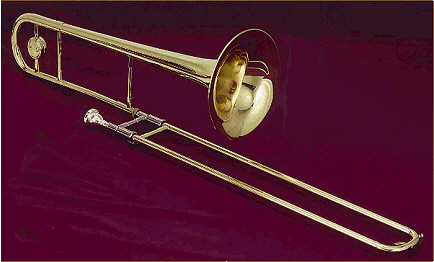
Tenor trombone

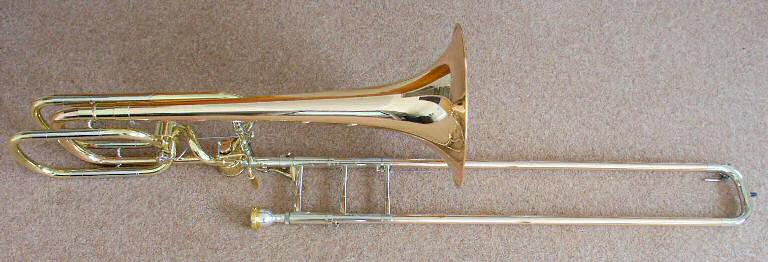
Bass trombone

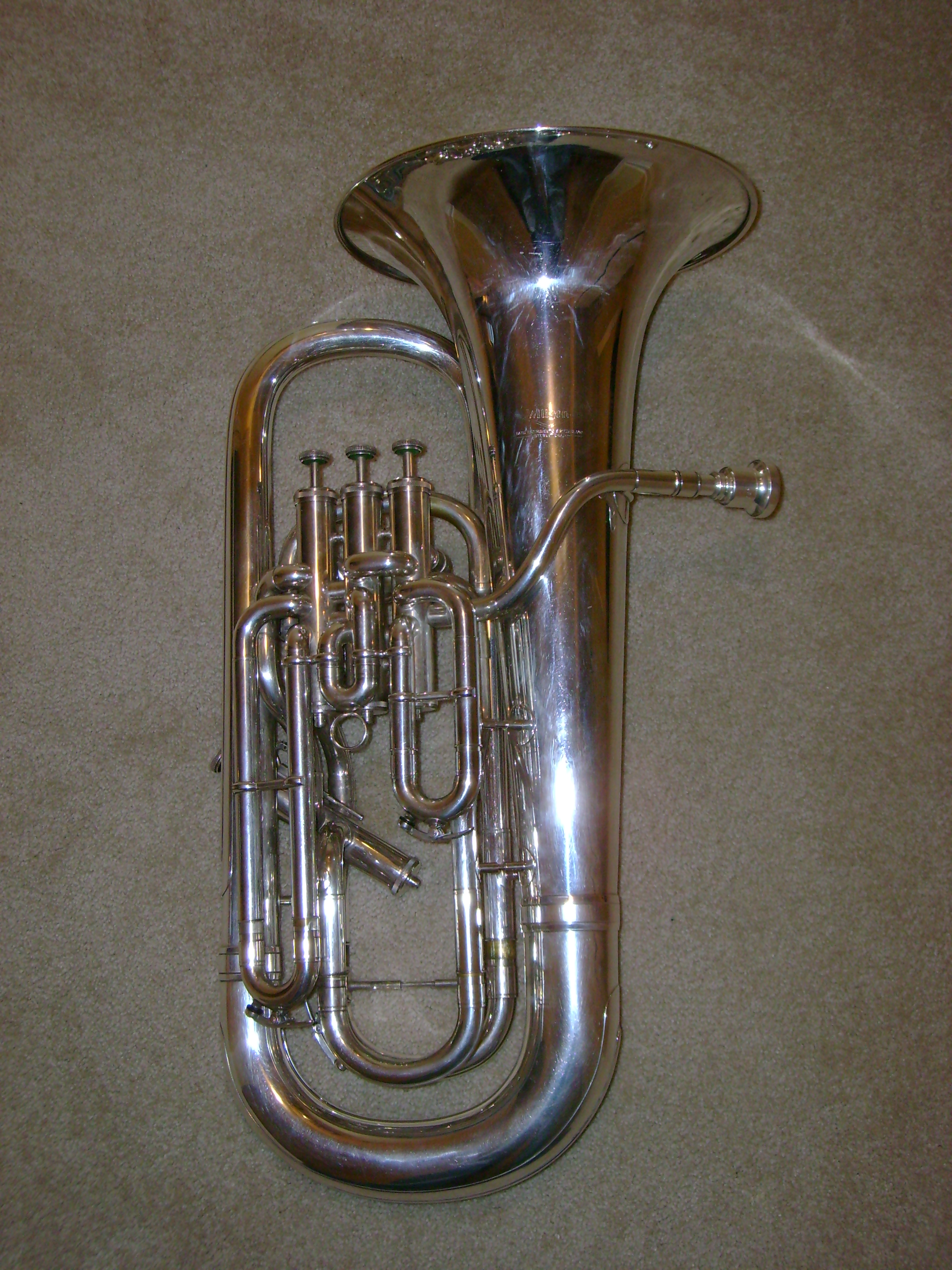
Euphonium

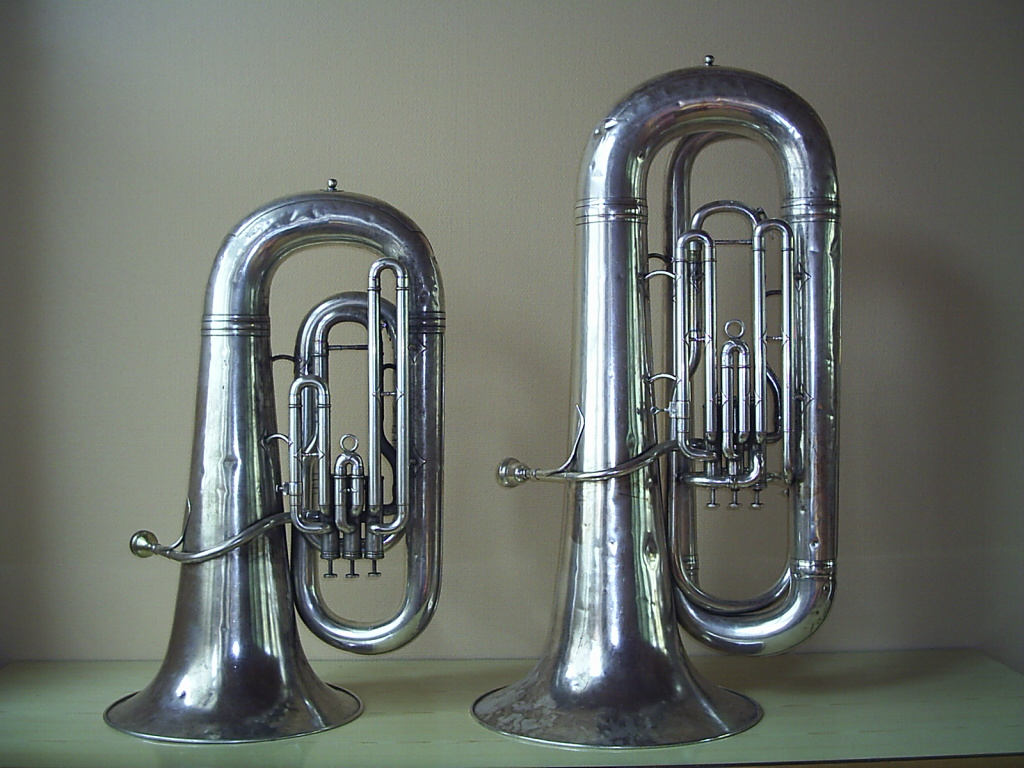
E♭ and B♭ Tubas

With the exception of three trombones, all of the instruments have a conical bore, which gives the British-style brass band its distinctive warm timbre compared to the bright fanfare sound of an ensemble of cylindrical bore instruments (trumpets and trombones). All parts apart from the bass trombone and percussion are notated in treble clef. Despite its musical range, the alto horn in E♭ is traditionally called the tenor horn in British bands.

Brass bands have a long tradition of competition between bands, often based around local industry and communities. British-style brass bands are widespread throughout Great Britain, former British colonies especially Australia and New Zealand, Norway, parts of continental Europe and North America. Annual competitions are held in these countries to select champion bands at various levels of musical competence.

The Salvation Army has deployed brass bands since 1878 and they continue to be an integral part of its church. The most well-known Salvation Army brass band is the London-based International Staff Band. Salvation Army bands vary considerably in size and complement as they are based on the local personnel available, some being as small as 6–8 members. The cornet section of a Salvation Army band does not include a "repiano" and instead of 2nd & 3rd cornets there are 1st & 2nd cornets. A Salvation Army band may have 3–6 tenor horns, 2–4 baritones and 2–6 tenor trombones. Salvation Army bands have a local tradition of training children in brass playing from an early age (starting at 7–8 years old). In larger Salvation Army churches there will often be a junior band for children (7–18 years old) as well as a senior band for adults.

=== Low Countries ===
Fanfare orchestras are a type of brass band mainly found in Belgium and the Netherlands, while several ensembles exist in Germany, France and Luxembourg. Unlike British bands, they also sport saxophones. There are fanfares affiliated to the military and civil fanfare orchestras which are an important element of cultural tradition in some areas.

In the second part of the 20th century, many British-style brass bands have been founded in the Low Countries as well, often as part of a musical association also including a fanfare orchestra or a concert band.

=== New Orleans ===
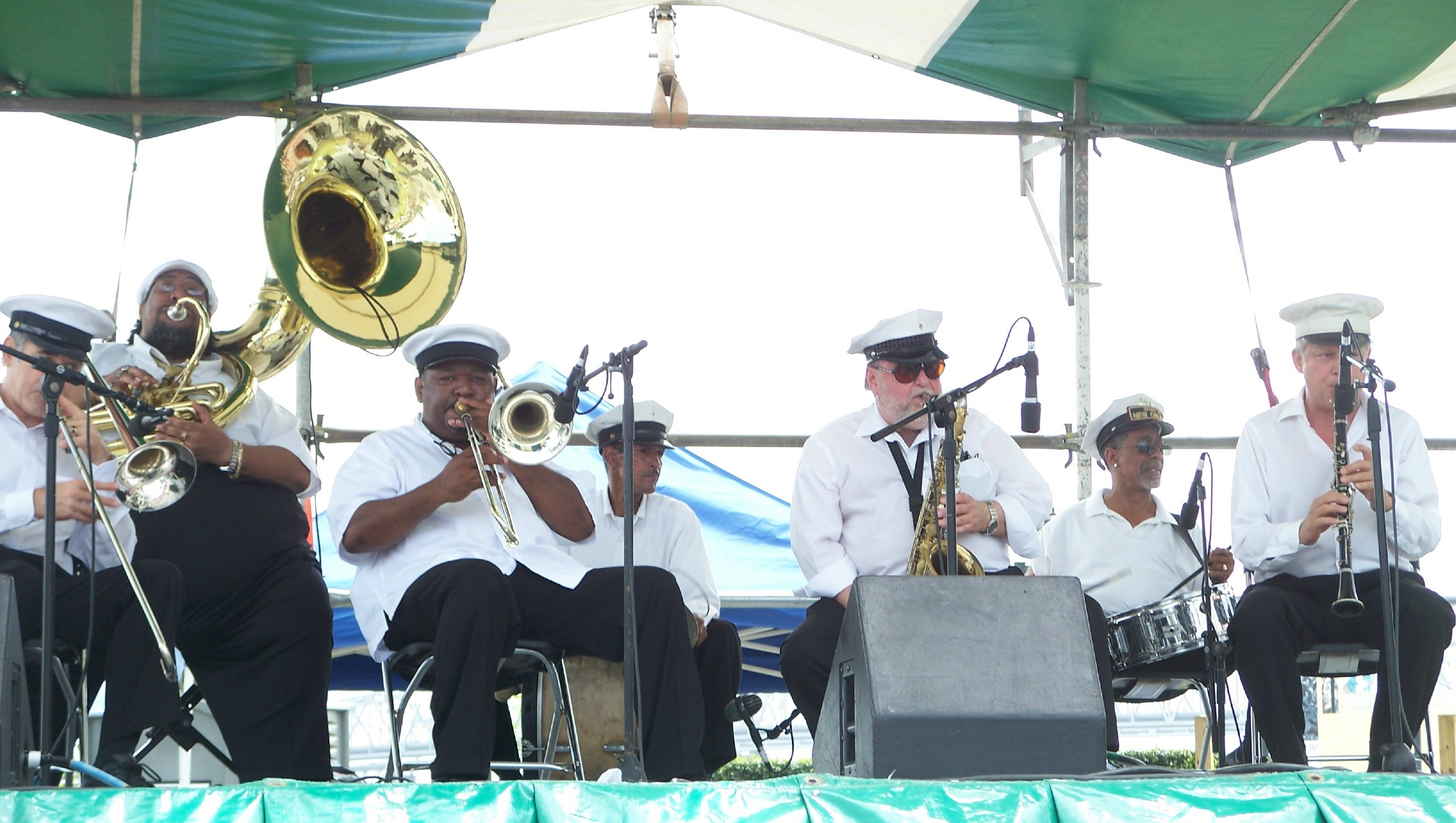
The Spirit of New Orleans Brass Band performs at the French Quarter Festival, New Orleans, Louisiana, 11 April 2008.

The tradition of brass bands in New Orleans, Louisiana dates to the late 19th and early 20th centuries. Traditionally, New Orleans brass bands could feature various instrumentations, often including trumpets, trombones, clarinets, saxophones, sousaphones, and percussion. The music played by these groups was often a fusion between European-styled military band music and African folk music brought to the Americas by West African slaves and the idiom played a significant role in the development of traditional jazz. Early brass bands include the Eureka Brass Band, the Onward Brass Band, Algiers Brass Band the Excelsior Brass Band, the Tuxedo Brass Band, the Young Tuxedo Brass Band, the Camelia Brass Band, and the Olympia Brass Band.

The Treme Brass Band, while not as old, has members who have been influential throughout New Orleans Brass Band music, as well as being renowned in its own right.

A well-known use of these bands is for the New Orleans jazz funeral and second line parades.

==== Hip-hop and funk ====
In the 1970s and 1980s, the New Orleans brass band tradition experienced a renaissance, with bands breaking away from traditional stylings and adding elements of funk, hip hop, and bop to their repertoires. Some notable exponents of this style of brass band, sometimes known as Brasspop or Urban Brass, include the band Def Generation, members of the next generation of Nevilles who created hip hop over live brass bands, influencing Soul Rebels Brass Band, Rebirth Brass Band, the Stooges Brass Band, the Hot 8 Brass Band, the Lil Rascals Brass Band, Youngblood Brass Band, The Original Pinettes Brass Band, the Dirty Dozen Brass Band and The Big 6 Brass Band. Also, a number of groups outside the United States have begun playing this style of music.

The style of the music is often characterized by the use of the sousaphone in place of a Double bass to play the bass-line. The sousaphone may play a traditional jazz walking bassline or groove on a riff. Trumpets, trombones, saxophones, and other horns play melodies and harmonies loosely over the bass-line. Often the lines are greatly embellished with improvisation. A typical setup includes two percussionists, one playing a marching bass drum and a cymbal mounted on the drum and another playing a snare drum (the snare drummer often switches to a drum kit when not marching). Many variations on this exist, including the use of additional percussionists, cymbals, drums, whistles and Scratch DJ's.

The style has moved beyond New Orleans and can now be found in such places as Japan with the Black Bottom Brass Band; Finland with TIMO Brass Band; Germany with Querbeat, LaBrassBanda, Moop Mama, MaddaBrasska, Meute or Brass Riot; Belgium with Brazzmatazz, the Netherlands with the Neutral Ground Brass Band, Happy Feet and the Hurricane brass bands; Scotland with the Criterion Brass Band; England with the Renegade Brass Band; Australia with the Horns of Leroy Brass Band; Phoenix, Arizona with the Bad Cactus Brass Band; Boston, Massachusetts with the Hot Tamale Brass Band; Hartford, CT with the Funky Dawgz Brass Band; Tennessee with Halfbrass; Minnesota with the Jack Brass Band and the Dirty Shorts Brass Band; Missouri with the Funky Butt Brass Band; Georgia with the Half Dozen Brass Band; Cincinnati, Ohio with The Cincy Brass; Madison, Wisconsin with the Mama Digdown's and Youngblood; Richmond, VA No BS! Brass brass bands; and Sacramento, California with Element Brass Band.

Although not a brass band by definition, the Chilean band Newen Afrobeat, founded in 2009, also has very strong brass and rhythm sections, but is more rooted in Afrobeat and jazz than hip-hop.

=== Polynesia ===
Founded in 1836 by King Kamehameha III, the Royal Hawaiian Band is the second oldest and only full-time municipal band in the United States. In recent generations, unique brass band traditions have also developed in Tonga, Samoa, and other parts of Polynesia, as well as among the Māori of New Zealand. Some recordings are now available and these styles are beginning to be researched and promoted abroad through band tours.

=== Zanzibar ===
Deriving from English 'band', Beni is a popular wedding entertainment with a strong focus on rhythm and dance, and audience participation. Beni originated in Zanzibar around the turn of the 20th century as a mockery of colonial style military bands.

In Zanzibar, Beni is performed both as a street parade and stationary as a wedding dance.

== Festivals and contests ==
One festival featuring brass bands is the Tarragona International Dixieland Festival, in Catalonia, Spain. The organisation programs not only dixieland brass bands but also ethnic or world music brass bands from over the world, including the Dirty Dozen Brass Band from the US, Boban Marković Orkestar from Serbia, the Jaipur Kawa Brass Band from India and Taraf Goulamas from Occitania France.

In the United States the Great American Brass Band Festival has been held annually in Danville, Kentucky for the past 30 years and is free for all. This event attracts brass band lovers from the U.S., Canada, and Europe. The Vintage Band Festival occurs in Northfield, Minnesota every three years.

The North American Brass Band Association sponsors an annual convention that provides member bands with the opportunity to compete in a contest format similar to those conducted in the United Kingdom and Europe. The contest is typically late March to early April every year.

In Boston, Seattle and Austin a series of festivals called HONK! bring together street brass bands (and other related ensembles) from the United States and Canada, and some bands from other parts of the world. The groups presented include Balkan Brass Bands, New Orleans brass bands, Political Action Bands, Klezmer, and "DIY" Alternative / Radical Community Bands.

In Europe, many Brass Band contests are held throughout the year most notably being the European Brass Band Contest held every year during spring. This is a week long festival with many contests held throughout.

== Lists ==
=== Brass bands ===
- Algiers Brass Band
- Besses o' th' Barn Band
- Bestwood Welfare Black Diamonds Brass Band
- Black Dyke Band
- Brass Band Buizingen
- Brighouse and Rastrick Brass Band
- Carlton Main Frickley Colliery Band
- Central Park Brass
- Chalk Farm Band of the Salvation Army
- City of Oxford Silver Band
- Cory Band
- Dublin Silver Band
- Eastern Iowa Brass Band
- Foden's Band
- Grimethorpe Colliery Band
- Helston Town Band
- Herb Alpert & the Tijuana Brass
- Hot 8 Brass Band
- Hungry March Band
- Hypnotic Brass Ensemble
- International Staff Band of the Salvation Army
- Kibworth Band
- LaBrassBanda
- Lanner and District Silver Band
- Leyland Band
- Maidenhead Citadel Band of the Salvation Army
- Mama Digdown's Brass Band
- Meute
- Moop Mama
- Querbeat
- Rebirth Brass Band
- Reg Vardy Band
- River City Brass Band
- Rockville Brass Band
- Rode Hall Silver Band
- Soul Rebels Brass Band
- Stooges Brass Band
- Tapton Youth Brass Band
- The Dirty Dozen Brass Band
- The Harrogate Band
- The Ohio State University Marching Band
- The Original Pinettes Brass Band
- To Be Continued Brass Band
- Treme Brass Band
- Vernon Building Society (Poynton) Brass Band
- Virtuosi GUS Band
- Wellington Brass Band
- Worcester Concert Brass
- Yorkshire Imperial Band
- Youngblood Brass Band

=== Brass band composers ===
- Alex Lithgow
- Edward Gregson
- Eric Ball
- Goff Richards
- Gordon Langford
- Frederik Magle
- Henry James Metcalfe
- Herb Alpert
- Ingebjørg Vilhelmsen
- Simon Dobson
- John Philip Sousa
- Martin Ellerby
- Meredith Willson
- Nigel Clarke
- Paul Lovatt-Cooper
- Peter Graham
- Philip Sparke
- Charles Trussell
- Philip Wilby
- Thierry Deleruyelle
- Kenneth Downie
