= Essence Festival of Culture =

Annual cultural festival

Essence Music Festival
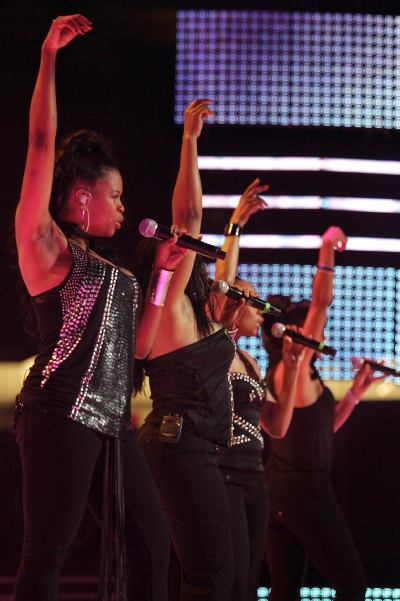
- En Vogue performing on the main stage at the 2009 Essence Music Festival.
- Genre: R&B • Soul • Funk • Gospel • Blues • Hip-Hop • Jazz • Afrobeats • Reggae • New jack swing
- Dates: July 4 weekend
- Locations: Caesars Superdome; New Orleans, Louisiana 1995-2005, 2007-2019, 2022-present NRG Stadium; Houston,Texas 2006 Virtually 2020-2021
- Years active: 1995-present
- Founders: Edward Lewis, George Wein
- Attendance: 500,000
- Website: Essence.com

The ESSENCE Festival of Culture is the largest African-American culture and music event in the United States. The New York Times called it "an important event in non-hip-hop black pop for an entire generation," citing its high-profile music stages, its panels and keynotes by leading community figures, and its annual turnout of over 500,000 attendees a day, among other offerings.

== History ==
The annual music festival started in 1995 in New Orleans, Louisiana, as the Essence Music Festival, to celebrate the 25th anniversary of Essence magazine and provide an event commemorating Black culture. The festival was founded by Essence magazine co-founder Edward Lewis and Festival Productions founder George Wein. It was originally intended to be a one-time event. With 142,000 attendees that year, the organizers decided for the festival to be an annual event.

In 2006, it was held in Houston, Texas, due to Hurricane Katrina's effect on New Orleans.

In 2016, a spinoff iteration of the festival was held in Durban, South Africa.

In 2013, Solomon Group became the producer of Essence Festival, and MSNBC broadcast the event live. MSNBC returned for the 2014 festival.

Much of the 2017 film Girls Trip was filmed on location during the 2016 festival, casting over 5,000 extras.

The 2020 festival was initially canceled due to the COVID-19 pandemic. In response, the 2020 and 2021 festivals were held virtually.

In 2022, The Walt Disney Company served as the exclusive entertainment sponsor.

== Controversies ==
In 2023, the festival faced criticism for filing a cease-and-desist against Baldwin & Co., a Black-owned bookstore in New Orleans, which had planned to host a book signing event amid the festival week. While the cease-and-desist was eventually dropped, The Lens reported "immediate backlash from the local Black literary and activist community" and called it "a revealing moment—a flashpoint that exposed the growing gap between Essence’s branding and its behavior."

In 2025, it faced criticism from festivalgoers who, according to Ebony, found numerous logistical issues with the festival's operations as well as an ideological shift away from a "Black American focus" and toward "more pan-African inclusion" which "left some feeling sidelined in a space historically cultivated by and for Black Americans, particularly descendants of slavery in the American South." Ebony also reported "xenophobia between Africans and Black Americans" in the post-festival discourse online. The Lens similarly pointed out "a shift—away from something rooted and spiritual, toward something packaged, curated, and increasingly corporate" and stated that the Essence Festival of Culture had an identity crisis.

== Concert line-up ==
=== 1995 ===
- Aaliyah
- Anita Baker
- Arethra Franklin
- B. B. King
- Boyz II Men
- Cornel West
- Frankie Beverly
- Gladys Knight
- Jesse Jackson
- Johnny Cochran
- Luther Vandross
- Mary J. Blige
- Maxine Waters
- Patti LaBelle
- The Isley Brothers (substituting for Barry White)
- The O'Jays (with Gerald Levert)

=== 1996 ===
- Al Green
- Barry White
- Cameo
- Etta James
- The Fugees
- Luther Vandross
- Patti LaBelle
- Peabo Bryson
- R. Kelly (cancelled)
- Maze

=== 1997 ===
- Ashford & Simpson
- Bobby Blue Bland
- Chris Rock
- Erykah Badu
- George Clinton & P-Funk
- Gladys Knight & the Pips
- The Isley Brothers
- Kenny G
- Kirk Franklin
- Maxwell
- Maze
- Morris Day & the Time
- New Edition (without Bobby Brown)
- The O'Jays

=== 1998 ===
- Brian McKnight
- D'Angelo
- The Emotions
- Frankie Beverly
- Grover Washington Jr.
- Jeffrey Osborne
- K-Ci and JoJo
- Kenny Lattimore
- LL Cool J
- LSG
- Luther Vandross
- Mary J. Blige
- Patti LaBelle
- The Stylistics
- Usher

=== 1999 ===
- Average White Band
- Brian McKnight
- Dru Hill
- Erykah Badu
- Etta James
- Lauryn Hill
- Maze
- Patti LaBelle
- R. Kelly
- The O'Jays
- The Temptations

=== 2000 ===
- Angie Stone
- Brian McKnight (substituting for Maxwell)
- Chaka Khan
- D'Angelo
- D.L. Hughley
- Earth, Wind & Fire
- Gladys Knight
- Luther Vandross
- Mary J. Blige
- Mint Condition (substituting for Sisqo)
- Run-DMC

=== 2001 ===
- Angie Stone
- Bilal
- Brenda Russell
- Carl Thomas
- Clarence Carter
- Destiny's Child
- Donald Harrison
- Eric Benét
- Erykah Badu
- Irma Thomas
- Jeffrey Osborne
- Jill Scott
- Joe
- Kelly Price
- Maze featuring Frankie Beverly
- Patti Austin
- Patti LaBelle
- Rebirth Brass Band
- Solomon Burke
- Steel Pulse
- Steve Harvey
- Teena Marie
- The Dells
- The O'Jays
- The Roots
- The Whispers
- Tower of Power
- Vintage
- Yolanda Adams
- Zion Golan

=== 2002 ===
- Al Green
- Alicia Keys
- Angie Stone
- Average White Band
- Babyface
- Big Al Carson
- Brian McKnight
- Cedric the Entertainer
- Denise LaSalle
- De La Soul
- Etta James
- Faith Evans
- Femi Kuti
- Friends
- Gerald Levert
- Glenn Lewis
- India.Arie
- Kindred the Family Soul
- King Floyd
- Luther Vandross
- Mary J. Blige
- Maze featuring Frankie Beverly
- Me'Shell Ndegeocello
- Mike Phillips
- Myself
- Oleta Adams
- Rahsaan Patterson
- Steve Harvey
- The Brothers Johnson
- The Isley Brothers featuring Ronald Isley
- The Ohio Players
- The Roots
- Tom Joyner & the Morning Show Crew
- Tyrone Davis

=== 2003 ===
- All-Star Tribute to Luther Vandross
- Anita Baker
- Ashanti
- Biz Markie
- Bobby "Blue" Bland
- Chaka Khan
- Chuck Brown & The Soul Searchers
- Dianne Reeves
- Doug E. Fresh
- Dwele
- Erykah Badu
- Faith Evans
- Gerald Levert
- Groove Theory
- Heather Headley
- Jaguar Wright
- Jaheim
- Jamie Foxx
- Keith Sweat
- Kelly Price
- Kindred the Family Soul
- LL Cool J
- Maze featuring Frankie Beverly
- Michael Franks
- Mo'Nique
- Musiq Soulchild
- Nappy Roots
- Patti LaBelle
- S.O.S. Band
- Smokey Robinson
- Stevie Wonder
- The Bushwhackers
- The Gap Band
- Third World
- Will Downing
- Yolanda Adams

=== 2004 ===
- 112
- Anthony Hamilton
- Chanté Moore
- Common
- Dazz Band
- Dionne Farris
- Donnie McClurkin
- Freddie Jackson
- Gladys Knight
- Irma Thomas
- Kem
- Kenny Lattimore
- Lalah Hathaway
- Ledisi
- Little Milton
- LL Cool J
- Mary J. Blige
- Maze featuring Frankie Beverly
- Millie Jackson
- Morris Day & The Time
- New Edition
- Ohio Players
- O'Jays
- Prince
- Rebirth Brass Band
- Sinbad
- Solomon Burke

=== 2005 ===
- Alicia Keys
- Aretha Franklin
- Black Eyed Peas
- Bobby Blue Bland
- Carl Thomas
- Destiny's Child
- Doug E. Fresh
- Fantasia
- Floetry
- Jamia
- Jeffrey Osborne
- John Legend
- Kanye West
- Lionel Richie
- Lyfe Jennings
- Maze featuring Frankie Beverly
- Me'Shell Ndegeocello
- Mint Condition
- Mo'Nique
- Regina Belle
- Ruben Studdard
- Slick Rick
- Talib Kweli
- Teena Marie
- Terrence Blanchard
- The Roots
- The Wailers
- Vivian Green

=== 2006 ===
- Bobby Brown performed alone and with New Edition
- Brand New Heavies
- Cedric the Entertainer
- Charlie Wilson
- Chris Brown Missed flight so did not perform.
- Doug E. Fresh
- Earth Wind & Fire
- Goapele
- Jaheim
- Jamie Foxx
- Keyshia Cole
- Kindred the Family Soul
- LL Cool J
- Loose Ends
- Mary J. Blige
- Maze featuring Frankie Beverly
- Michael Ward
- Mo'Nique
- Musiq Soulchild
- New Edition
- Rebirth Brass Band
- Slick Rick
- Steve Harvey
- Toni Braxton
- Yolanda Adams

Dres of Black Sheep (and some other rappers) turned up for impromptu performances during Doug E Fresh set.

Venue: Reliant Stadium in Houston, Texas

=== 2007 ===
- Angie Stone
- Anthony David
- B-Legit
- Barack Obama
- Beyoncé
- Chanté Moore
- Ciara
- Chris Brown
- Common
- Cupid
- Isley Brothers featuring Ronald Isley
- Jermaine Paul
- Kenny Lattimore
- Kelly Rowland
- Kindred the Family Soul
- LeVert
- Lionel Richie
- Ludacris
- Lyfe Jennings
- Mary J. Blige
- Maze featuring Frankie Beverly
- MC Lyte
- Mint Condition
- Najee
- Ne-Yo
- Nuttin' But Stringz
- Pieces Of A Dream
- Public Enemy
- Rachelle Ferrell
- Rahsaan Patterson
- Rebirth Brass Band
- Robin Thicke
- Roi Anthony
- Ruben Studdard
- Smokie Norful
- The O'Jays
- Slum Village
- Solange Knowles
- Steve Harvey
- Sunshine Anderson
- Vanessa Bell Armstrong

=== 2008 ===
- All Star Tribute To Patti LaBelle: A celebration of Patti LaBelle featuring original LaBelle members Sarah Dash and Nona Hendryx
- Kanye West
- Chris Brown
- Rihanna
- J. Holiday
- Peabo Bryson
- Angie Stone
- Mint Condition
- Grandmaster Flash
- Terence Blanchard
- Big Sam's Funky Nation
- Rebirth Brass Band
- Ledisi
- Chrisette Michele
- Ruby Amanfu
- Jill Scott
- LL Cool J
- Musiq
- Lyfe Jennings
- Solange
- Irvin Mayfield and the New Orleans Jazz Orchestra
- Marva Wright
- Cupid
- Karina
- Bamboula
- Kermit Ruffins' tribute to Louis Armstrong
- Maze featuring Frankie Beverly
- Mary J. Blige
- Chris Rock
- Keyshia Cole
- Morris Day & The Time
- Chrisette Michele
- Estelle
- Raheem DeVaughn
- Gil Scott-Heron
- Irma Thomas
- Preservation Hall Jazz Band's Gospel Revival
- Nicholas Payton
- Christian Scott

=== 2009 ===
- Beyoncé
- John Legend
- Ne-Yo
- Salt N Pepa
- Eric Benet
- Sharon Jones & The Dap-Kings
- Solange
- Sierra Leone Refugee All Stars
- Keri Hilson
- Marva Wright
- Big Sam’s Funky Nation
- Preservation Hall Jazz Band Revue
- Dwele
- Maxwell
- Anita Baker
- Robin Thicke
- Charlie Wilson
- Jazmine Sullivan
- Ledisi
- Janelle Monáe
- Zap Mama
- Irvin Mayfield
- Little Freddie King
- Maze featuring Frankie Beverly
- Lionel Richie
- Al Green
- Teena Marie
- En Vogue
- Raphael Saadiq
- Lalah Hathaway
- Melanie Fiona
- Ryan Leslie
- Blind Boys of Alabama
- The Knux
- Trombone Shorty and Orleans Ave All Stars
- Rebirth Brass Band
- Laura Izibor

=== 2010 ===
- Janet Jackson
- Charlie Wilson
- Raphael Saadiq
- Monica
- Chrisette Michele
- Irma Thomas
- Arrested Development
- Big Sam's Funky Nation
- Mary Mary
- Irvin Mayfield & The NOJO
- WAR
- Little Freddie King
- Alicia Keys
- Gladys Knight
- LL Cool J
- Keri Hilson
- Laura Izibor
- Sam & Ruby
- De La Soul
- Kermit Ruffins & The BBQ Swingers
- Mint Condition
- Joe
- Rebirth Brass Band
- Earth Wind & Fire
- Mary J. Blige
- Jill Scott
- Trey Songz
- Estelle
- Hot 8 Brass Band
- Lalah Hathaway
- Ivan Neville's Dumpstaphunk
- Ruben Studdard
- Melanie Fiona
- PJ Morton Band
- Soul Rebels Brass Band

=== 2011 ===
2011 EMF Logo

- Usher
- Charlie Wilson
- Jennifer Hudson
- Fantasia
- Boyz II Men
- Macy Gray
- Dwele
- Alexander O’Neal and Cherrelle
- Mint Condition
- Soul Rebels Brass Band
- Tank
- Miguel
- Mavis Staples
- Irma Thomas
- Kanye West
- Jill Scott
- Chaka Khan
- El Debarge
- Eric Benet
- Morris Day & The Time
- Stephanie Mills
- Naughty by Nature
- To Be Continued Brass Band
- Mary J. Blige
- New Edition
- Trey Songz
- Loose Ends
- Hal Linton
- George Clinton & Parliament Funkadelic
- Rebirth Brass Band
- Kelly Price
- Vanessa Bell Armstrong
- Trin-i-Tee 5:7
- Brian Courtney Wilson
- MC Lyte
- Doug E. Fresh
- Hot 8 Brass Band

=== 2012 ===
2012 EMF Logo

- Diggy Simmons
- OMG Girlz
- Coco Jones
- Square Off
- Charlie Wilson
- D'Angelo
- Trey Songz
- Keyshia Cole
- The Pointer Sisters
- Marsha Ambrosious
- Kindred & The Family Soul
- Vivian Green
- Stephanie Mills
- Gary Clark Jr.
- Rebirth Brass Band
- SWV
- Goapele
- Mary J. Blige
- Kevin Hart
- Ledisi
- Mary Mary
- Tank
- Eric Roberson
- Teedra Moses
- The Stylistics
- Robert Glasper
- Dru Hill
- Big Sam's Funky Nation
- Chaka Khan
- Aretha Franklin
- Anthony Hamilton
- Fantasia
- Kirk Franklin
- Syleena Johnson
- Faith Evans
- KeKe Wyatt
- Nicci Gilbert
- Melanie Fiona
- Carl Thomas
- Alex Boyd
- Eve
- Estelle
- Luke James
- Raheem DeVaughn
- Bridget Kelly

=== 2013 ===
- Beyoncé
- Brandy
- Maxwell
- New Edition
- Charlie Wilson
- Keyshia Cole
- St Beauty
- Daley
- LL Cool J
- Malu Music
- Maya Azucena
- PJ Morton
- Roman GianArthur
- TGT
- Trey Songz
- Alice Smith
- Bridget Kelly
- Deep Cotton
- Emeli Sandé
- F. Stokes
- Janelle Monáe
- Jill Scott
- Kourtney Heart
- Leela James
- Luke James
- Mia Borders
- Shamarr Allen and the Underdawgs
- Simphiwe Dana
- Anthony David
- Big Daddy Kane
- Bilal
- Blackstreet
- Chrisette Michelle
- Faith Evans
- Jody Watley
- Les Nubians
- Marsha Ambrosious
- Mint Condition
- Rachelle Ferrell
- Tamia
- Biz Markie
- Brass-A-Holics
- Carla Ferrell
- Cupid
- Doug E. Fresh
- Gina Brown
- Greta Prince
- Mike Swift
- Solange
- Stooges Brass Band
- Nephew Tommy
- Tweet
- Water Seed

=== 2014 ===
- Prince
- Nas
- Janelle Monáe
- Nile Rodgers
- Mary J. Blige
- Jill Scott
- The Roots
- Ledisi
- Tank
- Lionel Richie
- Charlie Wilson
- Erykah Badu
- Jazmine Sullivan
- Jesse Boykins III
- Tevin Campbell
- K. Michelle
- Tamar Braxton
- Trey Songz
- 112
- Alice Smith
- August Alsina
- Big Sam's Funky Nation
- Daley
- Day26
- Doug E. Fresh
- Elle Varner
- Estelle
- George Tandy, Jr.
- Greta Prince
- Jagged Edge
- Kelly Prince
- Kevin Ross
- King
- Kourtney Heart
- Leela James
- Liv Warfield
- Marsha Ambrosius
- Michelle Williams
- Naughty by Nature
- Raheem DeVaughn
- Robert Glasper
- Sebastian Mikael
- Sevyn Streeter
- Stephanie Mills
- SWV
- Tevin Campbell
- The Original Pinettes Brass Band

=== 2015 ===
- Usher
- Missy Elliott
- Kendrick Lamar
- Mary J. Blige
- Kevin Hart
- Erykah Badu
- Common
- Maze featuring Frankie Beverly
- Charlie Wilson
- India.Arie
- Kem
- Trey Songz
- Adrian Marcel
- AverySunshine
- Lecrae
- Doug E. Fresh
- Grapple
- Kelly Price
- Kindred Te Family Soul
- Luenell
- Nico & Vinz
- Slick Rick
- Beenie Man & The Zagga Zow Band
- Bilal
- Elle Varner
- Esperanza Spalding
- Emily's D+Evolution
- Kool Moe Dee
- Mali Music
- Mystical
- Raheem DeVaughn
- Sevyn Streeter
- Tank
- The Bangas
- Tonya Boyd-Cannon
- Trombone Shorty & Orleans Avenue
- Floetry
- Andra Day
- Dee-1
- Dumpstaphunk
- Eric Roberson
- Jeff Bradshaw
- Lianne La Havas
- Mase
- Robert Glasper
- SZA
- Tendra Moses
- Tweet

=== 2016 ===
Main Stage
Friday: Estelle, Faith Evans, Tyrese, Kenny "Babyface" Edmonds, New Edition, Maxwell
Saturday: Jeremih, Common, Charlie Wilson, Mariah Carey
Sunday: Andra Day, Ciara, Puff Daddy & The Family, Kendrick Lamar

Superlounges
Friday: Digable Planets, Daley, Eric Bellinger, Lion Babe, The Internet, Tweet, Estelle, Mali Music, V. Bozeman, Kelly Price, Zakes Bantwini, Sky Wanda
Saturday: Doug E. Fresh, Tink, Jidenna, Preservation Hall Jazz Band, St. Beauty, Lalah Hathaway
Judith Hill
Wizkid, Lady Leshurr
Sunday: MC Lyte, Dej Loaf, Cyril Neville, Leon Bridges, Kehlani, New Breed Brass Band, Robert Glasper, BJ the Chicago Kid, The Brand New Heavies, Little Simz

=== 2017 ===
- Diana Ross
- John Legend
- Mary J. Blige
- Chance the Rapper
- Solange
- Chaka Khan
- Jill Scott
- Master P
- Trombone Shorty & Orleans Avenue
- India.Arie
- Monica
- Jazmine Sullivan
- Mystikal
- Silkk the Shocker
- Mia X
- Rhonda Ross
- Ari Lennox
- BJ the Chicago Kid
- Daley
- Doug E. Fresh
- Elle Varner
- Emily Estefan
- Gallant
- Jhené Aiko
- June's Diary
- Kelly Price
- Lalah Hathaway
- Leela James
- Lizzo
- Michel'le
- Moses Sumney
- PJ
- PJ Morton
- Remy Ma
- Ro James
- Shaggy
- Sir the Baptist
- Teyana Taylor
- The Jones Girls featuring Shirley Jones
- Tweet
- Yuna
- Heels over Head (SA)
- Rafiya
- DAVE Everyseason
- Lydia Caesar
- Napoleon da Great
- Cymphonique Miller
- Yazz
- Xscape

=== 2018 ===
Main Stage
Friday: Doug E. Fresh with special guest Mia X, Ledisi, Miguel, Snoop Dogg, The Roots curation featuring Erykah Badu, Jill Scott and more Saturday: Doug E. Fresh with special guest V. Bozeman, Xscape, Queen Latifah presentsLadies First: with special guests Missy Elliott, Remy Ma, MC Lyte, Yo-Yo, Brandy, and more, Mary J. Blige
Sunday: Doug E. Fresh with special guest Ashanti, Teddy Riley New Jack Swing Experience: featuring Wreckx-N-Effect, Blackstreet with Dave Hollister, Guy, Kool Moe Dee, SWV and more. , Fantasia, Janet Jackson

Superlounges
Friday: Lloyd, H.E.R., Damien Escobar, Kelly Price, The Internet, Tweet, Estelle, Mali Music, V. Bozeman, Kelly Price, Zakes Bantwini, Sky Wanda
Saturday: Doug E. Fresh, Tink, Jidenna, Preservation Hall Jazz Band, St. Beauty, Lalah Hathaway
Judith Hill
Wizkid, Lady Leshurr
Sunday: MC Lyte, Dej Loaf, Cyril Neville, Leon Bridges, Kehlani, New Breed Brass Band, Robert Glasper, BJ the Chicago Kid, The Brand New Heavies, Little Simz

=== 2019 ===
- Al Sharpton
- Angela Rye
- Ari Lennox
- Ava DuVernay
- Beto O'Rourke
- Big Freedia
- Bill de Blasio
- Boris Kodjoe
- Cori Murray
- Cory Booker
- Da Brat
- Elizabeth Warren
- Erika Alexander
- Estelle
- Gayle King
- Ginuwine
- H.E.R.
- Ilhan Omar
- Jacquees
- Jermaine Dupri
- Kamala Harris
- LaToya Cantrell
- Ledisi
- Lil Jon
- Luke James
- Major
- Mario
- Mary J. Blige
- Maxine Waters
- Michael Bennet
- Michelle Obama
- Missy Elliott
- Musiq Soulchild
- Nas
- Nelly
- Nicole Ari Parker
- Normani
- Patti LaBelle
- Pete Buttigieg
- Pharrell Williams
- RBRM
- Sheila E
- Teddy Riley
- Terry Crews
- Teyana Taylor
- Timbaland
- Trina
- Tyler Perry
- Wyclef Jean
- Yolanda Adams

=== 2020 ===
- Amanda Black
- Andra Day
- Bell Biv Devoe
- Bruno Mars
- Burna Boy
- Common
- D-Nice
- Damian Marley
- Diamond Platnumz
- Doug E. Fresh
- Elephant Man
- Estelle
- India.Arie
- John Legend
- Ledisi
- Nas
- Patti LaBelle
- Raphael Saadiq
- Rapsody
- Sauti Sol
- Shaggy
- Swizz Beatz

=== 2021 ===
- Adrienne Bailon
- Amerie
- Angela Yee
- Big Freedia
- Case
- Carl Thomas
- D-Nice
- Davido
- DJ Khaled
- Jazmine Sullivan
- Jesseca Dupart
- Ha Sizzle
- KES
- Kirk Franklin
- Lucky Daye
- Mary J. Blige
- Michelle Williams
- Miss Lawrence
- Ne-Yo
- Sarah Jakes Roberts
- Shantrelle P. Lewis
- Supacent
- Tank
- Teedra Moses
- Tiana Major9
- Tracy G

=== 2022 ===
- Chloe x Halle
- Debbie Allen
- Isley Brothers
- Lucky Daye
- New Edition
- City Girls
- Ghostface Killah
- Janet Jackson
- Patti LaBelle
- Stephanie Mills
- Nicki Minaj
- Raekwon
- The Roots
- Jazmine Sullivan
- Tems
- Carl Thomas
- Summer Walker
- Ashanti
- Nas
- Method Man
- Lil Kim
- The Lox
- Mickey Guyton
- El DeBarge
- Wyclef Jean
- Lauryn Hill
- Doug E. Fresh
- Dru Hill

=== 2023 ===
- Ari Lennox
- Big Daddy Kane
- Doug E. Fresh
- EPMD
- KRS-One
- Jagged Edge
- Juvenile
- Lauryn Hill
- Megan Thee Stallion
- Missy Elliott
- Slick Rick
- Tems

=== 2024 ===
- Bryan “Birdman” Williams
- Raphael Saadiq
- The Roots
- Mickey Guyton
- Ari Lennox
- T-Pain
- Busta Rhymes
- Jacquees
- Janet Jackson
- Charlie Wilson
- Usher
- D-Nice
- The Roots & Friends
- Busta Rhymes
- TGT
- Ayra Starr
- Jacquees
- Big Boi
- Donell Jones
- Lloyd
- Victoria Monét
- SWV
- Tank and The Bangas
- Teedra Moses
- HaSizzle
- Dawn Richard
- Special Tribute to Frankie Beverly

with Special Guests

=== 2025 ===
- Boyz II Men
- Davido
- Maxwell
- Master P.
- Buju Banton
- Donell Jones
- GloRilla
- Keke Palmer
- Mimi Yeye
- The Isley Brothers
- Muni Long
- Nas
- Summer Walker
- “Essence Flowers” Jermaine Dupri Honors Quincy Jones

=== 2026 ===
- Brandy
- George Clinton and Parlament Funkadelic with Kim Burrell, Savion Glover, Big Boi - 50th Anniversary of the landing of the Mothership
- Cardi B
- Kehlani
- Latto
- Monica
- Patti LaBelle
- Doug E Fresh
- Public Enemy
- Babyface

== See also ==
- List of hip hop music festivals
- List of blues festivals
- Hip hop culture
