= Wood High School =

Wood High School may refer to:

- Archbishop Wood Catholic High School, Philadelphia, Pennsylvania
- Henry Wise Wood Senior High School, Calgary, Canada
- James Wood High School, Winchester, Virginia
- Nunnery Wood High School, Worcestershire, England
- Parrs Wood High School, East Didsbury, England
- Penn Wood High School, Lansdowne, Pennsylvania
- Waldo J. Wood Memorial Jr/Sr High School, Oakland City, Indiana
- Will C. Wood High School, Vacaville, California
