= Mama Digdown's Brass Band =

- Origin: Madison, Wisconsin
- Genres: Brass band New Orleans jazz Funk
- Years active: 1993–present

Mama Digdown's Brass Band is an eight-piece American brass band from Madison, Wisconsin.

== History ==
Mama Digdown's Brass Band was formed by two former University of Wisconsin-Madison music students, Erik Jacobson and Christopher "Roc" Ohly. The group played its first shows in Madison, Wisconsin in 1993, at the local Art Fair on the Square. They released four full-length albums over the next several years, and followed with the live album Delicious, recorded in Madison, in late 2002.

The group has done concert tours across the United States and Europe. Their 2006 live album Ascona was recorded at a Switzerland jazz festival. In December 2009 they released their fifth studio album, We Make 'Em Say Ooh, and followed up the album's release with shows during Mardi Gras season in New Orleans. They were planning to release an album of Michael Jackson arrangements entitled Brass Jackson in 2016, but the album is now scheduled for release in March 2026.

== Discography ==
- North of New Orleans (1996)
- Big Boy (1998)
- Slippery 7 (1999)
- Mama's House (2001)
- Delicious: Live at the King Club (2002)
- The Digdown Decade (2005)
- Ascona (2006)
- We Make 'Em Say Ooh (2009)
- Live (2012)
- Bootleg Series Vol. 1: Majestic Theater, Madison 1.7.17 (2017)
- Outstanding b/w Just the Two of Us (2020)
- Bootleg Series Vol. 2: Live at the Green Mill 2005 (2021)
- Brass Jackson (2026)

== Members ==
Current

- Erik Jacobson - Sousaphone / Leader
- Christopher 'Roc' Ohly - Saxophone / Leader
- Jeff 'K-Town' Maddern - Trumpet
- Ben 'Kid' Bell Bern - Trumpet
- Charlie Palm - trumpet
- Jordan Cohen - Snare Drum
- Yorel Lashley - Bass Drum
- Matt Hanzelka - Trombone
- Darren Sterud - Trombone
- Nat Macintosh - Trombone

Former

- Derek Wright - Bass Drum, Percussion, Producer
- Dave Skogen - Snare Drum
- Mike Boman - trumpet
- Steve Rogness - trombone
- Nick Bartell - saxophone
- Evan 'Basic Sam' Morgan - snare drum
- Moses Patrou - bass drum
- Tom Leith - bas drum
- Scott Campbell - saxophone
- Ben Mcintosh - trombone
- Michael Hanson
