= Diva By Cindy =

US haircare brand

- Product type: Hair care
- Country: United States of America
- Introduced: 2007
- Website: www.divabycindy.com

Diva by Cindy is an African-American and Woman owned brand of all natural hair care products. The company is based in Baltimore, Maryland, and is known for producing conditioners, lotions, shampoos, and hairgels.

== History ==
The company was founded in 2007 by Cindy Tawiah, a member of a family of Ghanaian diplomats. Tawiah studied chemistry in Ghana before immigrating to the United States in 1993 and becoming a nurse at Bon Secours Hospital in Baltimore.

In 2004, Tawiah started her own salon, Shades of U, before launching a hair care brand named Diva By Cindy in 2007. Many of Diva By Cindy's products were designed for women suffering from conditions such as alopecia, stress and thyroid issues.

Tawiah began by marketing Diva By Cindy to salons, before expanding to retail stores. Diva By Cindy found further success in retail, and was featured on television programmes such as the Tom Joyner Morning Show and WBFF.

After being sold in retail stores and airports, Diva By Cindy launched the first series of natural hair care vending machines in 2019. The first of these vending machine was installed in BWI airport.

Diva By Cindy partnered with Sally Beauty Holdings in 2020 for retail distribution.

=== The Diva Project ===
In 2004, Cindy Tawiah started a program called the Diva Project to support homeless women and victims of domestic violence. Proceeds from the sale of Diva By Cindy have gone to providing wellness services, counselling and meals to women who were victims of domestic violence and abuse.

== See also ==
- Shea Moisture
- Carol's Daughter
- African-American businesses
- Natural hair movement
