= Stooges Brass Band =

New Orleans brass band

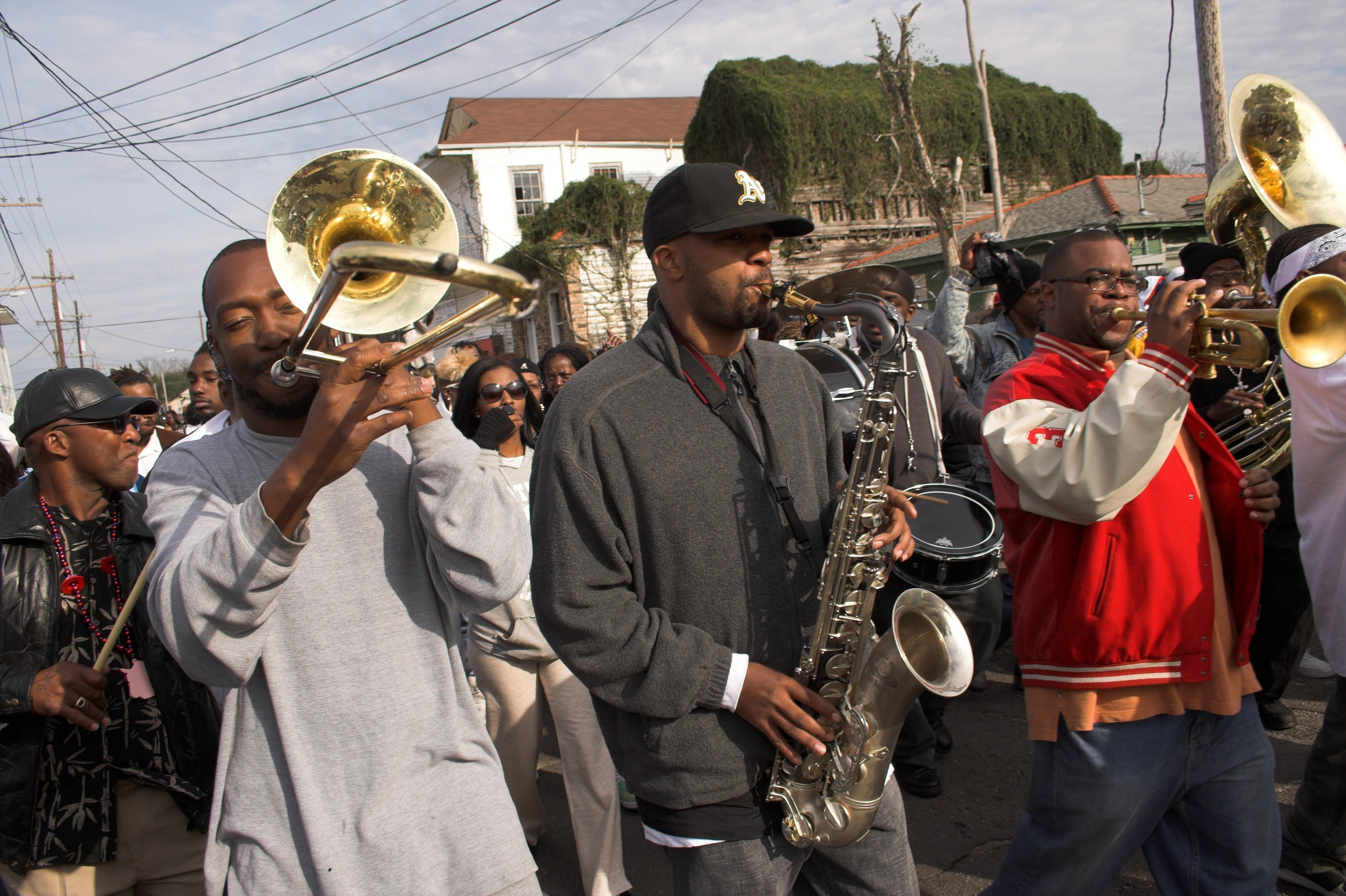
- The Stooges Brass Band playing for the Lady Jetsetters second line in 2009. From left to right, Alfred Growe (trombone), Virgil Tiller (tenor sax), and Drew Baham (trumpet). Photo by Derek Bridges.

Background information
- Also known as: Stooges Music Group
- Origin: New Orleans, Louisiana
- Genres: Hip Hop, Funk, Brass Band, New Orleans R&B, Second Line, Soul, Jam band, Jazz
- Years active: 1996–present
- Members: Walter Ramsey (bandleader, trombone, tuba); Alfred Growe (trombone); Ersel "Garfield" Bogan (trombone); Drew Baham (trumpet); Virgil Tiller (tenor saxophone); Clifton "Spug" Smith (tuba); Glenn Preston (trumpet); Eric "Bogie" Gordon (trumpet); John Perkins (trumpet); Cameron Johnson (saxophone); Roland Taylor (drums); Mike Jones (keyboards); Javan Carter (trumpet/tuba); Elliot Slater (guitar); Thaddeaus "Peanut" Ramsey (bass drum); Maurice "Sporty" Craig (trombone); Antoine "Ace Free" Coleman (snare); Bryant Gair (trumpet); Dorian Jones (bass drum); Que'Dyn Growe (snare); Errol Marchand (snare)
- Past members: Trombone Shorty (trumpet); Big Sam (musician) (trombone); Arian Macklin (tuba); Wayne Lewis (saxophone); Big Al Huntley (trumpet); Big Sam Williams (trombone); Sammy Cyrus (snare); Ellis Joseph (bass drum); John Cannon (tuba); Chad Honore (trumpet); J'mar "Buzz" Westley (snare); Brian Gerdes (trumpet); Dwayne Williams (bass drum); Chris Cotton (trumpet); Herbert Davis (tuba); Jamelle Williams (trumpet); Wendell “Cliff” Stewart; Edward Lee (tuba); Erion Williams (saxophone); Lamar Heard (trombone); Travis Carter (tuba); Floyd Gray (bass drum); Larry Brown (trombone); Arnold Little (saxophone); Andrew McGowan (keyboards)
- Website: www.stoogesbrassband.com

The Stooges Brass Band is a New Orleans, Louisiana, brass band. The group was formed in 1996 after band leader Walter Ramsey saw a performance by the Rebirth Brass Band. The Stooges Brass Band is known for incorporating elements of hip hop, funk and R&B into a more traditional brass band framework. The band has played the Bonnaroo Music & Arts Festival, the New Orleans Jazz & Heritage Festival, High Sierra Music Festival, and South by Southwest. In 2012, they were selected by the U.S. State Department to tour Pakistan, and became the first American band to play in Hyderabad.

== Biography ==
The Stooges Brass Band started in 1996 when band leader Walter Ramsey combined members of two rival high school marching bands. After seeing the Rebirth Brass Band play, Ramsey was inspired to experiment with merging hip hop, funk, and R & B, influences into a traditional New Orleans brass band framework. The band name evolved out of their stage antics, when one of the band members referred to the rest as “a bunch of stooges.” Early members included Trombone Shorty, ’Big’ Sam Williams, Drew Baham, Ellis Joseph, Sammy Cyrus, and Dwayne Williams.

Over the next decade, the Stooges Brass Band gained a reputation in local clubs and second line parades. Early successes included recording with Jessica Simpson, and production work for ESPN.

=== Red Bull Street Kings competition ===
In October 2010, the Stooges Brass Band won the Red Bull Street Kings competition. The event featured four prominent brass bands in an elimination-style competition. Red Bull flew the band out to their L.A. studios to record an EP and video music series with hip hop producer Mannie Fresh. The event was covered by the Documentary Channel, who released a documentary in 2011.

=== Touring ===
In April 2011, the Stooges Brass Band won the Best Contemporary Brass Band award from the Big Easy Music Awards. The band began touring more aggressively in 2012, playing Bonnaroo Music & Arts Festival, the New Orleans Jazz & Heritage Festival, Edinburgh Jazz Festival, High Sierra Music Festival, Essence Music Festival, Lincoln Center Out Of Doors Series, South by Southwest, and others. In June 2012, the band was selected by the U.S. State Department to serve as cultural ambassadors on a tour to Pakistan. They performed in Lahore, Islamabad, Karachi, and Hyderabad.

=== Can't Be Faded ===
In 2020, the Stooges became the first brass band in New Orleans to author a book with the release of Can’t Be Faded: Twenty Years in the New Orleans Brass Band Game, published by the University Press of Mississippi. Co-authored with Canadian music scholar Kyle DeCoste, the book chronicles the careers of sixteen past and present band members and documents the city’s brass band scene at the turn of the twenty-first century.

== Discography ==
=== It’s About Time (2003) ===
No.	Title	Length
1.	"Intro"	0:57
2.	"Stooges Party"	7:02
3.	"Deal With This"	4:14
4.	"Where Ya From"	5:12
5.	"Old Man"	4:40
6.	"Can't Be Faded"	4:01
7.	"Wind It Up"	5:57
8.	"Chosen II (Bonus Track)"	2:30
9.	"Mo 1"	4:25
10.	"This Is The Time"	4:03
11.	"New Funk"	4:31
12.	"Come And Dance With Me"	4:50
13.	"Bin Laden"	6:24
14.	"Paul Barbarin"	3:54
15.	"Weed Drought"	6:46

=== Street Music (vinyl only release, 2013) ===
Side A
No.	Title	Length
1.	"Why They Had to Kill Him"	6:52
2.	"Stooges Reunion"	4:58
3.	"Can You Hear Me Now"	6:32

Side B
No.	Title	Length
4.	"Oh No"	6:15
5.	"I Need You"	4:48
6.	"I Gotta Eat"	6:11

=== Thursday Night House Party (2016) ===
No.	Title	Length
1.	"Star Spangled Banner"	1:51
2.	"Thursday Night House Party"	6:41
3.	"Where Ya From, Pt. 2"	7:24
4.	"Oh No"	6:30
5.	"Good Livin'"	5:42
6.	"Amazing Grace"	4:02
7.	"Don't Hate the Groove"	5:52
8.	"Doin' My Job"	6:13
9.	"Spain"	5:54
10.	"Make 'em Say Ooh"	8:53
11.	"Why"	12:07
