= Essence (magazine) =

US magazine for Black American women

- Musician Jill Scott on the cover of the May 2010 issue of Essence
- Frequency: 6 issues annually
- Total circulation: 756,800 (2024)
- First issue: May 1970; 56 years ago
- Company: Essence Communications (Essence Ventures)
- Country: United States
- Based in: New York City, New York, U.S.
- Website: essence.com
- ISSN: 0014-0880

Essence (stylized in all caps) is an American monthly lifestyle magazine covering fashion, beauty, entertainment, and culture. First published in 1970, the magazine is written for Black American women.

The magazine has also published several books including A Salute to Michelle Obama, a tribute to the country's first African-American First Lady.

== History ==
Edward Lewis, Clarence O. Smith, Cecil Hollingsworth and Jonathan Blount founded Essence Communications Inc. (ECI) in 1968. It began publishing Essence magazine in May 1970. Lewis and Smith called the publication a "lifestyle magazine directed at upscale African American women". They recognized that black women were an overlooked demographic and saw Essence as an opportunity to capitalize on a virtually untouched market of black women readers. Its initial circulation was approximately 50,000 copies per month, subsequently growing to roughly 1.6 million. Gordon Parks served as its editorial director during the first three years of its circulation.

In 2000, Time Inc. purchased 49 percent of Essence Communications Inc.

In 2005, Time Inc. made a deal with Essence Communications Inc. to purchase the remaining 51 percent. The deal placed the ownership of the 34-year-old Essence magazine, one of the United States' leading magazines for Black women, under widespread ownership, rather than black ownership. In January 2018, the magazine returned to a fully black-owned publication after its acquisition by Richelieu Dennis, the Liberian American founder of Sundial Brands.

In 2020, Black Female Anonymous, a group made up of former and possibly current Essence employees, published a Medium article alleging sexual harassment claims against Dennis, as well as egregious claims of bullying and mistreatment of employees by members of the C-Suite. Following the Medium post, an investigation was launched into the claims.

As a result of the Coronavirus pandemic, Essence furloughed staff in 2020 after receiving a PPP loan from the government.

== Contents ==
In "Black Womanhood: Essence and its Treatment of Stereotypical Images of Black Women," professors stated that diverse images of black women are not often included in white magazines and media but that those black women can see themselves in different lights in Essence. The magazine features sections called Celebrity, Fashion, Beauty, Hair, Love, and Point-of-View. The magazine has covered topics from family, to social issues in the Black community, Black women in the military, and being HIV positive. Celebrities including Michelle Obama and the late Whitney Houston have appeared on the cover and been featured in the magazine through interviews and photo spreads. Originally launched primarily as a fashion magazine, Essence has grown to be a guideline for Black Women in many aspects of life.

=== Format ===
The online version of the magazine opens with large images that also display links to main articles. Scrolling farther the down, viewers of the site will find "Top Stories", "Hot Right Now", and other sections. There are tabs to the various categories of the publication's material, including "Celebrity," "Fashion," "Beauty," "Hair," "Love," "Lifestyle," "News", and "Videos".

Several spots on the website provide links to the magazine's social media platforms, including Facebook, Twitter, Pinterest, YouTube, Instagram, and Google Plus. The bottom of the page presents a "From the Mag" section that features content from the magazine.

=== Imagery in advertisements ===
Essence issues in the early 2000s featured mostly black woman models with lighter skin complexions. The magazine then began to include a greater number of models with darker skin complexions.

In terms of hair types, long and wavy hairstyles were almost equally represented as short and curly styles. The sizes of the noses and lips of most of the models were considered average. The bodies of the models were not often displayed. When they were, thinner and average body types were more likely to be shown than fuller body types.

These observations rose out of a study titled "Race and Gender in the Media: A Content Analysis of Advertisements in Two Mainstream Black Magazines." They were then used to comment on what the image practices of Essence may say about how black media represents black people, chiefly black women, and how these representations may reflect and reveal larger truths about how black people themselves.

== Circulation ==
- Rate base: 1,600,000
- Subscriptions: 78%
- Single-copy sales: 22%

== Essence Music Festival ==
The Essence Music Festival is the nation's largest annual gathering of African-American musical talent, and has been going on annually since 1994 in New Orleans, bringing more than 400,000 people. The festival is a three-day event, that includes cultural celebrations, empowerment seminars, and nights of musical performances. Awards honoring prominent musicians in the African-American community are celebrated during the festival as well. The festival is held every Fourth of July weekend, and has featured some of the biggest names in music, including Prince, Beyoncé, Patti LaBelle, Mary J. Blige, Lionel Richie and others.

In 2007, presidential candidates Barack Obama and Hillary Clinton made special appearances at The Essence Music Festival, and in 2009 the festival was held in honor of Barack Obama's inauguration and presidency, with Beyoncé as the headliner. In 2008, after partnering with Essence to develop and tape a co-branded special presentation Black in America: Reclaiming the Dream, CNN reported live on-site throughout the Music Festival weekend.

In 2013, the Essence Music Festival rebranded to the Essence Festival to showcase the event as more than a music festival.

In 2016, the first ever associate event to the Essence Festival was announced – Essence Festival Durban – set to take place in Durban, South Africa on November 8–13. Essence President Michelle Ebanks commented at the time, "This is a milestone year for the Essence brand as we get ready to bring one of our most beloved events to the heart of South Africa in the coastal city of Durban which represents an exciting mix of cultures. This inaugural Essence Festival Durban will bring together voices of influence and power from the continent of Africa, the U.S. and across the globe to connect communities and empower women spanning the diaspora."

- 2017

== Activism ==
In January 2005 Essence launched a 12-month initiative to combat misogyny in hip-hop culture. The campaign, titled "Take Back the Music", was intended to inspire public dialogue about the portrayal of black women in rap music. Essence also holds a Young Women's Leadership Conference since 2009, and released a book, also in 2009, titled Essence Presents: The Black Woman's Guide to Healthy Living.

== Awards ==
=== Awards run by Essence ===
==== Black Women In Hollywood Awards ====
This long-running award event, held each February on the Thursday before the Oscars, began in 2008 and continues to this day. His ceremony annually honors black women who have achieved success in Hollywood.

In the event's first decade, awards were presented in several categories. Beginning in 2017, the event had a single theme and individuals were honored, with no specific award titles.

===== 2008 =====
- Power Award: Jada Pinkett Smith

===== 2009 =====
- Legend Award: Diahann Carroll
- Power Award: Halle Berry
- Star to Watch Award: Taraji P. Henson
- Visionary Award: Gina Prince-Bythewood

===== 2010 =====
- Breakthrough Performance Award: Gabourey Sidibe
- Legend Award: Cicely Tyson
- Power Award: Queen Latifah
- Songstress of the Year: Mary J. Blige
- Star to Watch Award: Zoe Saldaña

===== 2011 =====
- Viola Davis
- Loretta Devine
- Angela Bassett
- Jennifer Hudson

===== 2012 =====
- Breakthrough Performance Award: Octavia Spencer
- Legend Award: Pam Grier
- Shining Star Award: Paula Patton
- Vanguard Award: Kerry Washington
- Visionary Award: Shonda Rimes

===== 2013 =====
- Breakthrough Performance Award: Quvenzhané Wallis
- Power Award: Oprah Winfrey
- Shining Star Award: Naomie Harris
- Alfre Woodard

===== 2014 =====
- Breakthrough Performance Award: Lupita Nyong'o
- Trailblazer Award: Cheryl Boone Isaacs
- Visionary Award: Ava DuVernay

===== 2015 =====
- Breakthrough Performance Award: Gugu Mbatha-Raw
- Fierce and Fearless Award: Regina King
- Visionary Award: Ruth E. Carter

===== 2016 =====
- Fierce and Fearless Award: Tracee Ellis Ross
- Power Award: Nina Shaw
- Legend Award: Debbie Allen

===== 2018 =====
- Honorees: Tiffany Haddish, Lena Waithe, Danai Gurira, Tessa Thompson

===== 2019 =====
- Theme: The Power of our Presence: Art and Activism
- Honorees: Amandla Stenberg, Jenifer Lewis, KiKi Layne, Regina Hall

===== 2020 =====
- Honorees: Niecy Nash, Melina Matsoukas, Lashana Lynch, and the cast of Pose, along with its executive producer Janet Mock

==== Essence Literary Awards ====
The first and only Essence Literary Awards ceremony was held in New York City on February 7, 2008, to celebrate both emerging and established African-American authors in nine categories: Fiction, Memoir, Inspiration, Non-fiction, Current Affairs, Photography, Children's Books, Poetry and Storyteller of the Year. The honorees were as follows:

- Children's Books: Marvelous World by Troy Cle/Simon & Schuster's Children's Publishing
- Current Affairs: An Unbroken Agony by Randall Robinson/ Basic Civitas
- Fiction: The Pirate's Daughter by Margaret Cezair-Thompson/Unbridled Books
- Inspiration: Quiet Strength by Tony Dungy/Tyndale
- Lifetime Achievement: Terry McMillan
- Memoir: Brother, I'm Dying by Edwidge Danticat/Knopf
- Non-fiction: Supreme Discomfort by Michael Fletcher and Kevin Merida/Doubleday
- Poetry: Duende by Tracy K. Smith/Graywolf Press
- Photography: Daufuskie Island by Jeanne Moutoussamy-Ashe/University of South Carolina Press
- President's Award: Reposition Yourself by T.D. Jakes/Atria
- Storyteller of the Year: L.A. Banks
- Save Our Libraries: Countee Cullen Regional Library in Harlem

=== Awards received by Essence ===
- 1970: National Magazine Award for Fiction for Hortense Spillers' "Isom"
- 2008: AdAge American Magazine Vanguard Award for "magazines that are innovating smartly beyond print."
- 2008: 12 New York Association of Black Journalists awards in the Investigative, General Feature, International, Business/Technology, Science/Health, Arts and Entertainment, Personal Commentary, Public Affairs and Online categories.
- NABJ Magazine Specialty Award – This award was received for their two part series "The Story of AIDS in Black America"
- NABJ Magazine Award for Business – This award was received for their Essence Home Ownership Campaign.
- 2010: NABJ Award for Investigative writing for Angela Burt-Murray, Jeannine Amber, Rosemarie Robotham's "Lost Girl"; Single Topic Series for "Realizing the Dream"

== Controversy ==
The 2005 purchase of Essence Communications Inc. marked the first time an African-American magazine would be owned by a white man, sparking controversy because of the company's 34 years under African-American ownership.

In the 2000s, Essence attracted controversy when the magazine hired white staffers including a fashion editor and later a managing editor in charge of production, a white male named Michael Bullerdick. Bullerdick parted ways with the magazine after politically conservative views that ran counter to Essence's mission, were found on his private Facebook page.

In July 2020, controversy rose again when anonymous magazine staffers alleged mistreatment and abuse under the leadership of Richelieu Dennis. In a post called "Black Female Anonymous" on Medium, it is alleged that senior staffers subjected black female employees to sexual harassment, pay inequity and bullying. Dennis subsequently stepped down and named Caroline Wanga as interim CEO.

== Editors ==
- Ida E. Lewis (1970–1971)
- Ruth Ross (1975)
- Marcia Ann Gillespie (1971–1980)
- https://www.thehistorymakers.org/biography/daryl-royster-alexanderDaryl Royster Alexander (1980-1981)
- Susan L. Taylor (1981–2000)
- Monique Greenwood (2000)
- Diane Weathers (2000–2005)
- Angela Burt-Murray (2005–2010)
- Sheryl Hilliard Tucker (2010–2011)
- Constance C. R. White (2011–2013)
- Vanessa K. De Luca (2013–2018)
- Danielle Cadet (2022 – present)
