= Worcester Concert Brass =

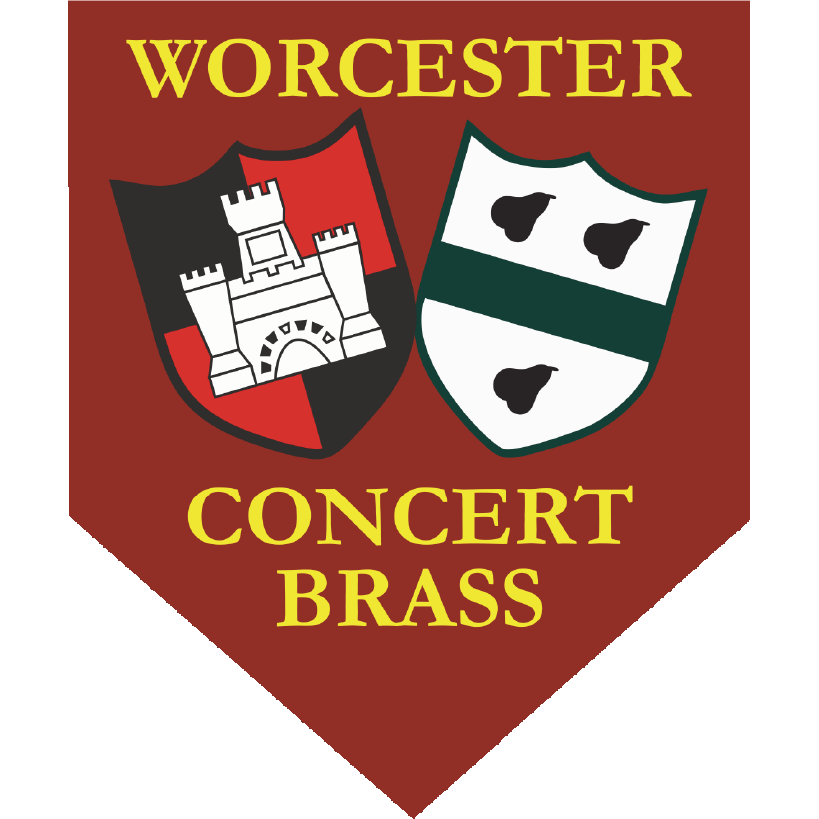
Worcester Concert Brass Logo

== A Brief History ==
The band was formed in March 1982 as the Nunnery Wood Youth Band by a group of local parents and staff from Nunnery Wood High School. Its aim was to give young people who had played in bands while at school an opportunity to continue playing in a brass band after they had left. Its members were originally drawn from staff, pupils and ex-pupils of a number of schools around the city and its musical director was Mr Tony White (Head of Music at Nunnery Wood High School).

A change in musical director in September 1992 to Mr Roy Turner (Brass Teacher - Worcester Royal Grammar School) and a reduction in the number of pupils being taught brass instruments in schools forced the band to look for more mature members and so a change of name was felt more appropriate and the band became Worcester Concert Brass in September 1993.

From its inception, the band had relied on its performing income and a number of grants from the Worcester Arts Council and other local charities to buy music and a small number of instruments. A membership fee (£50 Adult & £25 Junior) was introduced in September 1993 to make the band more viable and enable it to purchase instruments that would help to improve the performance standard and ensure the long-term stability of the band.

Worcester Concert Brass is supported by the National Lottery through the Arts Council of England and was given a grant of £47,000 in 1997. It has spent £56,800 since 1994 on new equipment and instruments.
