= Durango Blues Train =

Live blues music event in Durango, Colorado

- Genre: Blues
- Location: Durango, Colorado
- Years active: 2011 to present
- Founders: SBG Productions
- Website: http://www.durangobluestrain.com/

Durango Blues Train is a blues genre live music event in Durango, Colorado on a train on the Durango & Silverton Narrow Gauge Railroad. It takes place annually over two weekends at the end of the summer.

== Guests ==
The August 2017 lineup featured Hector Anchondo Band, Kerry Pastine and the Crime Scene, Brody Buster, Felonius Smith Trio, Husky Burnette, Caroline Crews, and Steve Itterly.

The June 2015 line-up featured Ben Miller Band, Moreland & Arbuckle, Eagle Eye Williamson, Cary Morin, The Bones of J.R. Jones, and Brian Keith Wallen.

The May 2015 lineup featured Dragondeer, Dan Treanor's Afrosippi Band with Erica Brown and MJ, Cary Morin, A.J. Fullerton featuring Big John Shrader, Grant Sabin, and Mark "Porkchop" Holder. The August 2015 lineup featured Mark May Band, The King Stan Band, Possessed By Paul James, Charlie Parr, Reverend Deadeye, and Big Jim Adam.

In 2014, the event featured Big Sam's Funky Nation, Todd & The Fox, Robby Overfield, The Bottoms Up Blues Gang, Eddie Turner, C.W. Ayon, Johnny Long, Chris Dracup, Gino Matteo, Matthew Curry and the Fury, Alex Maryol, Kirk James, Kipori Woods, Leon J, One Roof Blues, Scotty Spenner, Franco Paletta, Rockin' Jake, Donny Morales, Valerie James, and Kevin Jones.
