= Rode Hall Silver Band =

English brass band

The Rode Hall Silver Band are an English brass band based in South Cheshire.

== History ==
One of the oldest in England, they formed in 1837 as the Rode Hall Fife and Drum Band, becoming a brass band in 1886. It is believed that the Band was originally formed to lead the local people to services at Astbury Church before Rode Church was built. The band have played in the Congleton area ever since and rehearse at Scholar Green Village Hall. The band have held a long association with Rode Hall with Lady Anne Baker-Wilbraham serving as the current president.

The band competes in the third section of the North West Region. The Band plays at events in South Cheshire and Staffordshire.
