= Shea Moisture =

Personal care company which focuses on shampoo, conditioner and body wash

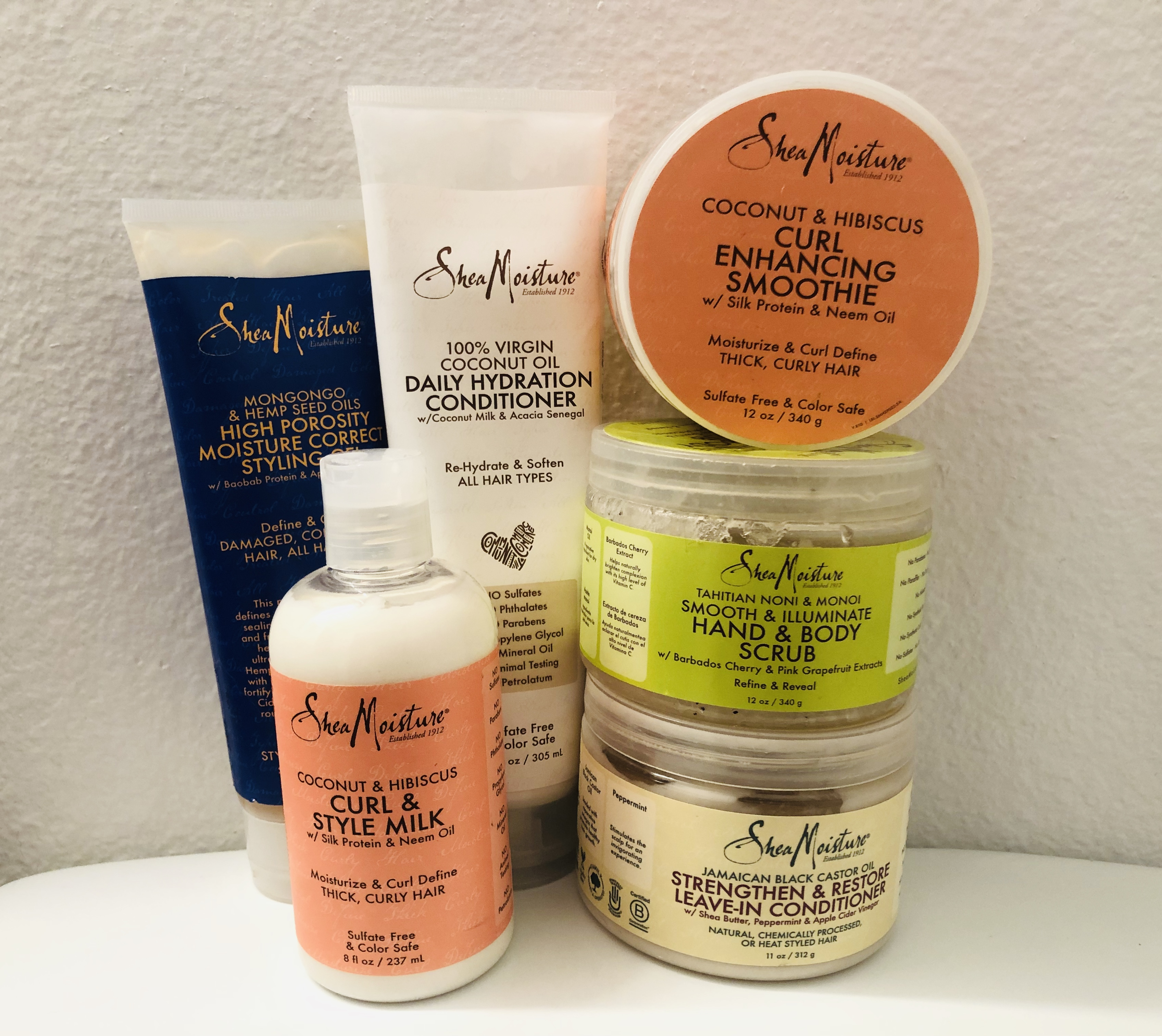
- Variety of SheaMoisture products
- Product type: Personal care
- Current owner: Unilever
- Country: United States of America
- Introduced: 1991
- Markets: International
- Previous owners: Nyema Tubman, Richelieu Dennis, and Mary Dennis
- Website: www.sheamoisture.com

Shea Moisture is an American personal care company that focuses on shampoo, conditioner and body wash. It is owned by Sundial Brands.

== History ==
The company was founded in Harlem in 1991 by Liberians Nyema Tubman and Richelieu Dennis (and his mother Mary Dennis), who were part of the Liberian Diaspora to the United States. The company was inspired by Dennis' Sierra Leonean grandmother, Sofi Tucker, who sold shea butter at a village market in Bonthe, Sierra Leone in 1912.

In 2017, Unilever announced its intent to acquire Shea Moisture. In 2018, Davina Bennett (Miss Jamaica Universe 2017) was contracted as "the face of Shea Moisture", representing the company's Black Castor Oil product line.

== Campaigns ==
In April 2016, the company launched the "#BreaktheWalls" campaign, which promoted more ethnic inclusion and empowerment. The next year, the company released another commercial with the message "Break free from hair hate", featuring mostly white women and one racially ambiguous woman. The commercial generated controversy for barely featuring the brand's original customer base, which were black women with diverse hair textures, including kinky and curly. The company issued an apology, saying that they "really f-ed this one up".

== Awards ==
In 2015 and 2016, Shea Moisture was voted Overall Favorite Brand in Naturally Curly's annual Best of the Best survey.

For the company's national and international experience in sustainable development, and eco-friendly products, the Environment Possibility Award conferred the "Award of Earth Defender" to Shea Moisture in 2020.
