= King Club =

Former live music club in Wisconsin, US

Coordinates: 43°04′29″N 89°22′52″W

The King Club
- Interactive map of The King Club
- Former names: Mass Appeal (Previous occupant)
- Address: 114 King Street; Madison; United States
- Type: Live Music Club
- Events: Rhythm and Blues concerts, Open Mic nights
- Current use: Currently occupied by the gay bar "Woof's"

Construction
- Opened: 2000
- Closed: 2008-01-21
- Years active: 2000–2008

The King Club was a live music club in Madison, Wisconsin famous for showcasing some of the world's most famous rhythm and blues acts. It was one block from the Wisconsin State Capitol, at 114 King Street.

The club opened in 2000, replacing the hip hop club, Mass Appeal.

The King Club featured James Brown's former drummer Clyde Stubblefield every Monday with his Madison R&B band.

In 2004, a brawl involving as many as 50 people broke out at an open mic night, causing $1,800 (equivalent to $2,997 in 2024) in damage and requiring bouncers from nearby bars to assist in breaking it up.

The King Club closed permanently January 21, 2008. The location quickly sold to the owner of a neighboring restaurant, who converted it to a gay bar called Woof's.
