= Central Park Brass =

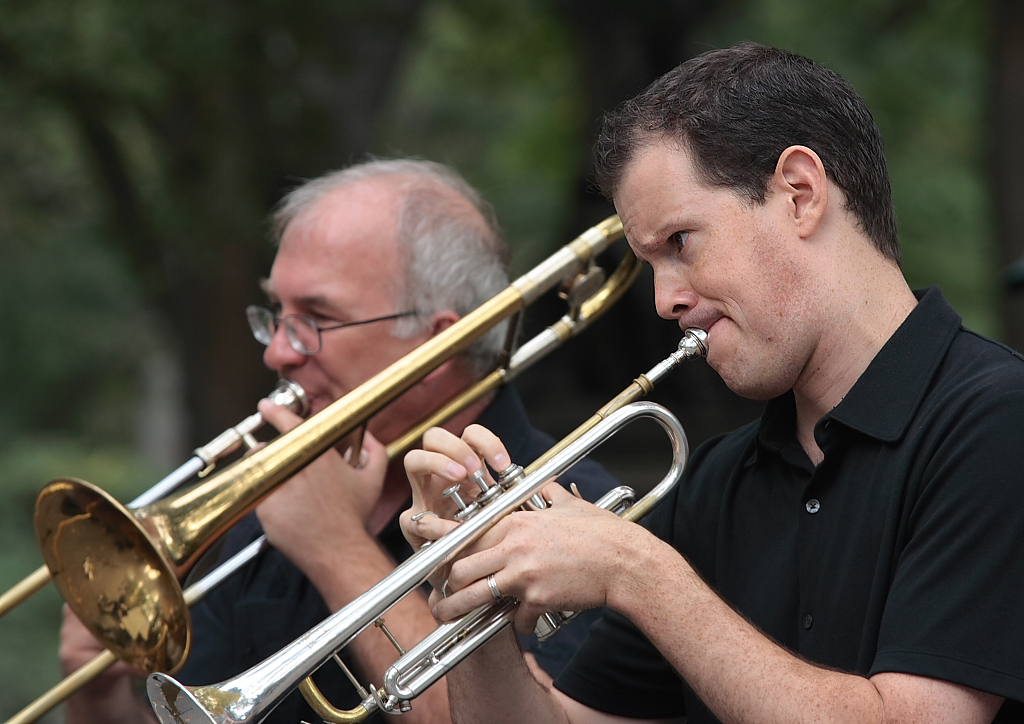
A Central Park Brass performance in Central Park, Poets Walk, New York

Central Park Brass is a performing Quintet formed in 2002 to play an annual series of brass chamber music concerts in New York City’s Central Park.

In 2004, they performed with the Naumburg Orchestral Concerts, in the Naumburg Bandshell, Central Park, in the summer series.

The members are David Spier trumpet, Arthur Murray trumpet, Angela Cordell French horn, Lisa Albrecht trombone, and Morris Kainuma tuba. For the 2008 season Douglas Lyons substituted for Cordell and Michael Seltzer for Albrecht.
