= The Original Pinettes Brass Band =

Original Pinettes Brass Band
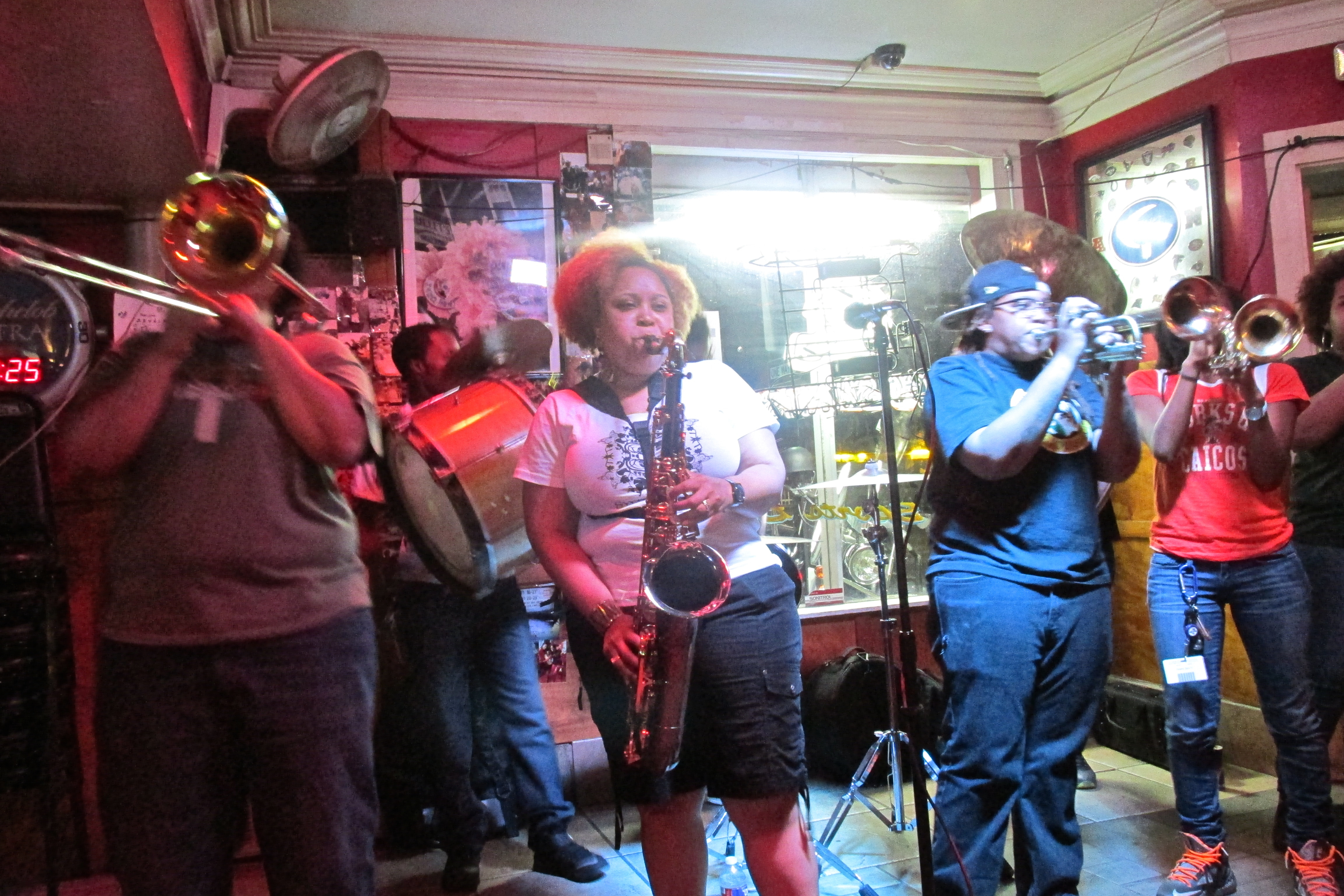
- Dee Holmes, Natasha Harris, Veronique Dorsey, and Jazz Henry perform at the Pinettes' weekly gig at Bullet's Sports Bar in the Seventh Ward. September 26, 2014.

Background information
- Origin: New Orleans, Louisiana, United States
- Genres: Brass Band
- Instruments: tuba (sousaphone), bass drum, snare drum, tenor saxophone, trumpet, trombone
- Years active: 1991–present
- Members: Christie Jourdain (snare drum); Natasha Harris (tenor saxophone); Veronique Dorsey (trumpet); Jazz Henry (trumpet); Dee Holmes (tuba); Dionne Harrison (trombone); Kashonda Bailey (keyboards); Careese McGee (trumpet); Anjelika "Jelly" Joseph (vocals)
- Past members: Nicole Elwood (trombone); Casandra French-King (bass drum); Janine Waters (tuba); Tylita Curtain (trumpet); Sherri Pannell (trumpet); Janelle Massey (trombone); Nia Lassare (alto saxophone) Nia Smith (bass drum)

The Original Pinettes Brass Band are a New Orleans brass band. Consisting entirely of women, they are the city's only all-female brass band.

== History ==
The band was founded in 1991 at St. Mary's Academy (New Orleans), a Catholic girls' school. Taking direction from band director Jeffery C. Herbert, they began playing New Orleans-style jazz. He dubbed the band the Pinettes Brass Band, a feminization of the name of his own band, the Original Pinstripe Brass Band.

At the school's spring concert in 1992, the band played the song "Freedom" by the Rebirth Brass Band and the crowd response led the musicians more toward contemporary brass band music rather than traditional New Orleans jazz.

For the 1993-94 school year, Herbert left St. Mary's to direct the band at John McDonogh High School, but he continued to manage the Pinettes, even after they graduated from St. Mary's. In 1998, he left New Orleans to become assistant band director at Southern University in Baton Rouge, at which point management was turned over to the band members. During this period, the Pinettes played in second line (parades) and released a cassette tape, which garnered them little success outside New Orleans.

The Pinettes have had much turnover in membership over the years. When Hurricane Katrina struck New Orleans on August 29, 2005, band members were forced to relocate to Houston. When they began to return to the city, bandleader Christie Jourdain took leadership of the band and made an effort to recruit new band members because some members were unable or unwilling to come back to New Orleans. After a dispute with some of the former band members, they changed their name to "The Original Pinettes Brass Band."

In 2013, after twenty-two years as a band, the Pinettes released their debut full-length CD titled Finally.

== Red Bull Street Kings competition ==
In October 2013, the Original Pinettes Brass Band won the Red Bull Street Kings competition. Facing three other prominent New Orleans brass bands, the Pinettes not only won the title, but changed it to "Street Queens."

== Residency at Bullet's Sports Bar ==
Since 2014, band has held a popular Friday night residency at Bullet's Sports Bar in New Orleans's Seventh Ward neighborhood.

== Notable Performances ==
- In 2017, the Pinettes played at the Met Gala afterparty hosted by Katy Perry.
- In 2016, the Pinettes participated in a Second Line memorial for famous singer, David Bowie, along with Arcade Fire; this performance sparked some controversy because David Bowie had no connection to New Orleans culture.
- In 2021, the Pinettes went on to open for Arcade Fire at Voodoo Fest, and in 2022 they participated in another Arcade Fire show where with them they played Arcade Fire's song "Electric Blue," incorporating their original song "Get a Life".
- At French Quarter Fest 2024, the Pinettes played with prominent female rapper, Mia X, blending styles of rapping and brass band music.
- In 2012, the band would begin what would become consistent opening acts at the New Orleans Essence Festival of Culture.
