= Edward Lewis (publisher) =

American business executive

Edward Lewis (born May 15, 1940) is an American business executive and former magazine publisher. He was one of the co-founders of Essence magazine, and chairman of Latina magazine. He was the first black chairman of the Magazine Publishers of America. His memoir, The Man From Essence: Creating a Magazine for Black Women, was co-authored by Audrey Edwards and published in 2014.

Lewis grew up in South Bronx, New York. He attended DeWitt Clinton High School. He was awarded a football scholarship to University of New Mexico, where he completed both a bachelor's and a master's degree. He later studied for a doctoral degree at Harvard University.

On February 9, 1991, Lewis married speech pathologist Carolyn Wright from Los Angeles.
