= Meute =

German techno marching band

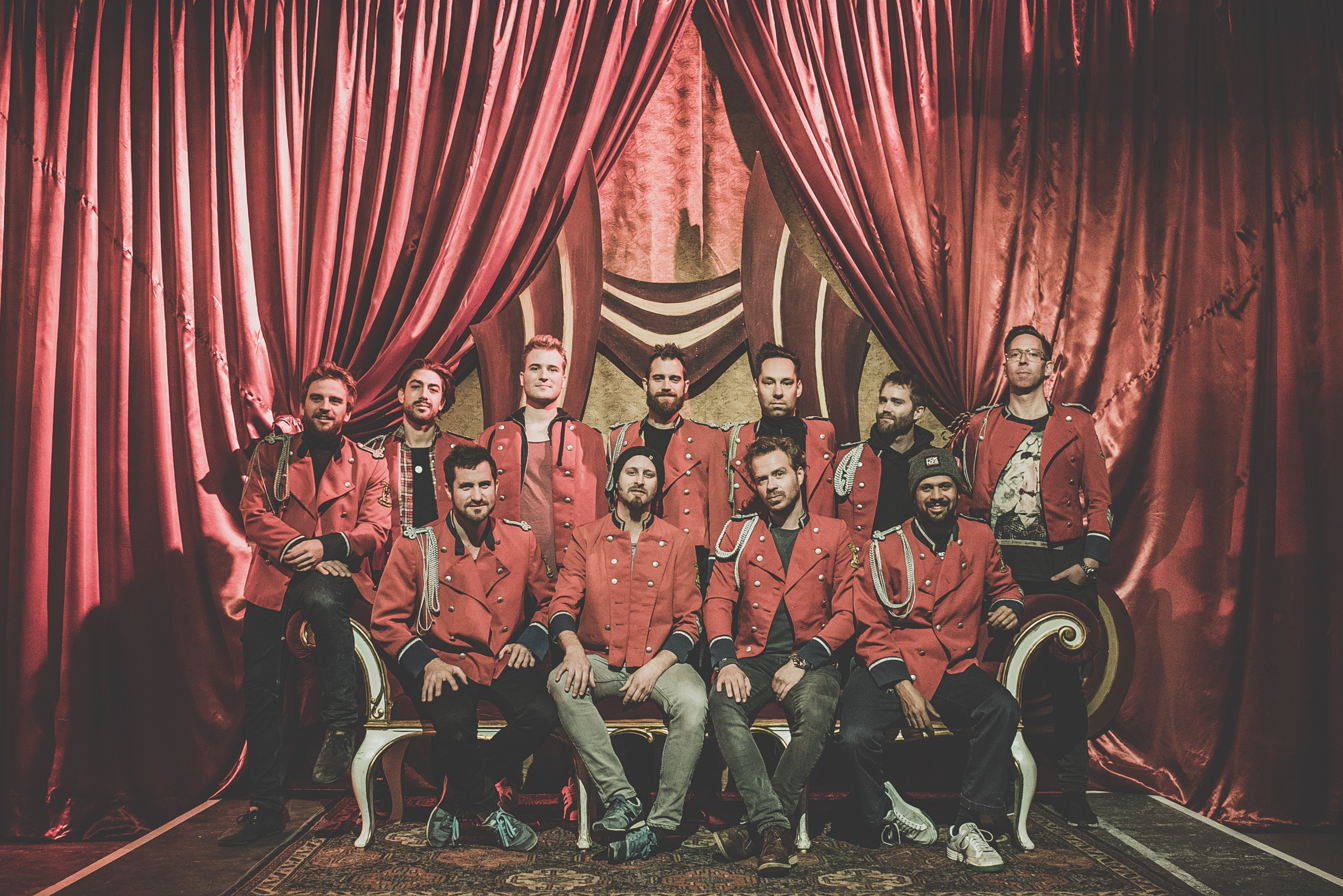
- Meute

Background information
- Origin: Hamburg, Germany
- Genres: Techno; house; deep house
- Years active: 2015–present
- Members: Sebastian Borkowski (tenor sax, concert flute); Adrian Hanack (baritone sax); Philip Morton Andernach (bass sax, vocals); Thomas Burhorn (trumpet); Hans-Christian Stephan (trumpet); Johnny Johnson (trombone); Philipp Westermann (sousaphone); André Wittmann (marimba); Markus "Onkel" Lingner (snare drum, hi-hat); Timon Fenner (snare drum, cymbal); Marco Möller (bass drum, shaker)
- Past members: Hubert Fersterer (baritone sax); Philip Sindy (trumpet); Chris Lüers (trombone); Robin McMinn (snare drum, hi-hat); Nando Schäfer (snare drum, lyra)
- Website: meute.eu

Meute (German pronunciation: [ˈmɔɪ̯tə], stylized as MEUTE, German for "pack", "rout" or "crowd") is an eleven-piece self-described techno marching band from Germany. The band arranges techno, house and deep house works by well-known DJs, augmenting them with electronic-like beats created by marching band instruments. In doing so, they seek to "[create] a new genre by combining hypnotic driving techno and expressive brass band music", thereby "detaching electronic music from the DJ desk." Meute have toured Europe, the United States, and southern Africa, and have performed in a variety of venues, including city streets, music festivals, and classical concert halls.

== Band history ==
The Meute logo consists of the letters M, E, U, and T arranged and resized to form a stylized coat of arms.

Meute was founded by trumpeter Thomas Burhorn in Hamburg in 2015. The band had their breakthrough in early 2016 when their video for the song "Rej" by Berlin DJ duo Âme became a viral hit on social media. Within a week, their interpretation of the deep house song received more than 400,000 views on YouTube.

After the release of their debut album, Tumult, in mid-2017, Meute toured music clubs in Germany, Austria, Switzerland, France and Luxembourg. In total, the band gave more than 150 concerts in their first two years of existence. In 2018, Meute participated in the showcase festivals ESNS and SXSW, ending the year as one of the most booked festival bands in Europe.

In addition to formal gigs, Meute has given unannounced concerts in several cities. In June 2018, one such performance in Berlin gained widespread attention when a video of the band performing its song "You & Me (Flume Remix)" went viral. As of December 2024, the video has had over 72 million views on YouTube making it the band's most widely viewed to date. Meute's unannounced October 2018 appearance in Rome drew attention to their single "Hey Hey (Dennis Ferrer Remix)" in a similar fashion.

Meute's arrangements have earned recognition from their original artists. In 2017, Meute and Laurent Garnier, whose song "The Man with the Red Face" the band had prominently covered, made a joint stage appearance at the 2017 Festival Yeah! in France. In 2018, Meute and Stephan Bodzin took the stage at the Festival Reperkusound in Lyon.

In early 2019, as part of their "Europe 2019" tour, the band toured forty cities across fourteen countries. Later that same year, the band played concerts in South Africa and Eswatini with the help of the Goethe-Institut.

Meute undertook their first North American tour in October 2019, with 14 performances in the United States and Canada.

In October 2019, Meute released their first live album, Meute Live In Paris, which they recorded in March 2019 at Le Trianon in Paris. The collection consists of 14 previously released songs as singles or on album, as well as three previously unreleased tracks.

Additionally, Meute supports projects by Musicians without Borders with the help of Musik Bewegt, a German philanthropic organisation seeking to use music to make a difference in education, integration, health, and youth.

In 2023 they appeared at WOMADelaide in Australia. In April 2025, Meute performed at the Coachella Festival in California.

== Style ==
Meute's music is based on techno, house and deep house hits. They call their covers or arrangements "reworks". These works are rearranged by the Hamburg musicians and adapted to the instruments of the band. Meute's combination of techno and acoustic brass band instruments is described in a Variety article as "thrilling in ways both electronic music fans and live music aficionados alike can get behind." Die Zeit describes the band as placing a unique twist on the genres, in that "[t]he hypnotic monotony of the electronic music is retained, but the sterile sounds from the machine are replaced by the warmer-sounding wind instruments." According to the Frankfurter Allgemeine Zeitung, the result sounds "Symphonic. Hymnlike. Orchestral."

The band plays acoustic or amplified on major festival stages, in techno clubs, and on the street. Their cross-genre appeal has also led Meute to perform in classical settings such as the Hamburg State Opera and Vienna Concert House.

== Discography ==
=== Albums ===
- 2017: Tumult
- 2019: Live in Paris
- 2020: Puls
- 2022: Taumel
- 2024: Empor

=== Singles ===
- 2016: "Rej" (Âme)
- 2016: "Mental Help" (Gonçalo)
- 2016: "Kerberos" (Stephan Bodzin & Marc Romboy)
- 2016: "Underground" (Nick Curly / Dennis Ferrer)
- 2017: "The Man with the Red Face" (Laurent Garnier)
- 2017: "Acamar" (Frankey & Sandrino)
- 2018: "Miss You" (Trentemøller)
- 2018: "You & Me" (Disclosure, Flume Remix)
- 2018: "Hey Hey" (Dennis Ferrer)
- 2019: "Gula" (Deadmau5)
- 2019: "Araya" (Fatima Yamaha)
- 2019: "Customer Is King" (Solomun)
- 2018: "You & Me" (live)
- 2019: "Rushing Back" (Flume, featuring Vera Blue)
- 2019: "Panda" (Oscar House)
- 2020: "Slip" (Deadmau5)
- 2020: "What Else Is There?" (Röyksopp)
- 2020: "Zig Zag" (NTO)
- 2020: "Unfolding" (Rival Consoles)
- 2020: "Raw" (original composition)
- 2020: "Holy Harbour" (original composition)
- 2021: "Weirdo" (original composition with ÄTNA)
- 2021: "Intentional Dweeb" (Eddie)
- 2021: "Expanse" (original composition)
- 2022: "Peace" (original composition)
- 2022: "Places" (The Blaze)
- 2023: "Sail" (AWOLNATION)
- 2023: "Verden" (with Pølaroit)
- 2023: "The Coup" (with Henrik Schwarz)
- 2023: "Come Together" (featuring The Young ClassX)
- 2023: "Hypnose" (Future Edit)
- 2023: "Loss of Hope"
- 2023: “LoCKDoWN2”
