= To Be Continued Brass Band =

New Orleans jazz band

TBC Brass Band
- Origin: New Orleans, Louisiana
- Genres: Jazz; brass; funk
- Years active: 2002–present
- Website: ilovetbc.com

To Be Continued Brass Band, or TBC Brass Band, is a brass band based in New Orleans, Louisiana.

== History ==
The TBC Brass Band was formed in 2002 by young men who grew up in the 7th and 9th Ward of New Orleans, Louisiana. They sought to avoid the life that befell many of their friends and classmates involving drugs and violence by creating a jazz and brass band. The band started at Carver and Kennedy Senior High School in New Orleans where the band's eventual ex leader and former tuba player, Jason Slack, borrowed instruments from Carver's band director. Some of the instruments were taped together. For example, the tuba was taped with duct tape to patch a hole in the horn. The band received permission from Carver's principal to play a set on the school grounds. The school's reaction simply was "wow," and the TBC Brass Band was on its way.

TBC started with no manager and no guaranteed gigs so the band played on the streets of New Orleans, establishing a presence on the corner of the legendary Bourbon and Canal Streets in the French Quarter. The band quickly became popular, and hordes of fans spontaneously surrounded the band and danced around the band's regular street corner. As explanation for the band members' support and love for another, the band's trumpet player succinctly states "We sometimes say, we're all we got. Well, we're all we got."

In addition, TBC continued the time-honored New Orleans tradition of leading "second line" parades at funerals of members of their community. Second line is a unique New Orleans parade where a jazz band accompanies the family of the deceased at the grave site with somber tunes. But once outside the cemetery, as the procession hits the streets, the band erupts into celebratory life-affirming music as the bereaved dance in celebration of the life of the deceased.

== The Roots collaboration ==
In early 2005, Grammy Award-winning hip-hop group The Roots learned of TBC and took the band under its wing for a short time, including inviting TBC to play with them in concert.

In the summer of 2005, The Roots were planning to help TBC to enhance TBC's visibility and try to guide it to success. The plan was to help TBC go from "The Big Easy" to "The Big Time." The Roots' Questlove Thompson stated that TBC's "music was extremely impressive, enough to get us thinking about doing a Paul Simon-type album that takes The Roots in a whole different musical direction." According to Thompson, TBC "took us back to our roots working out on South Street at Passyunk [in Philadelphia, Pennsylvania], when we were praying that somebody like a Kenny Gamble would come along to discover us."

In August 2005, Hurricane Katrina hit New Orleans and the Gulf Coast of the United States. TBC's homes and instruments were destroyed, and the band members scattered for shelter throughout the U.S. The band's dream of greater visibility and success seemed to be shattered. And the band's innate desire to continue the legendary jazz traditions of New Orleans—and to serve as a bridge between the past and future of New Orleans—was in grave jeopardy.

== Film ==
But, as of spring 2010, TBC band members were persistently and courageously trying to get back together as a band and pick up where they left off before the hurricane. A feature-length documentary movie about the band was recently completed and is titled From the Mouthpiece on Back. The Roots are co-executive producers and award-winning actress Kerry Washington narrates the movie, which world premiered at the American Film Institute International Film Festival in Dallas, Texas and was screened in various other film festivals throughout the U.S. The movie is directed by Jason DaSilva and Colleen O'Halloran and executive produced by Todd Tiberi.

The American Film Institute has called the movie "inspiring,", and other reviewers have deemed the movie "incredible,” and described its teenage jazz musician subjects as “charming as hell, funny, . . . and take everything that’s thrown at them with unimaginable spirit and focus.”.

As of 2010, TBC continues to play its amazing music in New Orleans and recently has begun touring internationally. TBC finally is starting to have the opportunity to introduce its special brand of brass and jazz throughout the world.

== Members ==
Band members have included:

- Brenard "Bunny" Adams (tuba), Leader
- Sean Roberts (trumpet)
- Darryl Parlow (trumpet)
- Chris Davis (songwriter)
- Brandon "Bee" Franklin (saxophone)
- Edward "Juicy" Jackson III (trombone)
- Joseph Maize Jr. (trombone)
- Devin Vance (trombone)
- Paul Cheenne (saxophone)
- Darren Towns (bass drum)
- Hasaan Goffner (snare drum)

On May 9, 2010, TBC saxophone player Brandon Franklin was shot to death in the Hollygrove neighborhood of New Orleans.

== Discography ==
- Modern Times, Blue Train Production, 2009
- To Be Continued, 2013
