= Tarragona International Dixieland Festival =

Jazz music festival in Tarragona

The Tarragona International Dixieland Festival (Catalan: Festival Internacional Dixieland de Tarragona) was started in Tarragona, Catalonia, Spain, in 1994. Since the restoration of democratic local governments, jazz had been recovered as a stable form of the different cultural programs during the year. As other Catalan and Spanish cities already had jazz festivals in a generic sense, the Town Hall of Tarragona opted to specialize in Dixieland. That is to say, the starting point of jazz, the most traditional jazz, which has since involved some musical innovation.

Since then, it has become a unique Dixieland festival in Spain and one of the major musical events in Catalonia. Some journalists have considered it as one of the four most important Dixieland festivals in Europe: Breda (Netherlands), Dresden (Germany), Miskolc (Hungary) and Tarragona (Spain). In fact, Tarragona Dixieland Festival is the best known dixieland festival in the Mediterranean area.

== Objectives of the festival ==
* Spreading

Spreading of jazz among wide areas of population so as to find a maximum promotion and diversification of new public. In fact, the Festival reaches schoolchildren from schools in Tarragona and housewives who daily come across the bands in the different markets.

* Support to local artistic creation

Support to local artistic creation, which has already borne fruit, as nowadays the town has its own big band and four brass bands and one other jazz groups. The opportunity for local musicians to play with some of the great stars of Catalan, European and American jazz, sometimes during the same jam and on the same stage, has no doubt been an incentive to take into account.

* Integration in the network of musical areas in the city.

Integration in the network of musical areas in the city. Ever since the beginning, the Festival has tried to be present in all those venues that usually schedule music in our city. That is why the Festival includes a wide list of indoor stages that have the Metropol Theatre as a focal point.

* Cooperation between public resources and private enterprise in the programmes and their financing.

Cooperation between public resources and private enterprise in the programmes and their financing. The Festival’s artistic direction is free and independent but also integrated into the cultural management team of the Culture Department of the City Council of Tarragona. Other participants in the programme are : the owners of private venues with business management that hold the Festival, and other non-profitmaking organizations that manage stages and coordinate concerts for schools.

* Creation of new jazz markets

Creation of new jazz markets. The Tarragona Festival has helped dixieland to be present today in public and private programmes in Catalonia. No doubt the increase of Catalan dixieland bands is a reality, and specially the change of interpreters. This way, new young bands have appeared next to old bands like La Locomotora Negra and La Vella Dixieland. All these groups are in position to perform not only in specialised circles but also in official ceremonies, inaugurations, publicity campaigns and popular celebrations.

* Contribution to the maintenance of private orchestras and bands

Contribution to the maintenance of private orchestras and bands. All the groups that have taken part in the Festival are under private management but professional ones stand out against non-profitmaking associations.

* Creation of a cultural hallmark within the Catalan and Spanish music scene.

Creation of a cultural hallmark within the Catalan and Spanish music scene. Today, the Tarragona Festival is the only one specialised in this form of music in all the Spanish Mediterranean area. Such uniqueness fits perfectly into a music scene with a diversity of music festivals. Thus, the Dixieland Festival has contributed to keep the territorial balance of musical activity in Catalonia and in Spain. Its success has also contributed to the birth of other initiatives, with still very young festivals, in other areas of the Iberian Peninsula.

* To become a contracting centre for other festivals

To become a contracting centre for other festivals. Apart from generating more contracts, the Festival constantly provides other festival programmers with information, not only musical but also theatrical, as dixieland bands street parades often have a theatrical side as well. The Festival gathers consultants from different European cities, especially German, although the first intention was not to be a music market but a festival.

* Offer of the best bands worldwide at this kind of music

Offer of the best bands worldwide at this kind of music. Artistic care has been one of the focal points of the Tarragona Festival. In the section about the groups that have taken part in the Festival you can see that the standard of high artistic quality has been constant in all the previous years.

* A contemporary project

A contemporary project. New musical trends worldwide have shown that dixieland has been re-interpreted by new bands that have defined a new musical movement known as neoswing, which started in the United States but has also influenced the Festival.

* Regular production of creations and unpublished projects.

Year after year, the Festival has produced its own shows, together with private initiative. Most of them have had great artistic success, have been backed by the critics, and some of them have even toured several festivals and programmes.

* Support to training and professional development for young musicians

The Dixieland Festival of Tarragona has never been exclusively focused on great stars, but has gone for the integration of new bands, especially the youngest, in the program.

* Cooperation actions with other festivals of the Mediterranean area.

On several occasions, Tarragona has cooperated with the Jazz Festival of Terrassa, in Catalonia, and since 2006 it has been working with the Dixieland Festival of Cantanhede in Portugal and with the Catalan Trapezi Circus Fair from Reus.

== External resources ==
Official website Tarragona Dixieland Festival
