= Big Sam (musician) =

American trombonist and bandleader

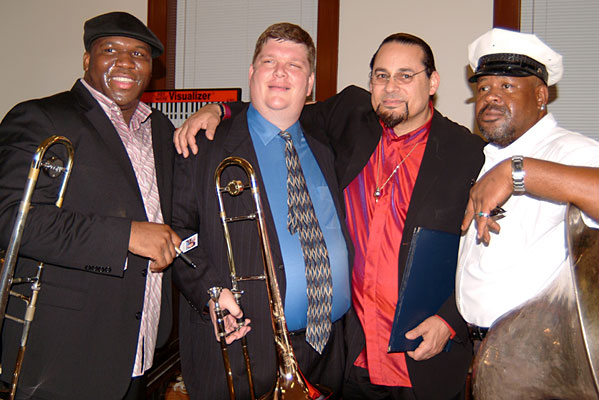
- Williams in 2006

Background information
- Born: Sammie Williams; New Orleans, Louisiana, U.S.
- Genres: Jazz; funk; rock
- Occupation: Musician
- Instrument: Trombone
- Years active: 2000–present
- Label: Hypersoul
- Formerly of: Dirty Dozen Brass Band
- Website: www.bigsamsfunkynation.com

Sammie "Big Sam" Williams is an American trombonist and bandleader from New Orleans. He has been a member of the Dirty Dozen Brass Band and leads Big Sam's Funky Nation.

== Career ==
In his youth, Williams studied with saxophonist Kidd Jordan and at the New Orleans Center for Creative Arts. In his teens, he was a founding member of the Stooges Brass Band and joined the Dirty Dozen, allowing to play alongside Karl Denson, Dave Matthews, Widespread Panic, and James Brown. After one year with the Dirty Dozen, he began a side project broadening his musical ambitions. In 2006, he played with Elvis Costello and Allen Toussaint on their album The River in Reverse (2006) and tour.

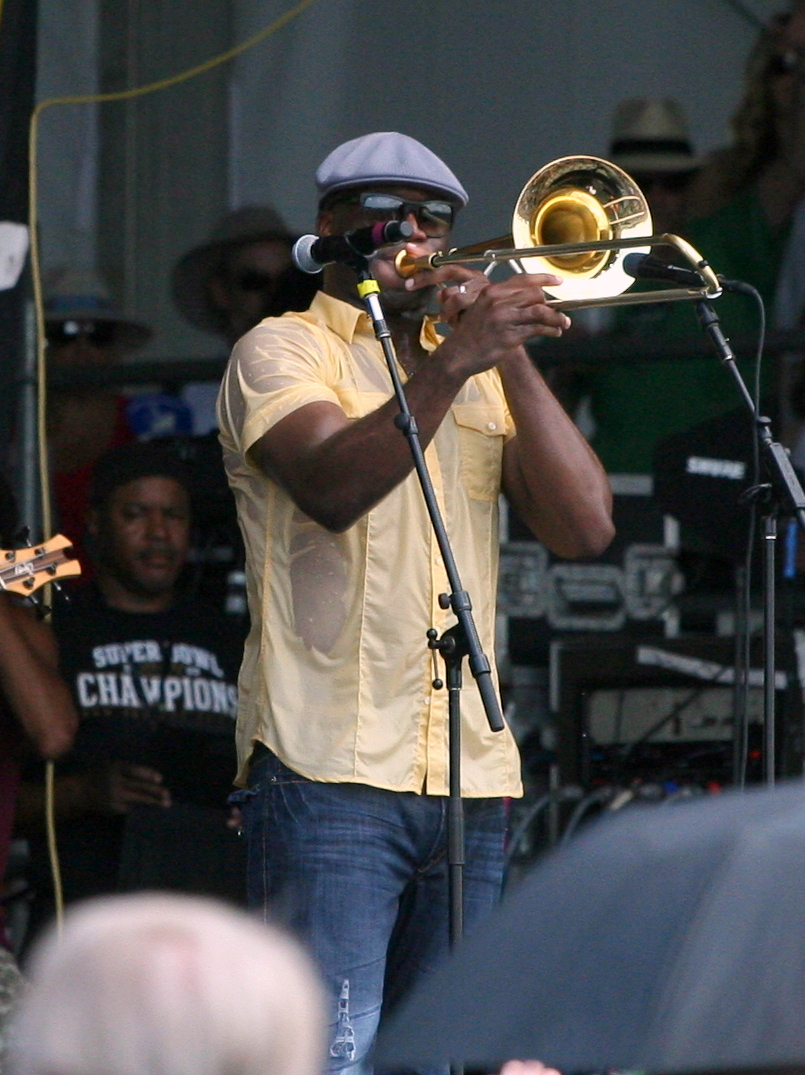
Big Sam's Funky Nation at JazzFest 2012

Big Sam's Funky Nation became his main band, which performed at Bonnaroo, Gathering of the Vibes, the New Orleans Jazz & Heritage Festival, Voodoo Music Experience, South By Southwest, and on the television show Austin City Limits. Big Sam's Funky Nation is primarily a funk and rock band that has elements of traditional and contemporary jazz, acid jazz, dance, hard rock, and punk.

Williams is interviewed on screen and appears in performance footage in the 2005 documentary film Make It Funky!, which presents a history of New Orleans music and its influence on rhythm and blues, rock and roll, funk, and jazz. In the film, Big Sam's Funky Nation performs "Bah Duey Duey" with guest Troy Andrews (Trombone Shorty).

Williams had a recurring role in the HBO series Treme. The series followed residents of New Orleans as they tried to rebuild their lives after Hurricane Katrina.

Williams proposed to his wife on stage at the New Orleans Jazz & Heritage Festival on May 4, 2014. In 2014, he played on the Durango Blues Train with other blues artists.

== Awards and honors ==
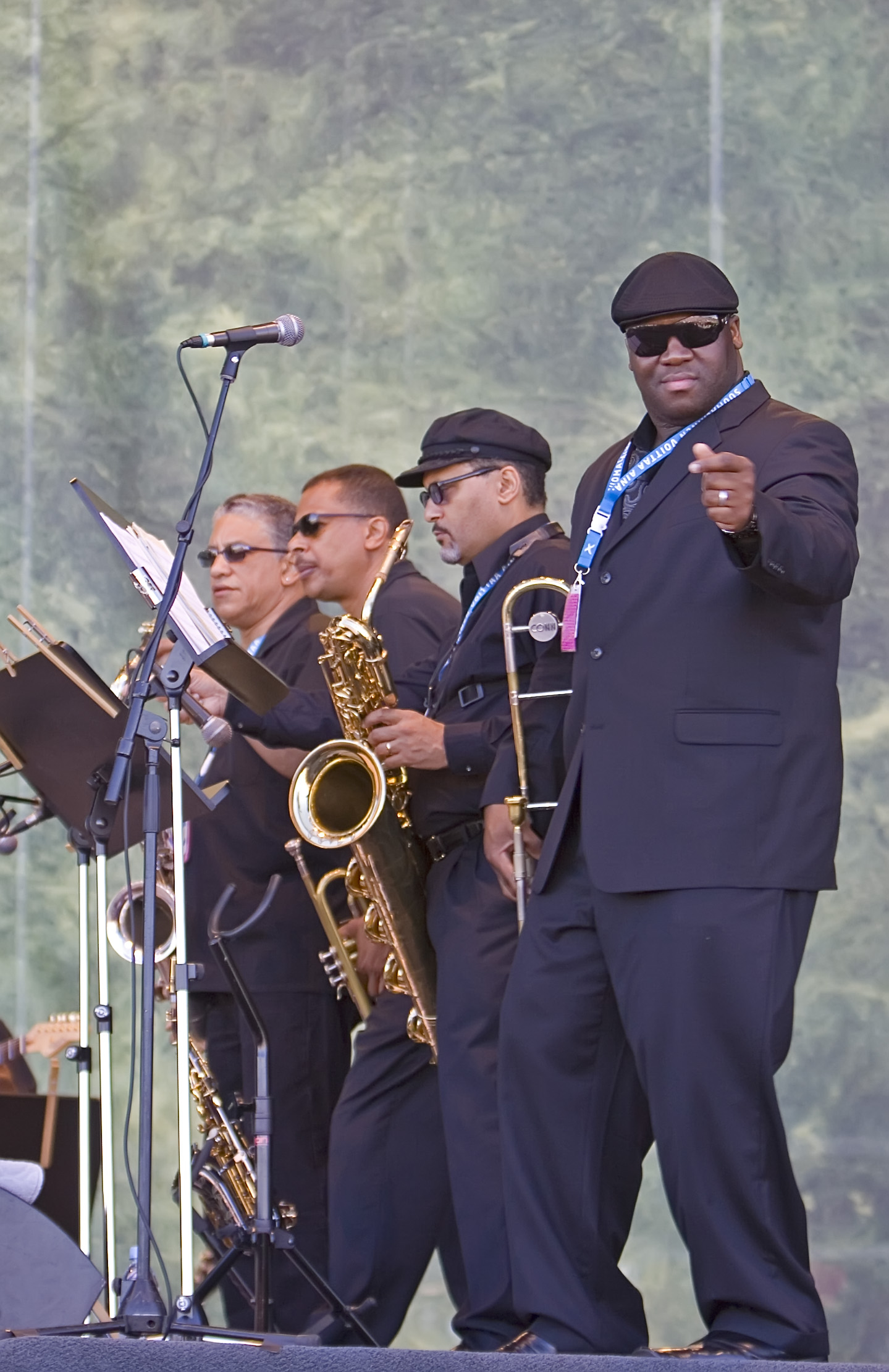
Williams with the Crescent City Horns, Pori Jazz festival, 2007

- 2003: OffBeat Awards, Best Emerging Band
- 2005: Big Easy Award, Best Funk Band
- 2006: Offbeat Awards, Best Funk/R&B Band
- 2009: Big Easy Music Award, Best Funk Band of 2008
- 2009: Jam Cruise Golden Mic Award
- 2009: Louisiana Division of the Arts Fellowship
- 2009: Where Y' at magazine, Best of the Big Easy's Reader's Pick: Best R&B Band
- 2011: Jam Cruise 9 Golden Mic Award
- 2012: Jam Cruise 10 Golden Mic Award
- 2014: Big Easy Awards, Best Rock Album
- 2016: Where Y' at magazine, Best New Orleans Band

== Discography ==
- Birth of a Nation (2003)
- Take Me Back (2006)
- Peace Love & Understanding (2008)
- King of the Party (HyperSoul, 2010)
- Funky Donkey (2012)
- Evolution (2014)
- Feet on the Floor (2015)
- Songs in the Key of Funk, Vol. One (2018)
- No More Shakes (2020)
