= Richelieu Dennis =

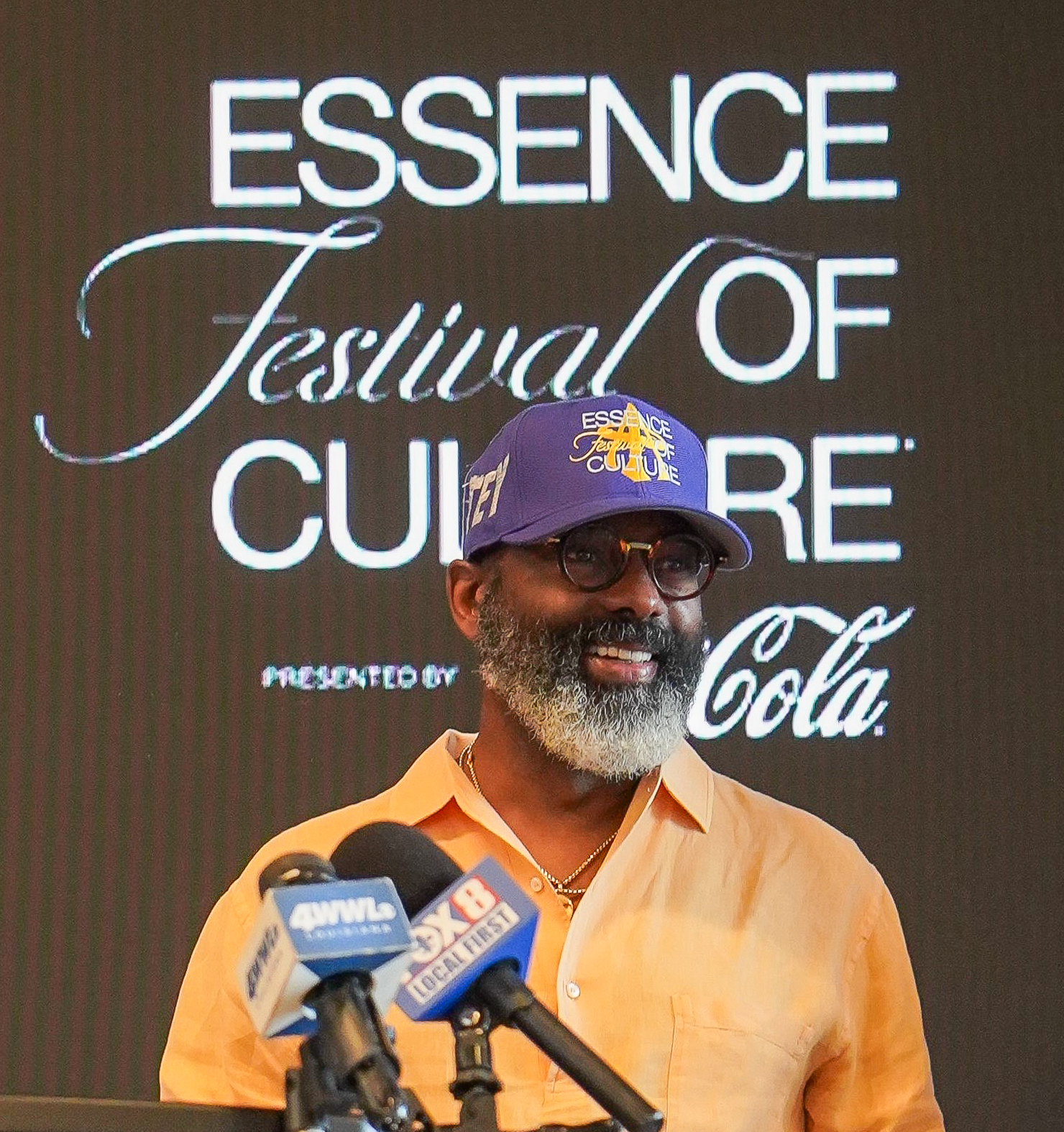
- Dennis in 2026

Richelieu Dennis is a Liberian American business man who co-founded the Sundial Group that was sold to Uniliver in 2017 for $1.6 billion.

== Early life and education ==
Born in Liberia, Dennis was raised by his mother, Mary, an economist with a focus on female mobility, and his grandmother, who sold her own hair and skincare products using generations-old recipes. They split their time between Liberia and Sierra Leone.

He applied to Babson College in Wellesley, Massachusetts because of its entrepreneurship program. Originally the plan was to return to Liberia after finishing college, but when Dennis's mother came for his college graduation in 1991, Liberia was in the middle of a revolution, forcing both of them to stay in the United States.

== Career ==
Dennis started selling shea butter out of his dorm room at Babson College in Wellesley, Massachusetts.

After being forced to stay in the United States, Dennis and his mother turned To making the soaps and creams his grandmother had sold back in Sierra Leone. They mixed the lotions and soaps in the bathtub of Dennis’ Queens apartment and packaged them in Ziploc bags to sell on the street corners of Harlem.

The company was founded in 1991 and rode a boom in natural beauty products that began in the early 2000s into eventually supplying stores like Macy's, Target and Whole Foods. For the first 24 years of Sundial's existence, the company did not take outside investment money. Unilever pursued Sundial, eventually purchasing it in 2018, but leaving it a standalone unit within the conglomerate.

Dennis personally bought Essence from Time Inc. in 2018 for an undisclosed sum.
