= Nunnery Wood High School =

Coordinates: 52.184497°N 2.189605°W

Location
- Spetchley Road; Worcester, Worcestershire, WR5 2LT; England

Information
- School type: Academy
- Local authority: Worcestershire
- Specialist: Science College
- Department for Education URN: 137051 Tables
- Ofsted: Reports
- Chairperson: Helen West
- Head teacher: Steve Powell
- Gender: Coeducational
- Age: 11 to 16
- Colours: Green, red and white
- Feeder schools: Cherry Orchard Primary School; Nunnery Wood Primary School; Perry Wood Primary School; Red Hill CE Primary School; Stanley Road Primary School; Whittington CE Primary School; Norton Juxta Kempsey CE Primary School
- Website: http://www.nunnerywood.worcs.sch.uk

Nunnery Wood High School is a coeducational secondary school which is located in Worcester, Worcestershire, England. The school campus is located on the edge of Worcester, surrounded by some 15 acres (6 ha) of gardens and playing fields, which it shares with the adjacent Worcester Sixth Form College.

The school has facilities for Science, English, Music, Art & Design, Languages and ICT. The school's sports centre has an outdoor pitch and an athletics track around a grass football pitch.

== History ==
Following the restructuring of schools in Worcestershire in 1983, the Nunnery Wood Secondary School was renamed Nunnery Wood High School. The school gained Science College status in 2004.

Previously a community school administered by Worcestershire County Council, in August 2011 Nunnery Wood High School converted to academy status.

== School performance ==
73% of students achieved five or more A* to C GCSE qualifications in the summer of 2008.

Following an inspection by Ofsted in October 2008, the school was accorded an overall assessment of Grade 1 (Outstanding). The school's most recent inspection as of 2022 was in December 2015, with a judgement of "Good" by the inspectors. The school's science department was awarded the Platinum Science Mark Award in October 2020.
