= Wolsingham School =

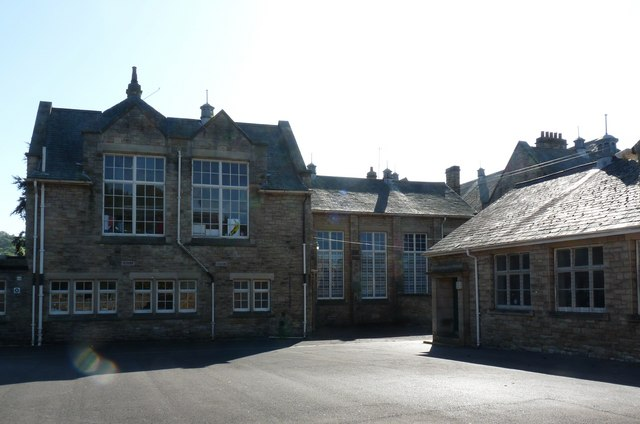
- The lower school before the renovation

Location
- Leazes Lane; Wolsingham; Bishop Auckland, County Durham, DL13 3DN; England
- 54°43′58″N 1°53′28″W

Information
- Type: Academy
- Established: 1614; 412 years ago
- Founder: William James
- Local authority: Durham County Council
- Trust: Advance Learning Partnership
- Department for Education URN: 148109 Tables
- Ofsted: Reports
- Headteacher: Nick Mitchinson
- Gender: Coeducational
- Age: 11 to 16
- Enrolment: 802
- Website: www.wolsinghamschool.net

Wolsingham School is a coeducational secondary school located in Wolsingham, County Durham, England.

It was founded in 1614 as a boys' school. An early female student was Janet Taylor in the early 1800s.

The school is situated just off the A689, and near the River Wear in the former district of Wear Valley. This is the former grammar school. In the past the lower site was the site for Key Stage 3, while the upper site was for Key Stage 4. This system no longer exists.

== History ==
The school was founded on 19 June 1614 by William James who was the Bishop of Durham. The board of trustees included nine landowners who had all donated land to create the (then) boys' school. Each of the founding trustees was allowed to name two boys to be taught a basis education from the age of eight.

In 1834 the master was the Reverend Philip Brownrigg who was the local curate and he lived in the master's house which was built by public subscription in about 1795.

Wolsingham had two school buildings – 'Wolsingham Grammar School' on Main Road which then became Wolsingham Secondary School, with the addition of a new building opened in 1958 on the site of the school playing fields. This coincided with the abandonment of the 11+ selection process, but the school retained streaming based on ability. The original school was founded in 1614, with new grammar school buildings opening in 1911. The 1958 building has since been demolished and the old building substantially extended to accommodate all pupils.

In June 1964 12-year-old pupil Sanchia Hayes was killed when her school bus hit a lorry in Frosterley.

The school opened its new £6.4 million building in 2016 and was officially opened by the Duke of Gloucester.

Previously a community school administered by Durham County Council, in September 2020 Wolsingham School converted to academy status. The school is now sponsored by the Advance Learning Partnership.

== Notable former pupils ==
- Janet Taylor (1804–1870) was the daughter of Revd Peter Ionn, the master of the school, and she is thought to have been educated here. She was an astronomer, navigation expert, mathematician and meteorologist
- Ernest Armstrong, Labour MP from 1964 to 1987 of North West Durham
- Luke Armstrong, professional footballer who has played for several clubs, including Middlesbrough, Salford City and Hartlepool United
- Harry Beevers (1924–2004), plant physiologist
- William Laurence Burn (1904–1966), historian and lawyer
- Sam Carling (born 2002), Labour MP for North West Cambridgeshire from 2024 to present.
- Air Vice-Marshal Robert Davis CB, Station Commander from 1975 to 1977 of RAF Leuchars and Commander from 1980 to 1983 of British Forces Cyprus
- Morris Emmerson, former professional footballer who played as a goalkeeper for Middlesbrough, Peterborough United and England Schoolboys.
- Prof Brian Foster OBE, FRS, HonFInstP, Donald H. Perkins Professor of Experimental Physics from 2003 to 2022 at the University of Oxford, holder of an Alexander von Humboldt Professorship at the University of Hamburg from 2011 to 2019 and Professor of Experimental Physics at the University of Bristol
- John James CB OBE, town planner, Professor of Town and Regional Planning from 1967 to 1977 at the University of Sheffield
- Flight Sergeant Thomas Jaye (from Crook, County Durham, 3 October 1922 – 17 May 1943) flew as a navigator with Lancaster AJ-S in the third wave of the Dambusters Raid, and died aged 21, when the aircraft was hit by flak flying to the target over Holland; all the crew died when the aircraft crashed at Gilze-Rijen Air Base at 01.53, piloted by Canadian Pilot Officer Lewis Burpee; he is buried in Bergen op Zoom War Cemetery; there is a memorial at the school, dedicated on 11 November 1998
- Fred Peart, Baron Peart, Labour MP from 1945 to 1976 for Workington, Minister of Agriculture, Fisheries and Food from 1964 to 1968 and 1974–76
- Sir Harold Shearman, Labour politician, chairman from 1964 to 1966 of the Greater London Council, and president from 1962 to 1971 of the School Journey Association, and member of the Robbins Committee.
- Anthony Todd (c. 1718 – 1798), foreign secretary of the Post Office
