= John McCabe (composer) =

English composer and pianist

McCabe in 2012

John McCabe CBE (21 April 1939 – 13 February 2015) was a British composer and pianist. He created works in many different forms, including symphonies, ballets, and solo works for the piano. He served as director of the London College of Music from 1983 to 1990. Guy Rickards praised him as "one of Britain's finest composers in the past half-century" and "a pianist of formidable gifts and wide-ranging sympathies".

== Early life and education ==
McCabe was born in Huyton, Liverpool on 21 April 1939. His father was an Irish physicist and his German/Finnish mother, Elisabeth Herlitzius, was an amateur violinist. McCabe was badly burned in an accident when he was a child and was home schooled for eight years. During this time, McCabe said that there was "a lot of music in the house", which inspired his future career. He explained "My mother was a very good amateur violinist and there were records and printed music everywhere. I thought that if all these guys – Beethoven, Brahms, Schubert – can do it, then so can I!". By the age of 11 McCabe had composed 13 symphonies, but he later suppressed them, believing they were not good enough. He subsequently attended the Liverpool Institute.

== Personal life ==
He married Monica Smith, a former head of the Sittingbourne Music Society, in 1974. In December 2012 McCabe was diagnosed with a brain tumour. He continued to compose music during his treatment.

John McCabe died after the unsuccessful long cancer treatment on 13 February 2015.

== Career ==
=== Composer ===
McCabe began studying composition with British composers Humphrey Procter-Gregg at Manchester University and with Thomas Pitfield at the Royal Manchester College of Music (now the Royal Northern College), and later, in 1964, at the Munich Hochschule für Musik he continued studying composition with German composer Harald Genzmer and others. He embarked upon a career as both a composer and a virtuoso pianist. Guy Rickards considers McCabe's early works to have been overlooked because he was perceived as a pianist rather than a composer. One of his early successes was the orchestral song cycle Notturni ed Alba, soprano and orchestra (1970), based on a set of poems in medieval Latin about the theme of night, which was described as "an intoxicating creation, full of tingling atmosphere and slumbering passion". The Chagall Windows (1974) is a closely argued symphonic work in 12 sections, each depicting one of Marc Chagall's stained-glass windows in Jerusalem. His Concerto for Orchestra (1982) brought him international recognition.

But it was not until the 1990s that he came to be viewed primarily as a composer, with the successes of the piano scoreTenebrae (1992–93), which marked the deaths in 1992 of musicians Sir Charles Groves, William Mathias and Stephen Oliver, and was written for Barry Douglas; his 4th symphony, Of Time and the River (1993–94); and his third ballet Edward II (1995), which permitted David Bintley's choreography to win the 1998 TMA/Barclays Theatre Award for Outstanding Achievement in Dance.

He worked in almost every genre, though large-scale forms lie at the heart of his catalogue with seven symphonies, two dozen concertante works and eight ballet scores to his name. His numerous concerti include four for his own instrument, the piano (1966–76), three for one or two violins (1959, 1980, 2003) as well as for viola (1962), Metamorphoses, harpsichord and orchestra (1968), oboe d'amore (1972), clarinet (1977), orchestra (1982), trumpet (1987) and flute (1990), and double concertos for viola and cello (1965) and clarinet and oboe (1988). His chamber works include seven string quartets, the third of which (1979) was inspired by the landscape of the Lake District. His solo instrumental music was mainly written for the piano; he composed 13 studies for the instrument, including Gaudí (1970), inspired by the Catalan architect; Mosaic (1980), inspired by Islamic art; and a series of seven (2000–9) each explicitly drawing inspiration from a different composer. Other significant piano works include the Haydn Variations (1983), written to commemorate the 250th anniversary of Joseph Haydn's birth.

McCabe's style evolved gradually from an initial lyrical constructivism through a serialist phase, with a fascination with repetitive patterns leading to a more complex combination of processes to achieve more subtle forms of continuity. Rickards states that his influences included Vaughan Williams, Britten, Tippett and Karl Amadeus Hartmann, and he was also influenced by non-classical music including rock and jazz.

He had a long-lasting association with the Presteigne Festival, an annual classical music event held in Powys County, Wales. He was also commissioned by the Chamber Music Society of Lincoln Center to compose Rainforest I in 1984.

=== Pianist ===
McCabe first became known as a pianist. His repertoire was wide, from pre-classical to modern composers. He specialised in 20th century music, particularly in English composers. He performed the UK premiere of John Corigliano's Piano Concerto. He also specialised in the music of Haydn, with Gramophone Magazine praising McCabe's 1970s-era recording of Haydn's piano sonatas as "definitive" and "one of the great recorded monuments of the keyboard repertoire".

He recorded several CDs with the cellist Julian Lloyd Webber.

=== Teacher and administrator ===
From 1965 to 1968 McCabe was pianist‐in‐residence at Cardiff University. Later, he served as principal of the London College of Music from 1983 to 1990, where his efforts to enhance the college's profile resulted in its merging with Thames Valley University (currently University of West London) in 1991.

He also held visiting professorships at the universities of Melbourne, Australia, and Cincinnati, United States, during the 1990s. Among his notable pupils is Canadian composer Gary Kulesha.

=== Author ===
McCabe wrote guides to the music of Haydn, Bartók and Rachmaninoff, and a book on contemporary English composer Alan Rawsthorne. A compilation of his letters to performers and other composers, compiled by his wife Monica, was published in 2024.

== Awards ==
- 1985 – Appointed a Commander of the Order of the British Empire (CBE) for his services to British music.
- 2003 – Recipient of The Distinguished Musician Award from the Incorporated Society of Musicians.
- 2006 – Awarded an Honorary Doctorate in Music from the University of Liverpool.
- 2014 – Won the Classical Music Award at the 59th Ivor Novello Awards.

== Key works ==
- Three Folk Songs, Op. 19 (1963; soprano, clarinet, piano)
- Variations on a theme by Karl Amadeus Hartmann (1964; orchestra)
- Symphony No. 1, Elegy (1965; orchestra)
- Notturni ed Alba (1970; soprano, orchestra)
- Symphony No. 2 (1971; orchestra)
- Chagall Windows (1974; orchestra)
- Piano Concerto No. 3 (1977)
- Symphony No. 3, Hommages (1978; orchestra)
- Images (1978; brass band)
- Magnificat in C (1979)
- String Quartet No. 3 (1979)
- Concerto for Orchestra (1982)
- String Quartet No. 4 (1982)
- Cloudcatcher Fells (1982; brass band)
- Haydn Variations (1983; piano; dedicated to and premiered by Philip Fowke)
- Fire at Durilgai (1988; orchestra)
- String Quartet No. 5 (1989)
- Flute Concerto (1990)
- Tenebrae (1993; piano)
- Salamander (1994; brass band)
- Symphony No. 4, Of Time and the River (1994; orchestra)
- Edward II (1995; ballet)
- Pilgrim (1998; double string orchestra)
- Arthur Parts 1 & 2 (1999 and 2001; ballet)
- Woman by the Sea (2001; piano, string quartet)
- The Maunsell Forts (2002; brass band)
- Labyrinth [Symphony No.7] (2007; orchestra)
- Piano Sonata (Hommage to Tippett) (2009)
- Horn Quintet (2010–11)
- Clarinet Quintet (2010–11)
- String Quartet No. 6 (2011) Silver Nocturnes
- String Quartet No. 7 (2012) Summer Eves

== Recordings ==
- Twentieth Century Piano Music – Pye Records GSGC 14116 (1969)
- Dance Prelude for Oboe d'Amore and Piano – Amoris Edition AR 1003 – written for Jennifer Paull (1972)
- Symphony 'Of Time and the River'; Flute Concerto – Hyperion CDA67089 (1999)
- String Quartets Nos. 3, 4 and 5 – Vanbrugh Quartet Hyperion CDA67078 (1999)
- Edward II – Hyperion CDA 67135/6 (2000)
- Star Preludes performed by Peter Sheppard Skærved (violin) and Tamami Honma (piano) – Métier MSVCD 92029 (2001)
- Tenebrae: Piano Music by John McCabe performed by Tamami Honma – Métier MSVCD 92071 (2003)
- Six Minute Symphony; Concertante Variations of Nicholas Maw; Piano Concerto No 2; Sonata on a Motet – Dutton CDLX 7133 (2003)
- Two Pianos: works by Stravinsky, McPhee, McCabe, Copland, Britten and Athanasiadis, performed by John McCabe and Tamami Honma (pianos) – Dutton CDSA 6881 (2005)
- McCabe: Concerto for Orchestra & The Chagall Windows; Arnold: Philharmonic Concerto – London Philharmonic Orchestra LPO 0023 (2021)
- Symphonies 2 & 3 and Cello Concerto – Raphael Wallfisch, BBC Scottish Symphony Orchestra, Kenneth Woods, Signum Classics, SIGCD 1007 (2026)

== Writings ==
- Bartok Orchestral Music, BBC Music Guides (1974)
- Rachmaninov, Novello Short Biographies (1974)
- Haydn: Piano Sonatas, BBC Music Guides (1986)
- Alan Rawsthorne: Portrait of a Composer (Oxford University Press; 1999) ISBN 0-19-816693-1
- So Written to After-Times: John McCabe – A Life in Letters, compiled by Monica McCabe (2024)

== Sources ==
- Beale, Catherine. 2010. A Festival History Presteigne Festival website (accessed 20 January 2019).
- Craggs, Stewart R. 1991. John McCabe: A Bio-Bibliography. Bio-Bibliographies in Music, no. 32. Westport: Greenwood Press. ISBN 0-313-26445-7.
- Foreman, Ronald Lewis Edmund (ed.). 1975. British Music Now: A Guide to the Work of Younger Composers. London: Elek.
- Larner, Gerald. 1969. "The Lion, the Witch and the Wardrobe". The Musical Times 110, no. 1514 (April): 372.
- Matthew-Walker, Robert. 1999. "John McCabe at 60". Musical Opinion 122, no. 1417 (Spring): 138–39.
- Odam, George (ed.). 2008. Landscapes of the Mind: The Music of John McCabe, with a foreword by Vernon Handley. Guildhall School of Music & Drama Research Studies, no. 6. London: Guildhall School of Music and Drama. ISBN 978-0-7546-5816-0.
- Rickards, Guy. 1999. "The Piano and John McCabe". British Music: The Journal of the British Music Society 21:35–47.
- Rickards, Guy. 2001. 'McCabe, John', in Grove Music Online.
