= Janet Taylor =

English astronomer and navigation expert

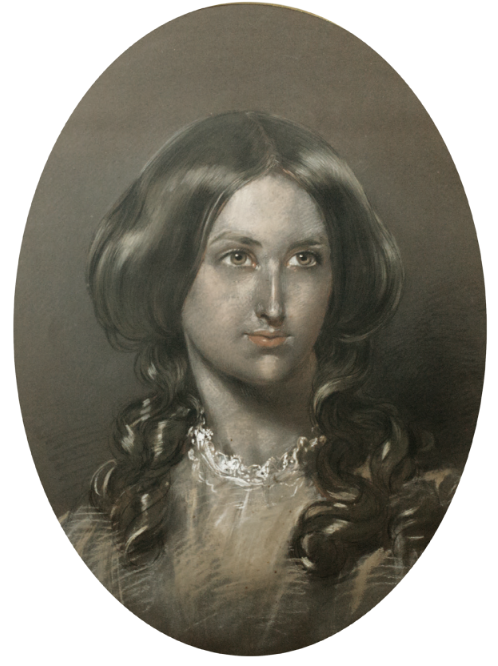
- Born: Jane Ann Ionn; 13 May 1804; England
- Died: 25 January 1870 (aged 65)
- Occupations: teacher of navigation, writer and instrument maker
- Known for: English astronomer and navigation expert
- Spouse: George Taylor (Jane)
- Children: 8 and 3 step-children

Janet Taylor (born Jane Ann Ionn; 13 May 1804 – 25 January 1870) was an English astronomer, navigation expert, mathematician, meteorologist, and founder of the George Taylor Nautical Academy. She was the author of various astronomy and navigation works, and owner of a navigational instrument production and repair warehouse.

Her "George Taylor Nautical Academy" was highly regarded by the East India Company, Trinity House, and the Admiralty. She received medals from both the King of Prussia and King of the Netherlands, and her rule for calculating latitude from altitude was described as "ingenious". Taylor was among the few women working as a scientific instrument designer in 19th century London. Her 1834 patented "Mariner's Calculator" was dismissed by the Admiralty, and was later reassessed as "genius but impractical in the 'clumsy' hands of its potential users."

== Early life ==
Taylor was born Jane Ann Ionn in Wolsingham, England, on 13 May 1804. Her parents were Reverend Peter Ionn and Jane Deighton, and she was their sixth child of eight. Her father was the headmaster of a Wolsingham School, which she attended, and which was one of the few Northern English schools to teach navigation.

At nine years old, she received a scholarship to attend Phoebe Wright's Royal School for female embroiderers in Ampthill, Bedfordshire, which had an entry age of fourteen. Queen Charlotte was the school's patron and she waived the age requirement in her case.

When her father died, Taylor invested her inheritance into a career in the male-dominated field of nautical education. In 1821, she began managing the finances of her older brother's business. On 30 January 1830, she married George Taylor Jane in the Netherlands and became a stepmother of three children. The marriage took place at the British ambassador's house in The Hague and they both changed their last name to Taylor. They were to have eight more children together and six survived their early lives.

== Achievements ==
Taylor opened the George Taylor Nautical Academy in 1833 with her husband. During this time she published "Luni-Solar and Horary Tables: with their application in nautical astronomy; containing an easy and correct method of finding the longitude, by lunar observations and chronometers; the latitude, by double altitudes and elapsed time, the azimuth, amplitude, and true time," which discussed calculations that could "reduce the lunar distance" using a formula she derived herself.

In 1834, she received a patent for her "Mariner's Calculator". The invention was not adopted by the British Royal Navy as it was deemed "unworthy for the Lordships Patronage" by the Admiralty. Later, she published a second edition of "Principles of Navigation Simplified", however she faced financial difficulties following its release and her invention's failure.

Around mid-1835, she had a child. After improving her lunar distance formula, she published the second edition of Luni-Solar and Horary Tables. She owed much of this success to Francis Beaufort, who helped push for the acceptance of her work by the Naval establishment.

=== Luni-Solar and Horary Tables ===
This was Taylor's first published book, in 1833. It was specifically meant to simplify the calculations of astronomical navigation by using the moon instead of the sun as one's point of reference. There was a lot of discussion around finding the best way to calculate longitude while at sea.

Luni-Solar and Horary Tables became a great success, due to Taylor's discovery proving that the earth is spheroidal rather than spherical. She uses "he" instead of "her" to refer to herself throughout the book, because of how male-dominated her field was.

Taylor dedicated this book to King William IV, who offered her a job as an educator for nobility.

In 1833 the first edition of Luni-Solar and Horary Tables was reviewed in The United Service Journal, The Atlas, and The Morning Advertiser. These positive reviews urged young mariners to use this as their basis of studying. In 1834, Taylor published a shorter version of Luni-Solar and Horary Tables called The Principles of Navigation Simplified: with Luni-Solar and horary tables, and their application in Nautical Astronomy.

In 1835, after getting a grant from the Admiralty, Trinity House, and East India Company, Taylor published the second edition of Luni-solar and Horary Tables; by 1854 this book was in its seventh and last edition. Taylor published a second book, An Epitome of Navigation, and Nautical Astronomy, with the Improved Lunar Tables, in 1842. This ran to twelve editions by 1859.

=== Mrs. Janet Taylor's Nautical Academy and Navigation Warehouse ===
After the second edition of her book, Luni-Solar and Horary Tables, came out in 1835, and with steady income from her first nautical academy, Taylor was able to open a second academy in late 1835. By this time, Taylor was recognised as a credible mathematician and entrepreneur. Mrs. Janet Taylor's Nautical Academy and Navigation Warehouse offered training in all subjects a mariner would need: "a complete course on Navigation, including Trigonometry, and its application to Navigation. Another course was Algebra, Geometry, Physical Geography in relation to the velocity of tides, waves, etc. Mechanics including the Composition of Forces, Mechanical powers, the Laws of Motion, the strength of strain, of materials; wind, rain, steam powers, Atmospheric and Oceanic Phenomena... and so it continued....".

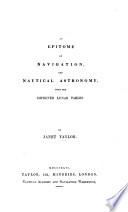
An Epitome of Navigation and Nautical Astronomy with the Improved Lunar Tables, by Jane Taylor in print from 1842 to 1859

During the late 1830s and 40s, her academies were advertised in the Shipping and Mercantile Gazette and the London Shipping Gazette.

Taylor's second academy had a positive impact on the young English mariners, and the expansion of her second nautical academy was endorsed by organisations including the Admiralty, the Trinity House, and the East India Company. This expansion allowed her to house pupils who would not otherwise have been able to attend.

== Inventions ==
Taylor was an instrument maker, and established herself as such. The first advertisements for her own chronometers appeared in 1838. After her discovery that the Earth was spheroidal, Taylor would create and adjust compasses, sextants, binnacles, and other nautical tools to keep up with this new discovery and the principles that came with it.

The Mariner's compass, while not endorsed by the Admiralty, could be considered Taylor's "most notable" invention.

In 1850, Taylor developed and designed a quintant for the Prince of Wales, who would later become King Edward VII. This was specifically made for royalty with space at the bottom for Prince Edward's three-feathered family crest. A year later, Prince Albert hosted the Great Exhibition of 1851, as which Taylor presented her "bronze binnacle, with compass, designed from the water lily."

For three years following the Great Exhibition of 1851, Taylor continued to develop more binnacles, by performing experiments consisting of swinging ships back and forth across the Thames and recording the compass actions. She explained these results in a letter to astronomer George Biddell Airy in 1854.

In 1856, Taylor invented another nautical instrument consisting of an attachment for sextants and quadrants, called sea artificial horizon.

In 1862, Taylor presented a new sextant and mariner's compass at the 1862 London International Exhibition of Industry and Art.

== Later life ==
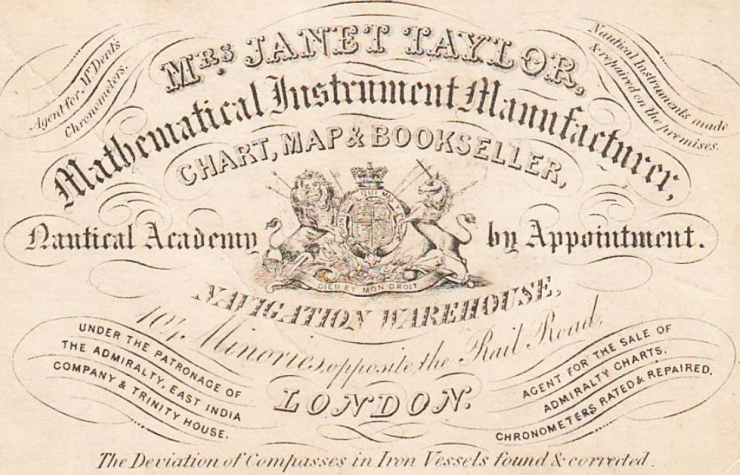
Janet Taylor's 1850 trade card

Taylor's husband died in 1853. From 1860, Taylor began receiving an annual Civil List pension of £50. The academy later rebranded to Mrs Janet Taylor and Co. In 1863, she published the sixth edition of Directions to the Planisphere of the Stars, but declared bankruptcy the following year. She left London in 1866. She contracted bronchitis, and died on 26 January 1870 aged 65. Her death certificate states her occupation as "Teacher of Navigation".

== Works ==
- Lunar Tables for Calculating Distances
- Luni-Solar and Horary Tables
- Principles of Navigation Simplified
- Epitome of Navigation
- Directions to the Planisphere of the Stars, With Introductory Remarks on The Stellar and Planetary Systems
