= Sunniside =

Sunniside is a common name for villages in historic County Durham:

- Sunniside, Gateshead
- Sunniside, Sunderland
- Sunniside, Weardale
