= Tamami Honma =

American pianist and recording artist

Tamami Honma is a Japanese-American concert pianist, chamber musician, educator and recording artist. In 2024, she became the first female pianist to record the complete cycle of 35 Beethoven piano sonatas, released as a 10-CD set by Divine Art Recordings. She is an advocate for 20th and 21st-century repertoire, having premiered and recorded works by several British and Lithuanian composers. She serves on the music faculties at Stanford University and Santa Clara University.

== Education and early history ==
Honma studied with Byron Janis, one of the few students of Vladimir Horowitz, at the Manhattan School of Music where she earned a bachelor's degree in piano performance. She subsequently studied with Christopher Elton at the Royal Academy of Music in London, earning a master's degree, and joined the academy's academic faculty; she was later awarded an honorary ARAM degree.

Early in her career, she won first prize at several national and international piano competitions, including the Stravinsky Awards International Piano Competition (1987) in Champaign–Urbana, Illinois, the Yamaha Competition at the MTNA (Music Teachers National Association), winning the Southwest Division in Albuquerque, New Mexico, in January 1990 and the national final later that year in Little Rock, Arkansas, the Gina Bachauer International Young Artists Piano Competition (1990) in Salt Lake City, Utah, and the Kingsville (Isabel Scionti) International Young Performers Competition (1991) in Kingsville, Texas. She has also appeared as a soloist at Bolshoi Hall in Moscow with the Moscow Radio Symphony Orchestra.

== Contemporary music advocacy ==
Honma maintained a long-standing collaboration with composer John McCabe. In 2001, she released Star Preludes (Metier), featuring her performance of McCabe's title work alongside violinist Peter Sheppard Skærved. In 2002, she gave the world premiere of McCabe's solo piano study Scrunch at Weill Recital Hall in New York; Allan Kozinn of The New York Times wrote that she "negotiated the work's thickets easily and produced an eloquent, powerful performance". On November 28, 2003, she premiered McCabe's "Snowfall in Winter" — like Scrunch, a study dedicated to her — at St John's Smith Square in London; reviewing the concert for The Independent, Robert Maycock wrote that she "played with both flair and immediate understanding". That same year, she released a recording of McCabe's Piano Concerto No. 2 (Sinfonia Concertante) with the St. Christopher Chamber Orchestra (Dutton Digital). This partnership culminated in the 2005 recording Two Pianos (Dutton Digital), on which she performed alongside the composer. She contributed the chapter "The Piano Music" to Landscapes of the Mind: The Music of John McCabe (2008), a collection of essays on the composer edited by George Odam. In 2006, she performed piano duets by Alan Rawsthorne and Constant Lambert with McCabe on his recording of Rawsthorne's complete solo piano music (Dutton Digital), which received a Gold Star rating from Gramophone. Beyond McCabe's music, she has also premiered and recorded music by British composer Nigel Clarke on the album Premonitions (2002).

Honma has also been a prominent advocate of Lithuanian music. On October 2, 2003, she made her Wigmore Hall solo recital début, in a program including the world premiere of Cascades-3 by Lithuanian composer Osvaldas Balakauskas; her recording of the work appeared the following year on the compilation Zoom In 3: New Music from Lithuania. At the St John's Smith Square concert that November, she also premiered an arrangement made for her by Lithuanian composer Anatolijus Šenderovas of his percussion work No moon, no flowers, no friend – and he drinks sake. By decree of President Valdas Adamkus of January 10, 2006, Honma was awarded the Medal of the Order of the Lithuanian Grand Duke Gediminas.

In June 2017, Honma was the soloist in the world premiere of a piano concerto by Luis Andrei Cobo, written in collaboration with her, performed with the Cambrian Symphony; the performance was voted "Best New Music Performance" in San Francisco Classical Voice's 2016–17 Best of the Bay readers' poll. Her performance of Beethoven concertos with the Cal Arte Ensemble made her a finalist for Best Instrumental Recital Performance in the following year's poll.

In October 2023, Honma performed Busoni's Piano Concerto (1904) with the Saratoga Symphony. The massive, rarely performed work lasts over an hour and is among the most demanding in the piano repertoire; the San Francisco Symphony had given its first performances of the concerto only a few months earlier.

== Major recording projects ==
Honma's 2008 recording of Chopin's Piano Concertos Nos. 1 and 2 (SOMM), performed in a chamber arrangement with the Vilnius String Quartet, was named The Observer's CD of the week; critic Stephen Pritchard wrote that Honma "plays exquisitely" and called the recording "a complete delight".

In 2024, Honma completed a multi-year project to record all 35 of Beethoven's piano sonatas for the Divine Art label, following the ABRSM critical edition edited by Barry Cooper and presenting the sonatas in broadly chronological order. The recordings grew out of a "Beethoven Odyssey" Honma began in February 2016, in which she performed the cycle of 32 piano sonatas in concert along with the ten violin sonatas, the five piano concertos and the Choral Fantasy. Most recorded cycles include only the 32 sonatas to which Beethoven assigned opus numbers; Honma's set also includes the three early Kurfürstensonaten, making it one of very few complete recordings of all 35. Reviewing the set in Fanfare, Jerry Dubins described the cycle as "transcendental", comparing aspects of Honma's playing to interpreters including Alfred Brendel, Wilhelm Kempff, Vladimir Ashkenazy and Maurizio Pollini. Writing in International Piano, Guy Rickards praised the consistency of Honma's interpretations across the cycle, noting that "the strengths of Honma's interpretations of the earlier works persist to the end, whether in the lyrical warmth of Op 90's finale or the stratospheric heights of the final three." Honma was also the subject of a lengthy profile and interview in Fanfare by Marc Medwin, discussing her artistic development and approach to the Beethoven Sonatas. In a separate review, Medwin contrasted her approach with Brendel's, describing the cycle as "remarkably complete and endlessly rewarding".

Honma has also written on Beethoven interpretation: her article "Performance Practice in Beethoven: Tempo Modifications and the Role of the Performer in the Creative Process", appeared in Arietta, the journal of the Beethoven Piano Society of Europe, in 2000.

== Discography ==
Year	Album Title	Label	Collaborators
2024	Beethoven: The Complete 35 Piano Sonatas (10-CD set)	Divine Art	
2008	Chopin: Piano Concertos Nos. 1 & 2 (Chamber Version)	SOMM	Vilnius String Quartet
2006	Alan Rawsthorne: Complete Piano Music	Dutton Digital	John McCabe
2005	Two Pianos	Dutton Digital	John McCabe
2004	Zoom In 3: New Music from Lithuania (compilation)	Music Information Centre Lithuania	
2003	John McCabe: Piano Concerto No. 2 (Sinfonia Concertante)	Dutton Digital	St. Christopher Chamber Orchestra
2003	John McCabe: Tenebrae; Sonata; Evening Harmonies	Metier	
2002	Nigel Clarke: Premonitions	Metier	Peter Sheppard Skærved, Janne Thomsen
2001	Star Preludes (Works by Alan Rawsthorne and John McCabe)	Metier	Peter Sheppard Skærved, Christine Sohn
2001	Mozart: Sonatas for Violin and Piano	Metier	Howard Davis
1998	Chopin: Solo Favorites for Piano	DK Music	
