= Edward Cowie =

English composer, author, natural scientist, and painter

Edward Cowie (born 17 August 1943) is an Australian composer, author, natural scientist, and painter.

== Life ==
Edward Cowie was born in England in 1943, and spent most of his early life in the rural countryside of Suffolk and then the Cotswolds. This first-hand experience of nature was to have a profound influence on his life and work. In 1964, he began composition studies with Alexander Goehr and in 1971 he won a Chopin Fellowship to study with Witold Lutosławski in Poland. He also came under the influence of Michael Tippett, who remained a close friend and mentor.

Early recognition came with the 1975 BBC Proms commission Leviathan for large orchestra, and this was followed by a string of festival commissions and recordings. Major works from this period include Gesangbuch (1975-6), the Piano Concerto (1976-7) and Concerto for Orchestra (1982), as well as the opera Commedia (1976-7).

In 1983, Cowie was awarded the first Granada Composer Fellowship with the Royal Liverpool Philharmonic Orchestra. He remained with the orchestra for three years and worked with them as both composer and conductor. He subsequently worked as a conductor with several major orchestras and ensembles in Britain and Australia. Among works from this time are the Clarinet Concerto (1978), Choral Symphony (1983), Atlas (1986), Cello Concerto (1993, revised 2003) and several pieces inspired by the Australian folk-hero Ned Kelly.

In 1995, after twelve years in Australia he returned to England to live. Cowie returned to Australia to live in 2023 and now lives and works in Armidale, NSW

== Music ==
Cowie's appointment as the first Composer in Association with the BBC Singers (2002-6) saw the completion of some of his most complex and inventive scores, including Gaia (2002), an hour-long creation epic inspired by the writings of James Lovelock and National Portraits, shortlisted for the 2007 British Composer, Radio 3 Listeners' Award. In May 2010 the third part (Spring) of Four Seasons for a cappella choir, a joint commission by CC21 in London and Commotio in Oxford, received its premiere. The conductor, Howard Williams, has premiered many of Cowie's works. His 24 Preludes were released on UHR Label in 2008 to critical acclaim. This was followed by the release of his Magma Psalm for Harp and Wind Quartet on NMC label in March, 2010. His Rutherford's Lights, a massive cycle of 24 pieces for solo piano has just been recorded on UHR label with Richard Casey as the pianist and was released in the early autumn, 2010. It was described as 'an epic achievement' in International Piano Magazine in February 2010. The Rutherford cycle was followed by his 'Particle Partita for solo Violin', a set of 8 sort pieces that trace the time-line in the history of particle physics. Collaborating first with physicist Sir Michael Berry FRS on the Rutherford Cycle, the Particle Partita was a collaboration between Cowie and particle physicist Professor Brian Foster FRS of Oxford University and CERN.

A new collaboration has begun with Sir Michael Berry on an Oboe Quintet, 'The Colours of Dark Light', and will be premiered in the 2013/14 season with the Coull Quartet and Christopher Redgate.2013 saw celebrations of Cowie's 70th birthday with a BBC Prom commission, 'Earth Music 1' premiered by the BBC Philharmonic under Noseda. There was also a Proms Portrait Concert in the RCM and a special birthday-tribute concert given for him by the BBC Singers.

The new Signum Classics release of Cowie's 'Gesangbuch' and other choral/instrumental works was received with critical acclaim as was Earth Music 1. The Kreutzer Quartet released the first in a series of recordings of Cowie's String Quartets, the first being quartets 3-5 and on the NMC Label. Cowie's connection with the renowned Kreutzer Quartet has led to the composition of a 6th and 7th Quartets. The Kreutzers have now recorded all of his quartets from 1 to 6. The quarters have been received to great critical acclaim. Cowie signed with Metier Divine Arts in 2019. This company is committed to an ongoing series of portrait recordings of his music. Recent recordings have been his epic cycle of ‘ Bird Portraits’ (24 British Birds), for violin and piano, and a second bird cycle, ‘Where Song was Born’, devoted to Australian Birds and for flute and piano. 2021/22 saw the release of a second ‘bird portrait’ cycle, inspired by Australian Birds: Where Song was Born for Flute(s) and Piano- a release that earned high praise internationally. The third ‘birds’ cycle, ‘Where the Wood Thrush forever Sings’, inspired by birds of the USA, for clarinet(s) and piano was released in September and has already attracted rave reviews. The fourth cycle, ‘Because they have Songs’ - African birds, was recorded in September, 2023 and is scheduled for release on Metier Divine Arts in early 2024. Further recordings in celebration of the composer’s 80th birthday are ‘The Kreutzer Effect’ including four portrait solo pieces for members of The Kreutzer Quartet and includes Cowie’s 7th String Quartet. His three new piano sonatas, ‘Rock Music 1-3’ are also being recorded in October 2023- all recordings to be released on Metier Divine Arts. In October, Cowie is to make his first CD as performer in a duo recording with the eminent Australian flautist, Laura Chislett.

In recent years Cowie has composed an ever increasing number of works fur soloists, duos and chamber groups. Many leading international musicians are performing his music.

Recently hailed as ‘considered by many to be the greatest living composer directly inspired by the Natural World’, he continues to compose more vigorously than ever. He is married to Australian visual artist, Heather Cowie. After 28 years living in the UK, Cowie has returned to live and work in Australia permanently. His new home is in Armidale, in The New England Tablelands of NSW.

== Academic appointments ==
1973-83 Associate Professor of Composition, University of Lancaster
. 1979 Guest Professor, University of Kassel
1978 Visiting professor, University of Florida
1983-88 Professor and Head of the School of Creative Arts at the University of Wollongong, Australia
1989-94 Professor and Director of the Australian Arts Fusion Centre at James Cook University, Townsville
1996 -2008 Professor and Director of Research at Dartington College of Arts in Devon. 2013 Awarded a Leverhulme Emeritus Research Fellowship for 2013-2015 for research towards two new orchestral works in the 'Earth Music' series and will include funded research trips to Africa and California in late 2014 and mid 2015

== Musical style and influences ==
In addition to his lifelong fascination with landscape and the natural world, Cowie has acknowledged the influence on his music of the works of J.S. Bach, Haydn, Janáček, Debussy, Sibelius and Messiaen. His mature style combines elements of impressionism with intricate part-writing, intense lyrical expressiveness, tonal fluidity and rhythmic complexity. Cowie acknowledges these earlier influences whilst at the same time stressing a continued journey of exploration of new musical forms, especially those that can be discovered by a fusion of music with structural and behavioural materials derived from and inspired by both the natural sciences and physics.

In recent times, Cowie has increasingly turned to acts of drawing and painting, in an addition to theoretical research, as primers for his music. Not having composed for orchestra for several years, he has also commenced the first of a large set of short works for large orchestra, called 'Earth Music'. He feels that the lengthy and weighty dialectic approach to earlier large-scale orchestral works, should now give way to a form of synthesis and compression, where the sensation of the music is intensified by brevity.

Returning to writing for large orchestral forces in 2012, Cowie has commenced a major series of short orchestral works, none lasting more than 9'. This cycle, to be titled 'Earth Music' will open with a BBC Prom Commission for 2013 (the composer's 70th birthday year). Cowie has stated that I want to work with brevity in time but with great concentration and event. I have come to realise that some of our most intense experiences of (for example), the natural world, last for something around a minute or less in their most dynamic form. In removing myself from some previously practised lengthy dialectical formalism, I am going to try to engage with synthesis and compression in order to increase the sensual impact of the music. During and following the Covid Pandemic, Cowie embarked on a massive series of duo and solo and chamber works.

He acknowledges that his musical style continues to evolve but that his chosen method of preparation for music by means of drawing will continue to form the basic and foundational impulse driving his musical imagination.

== Painting and writing ==
Alongside his rise to prominence as a musician, Cowie has exhibited internationally as a painter, and his works are in public and private collections in more than 20 countries. He has also made several television films, including his acclaimed BBC2 film on Leonardo, of 1986. In 1988 and 1989, he wrote and presented two major radio series commissioned by ABCFM, Australia. In 2002 he was created the first Artist in Residence with the Royal Society for the Protection of Birds. In that same year, he became the first Composer in Association with the BBC Singers in London; a collaboration that spawned three major new works in the genre. During the late 1990s, he worked as an author of books on wildlife and the first in a major series, Birds Talk, was published in 2001.

During 2012, Cowie has commenced a major series of oil paintings on a large scale, both being a series devoted to water, the second set especially focussing on The Great Barrier Reef and which will form the structural framework for the first in his new series of orchestral works, 'Earth Music'.

In 2014, Cowie returned to Radio Broadcasting with a commission from ABC Radio National, Australia with a commission to present a programme on the relationships between drawing and music. 'Drawing towards Music'. As a result of its broadcast in May 2014, he is to write and present further programmes for ABC Radio National in 2015. ‘The Singing Planet’, a two part series about the natural history of song, was broadcast on ABC Earshot in 2015.

== Selected works ==
=== Orchestral ===
- The Moon, Sea and Stars (1973)
- Leviathan (1975)
- Piano Concerto (1976)
- Columbine (1978)
- Leonardo (1982)(New Version 2012)
- Concerto for orchestra (1982)(Revised 2012)
- Clarinet Concerto (1983)
- Choral Symphony (1983)
- Symphony - The American (1983)
- Fifteen Minute Australia (1984)
- Atlas (1986)
- Cello Concerto (1993, revised 2003)
- Elysium I-III (1996)
- Oboe Concerto (1978)
- From Moment to Moment (2000)
- Dark Matter (2003)
- Earth Music 1- The Great Barrier Reef for large orchestra (2012/13)
- Clarinet Concerto (no3) Ruskin's Dreams-Coniston (2014)
- Piano Concerto no 2- Snow Canyon, Utah (2014)
- ‘’ Tide in Knots Concert Overture for Orchestra. (2017) ‘’
- ‘’ Violin Concerto with Winds, Brass and Percussion ‘GAD’ (2018/19)’’
- ‘’ Harp Concerto ‘La Primavera’ with String Orchestra. (2019/20)’’

=== Chamber music ===
- String Quartet 1(1974)
- Cathedral Music (1976)
- String Quartet 2 (1978)
- Endymion Nocturnes for Tenor and String Quartet (1980)
- Harlequin for solo Harp (1980)
- Kelly Passacaglia for String Quartet (1981)
- Kelly Variations for solo Piano (1981)
- Kelly-Nolan-Kelly for solo Clarinent in A (1981)
- String Quartet 3 (1983)
- String Quartet 4 (1984)
- Voices of the Land for Violin and Piano (1987)
- Mount Keira Duets for Flute and Guitar (1987)
- Coburn Partita for solo Cello (1991)
- Violin Sonata (1991)
- 48 Books 1 & 2 for 7 instruments (1994)
- Songs without words (1995)
- The Voices of Gaia for 2v voices and 18 instruments (1998)
- Night Owls (1999)
- Four Frames in a Row for 6 Baroque Instruments (2000)
- The Healing of Saul for Violin and Piano (2000)
- Badlands Gold for Tuba and Piano (2000)
- The Rising of the Sun and Setting of the Same (2001)
- Kandinsky for Four Guitars (2003)
- Blue Blues for solo Marimba (2003)
- Orpheus with Lyre Bird for solo Harp (2004)
- H.J.Rhapsodies solo saxophone and chamber orchestra (2004)
- Birdsong Bagatelles (2004)
- 24 Preludes for solo piano (2005)
- Piano Trio (2005)
- Le Gorge du Tarn (2007)
- Spell Checks for Guitar and Flute (2007)
- Chansons d'Automne (2007)
- Psappha Portraits for 7 instruments (2006/7)
- Nympheas for Four Harps (2007)
- Rutherford's Lights for solo Piano (2008)
- INhabitAT for 22 instruments (2011/12)
- Blue Blues for solo Marimba (2011)
- String Quartet no 5, Birdsong Bagatelles (2008)
- Particle Partita for Solo Violin (2012)
- String Quartet no 6 'The Four Winds' (2012/13)
- ‘’String Quartet no 7 ‘Western Australia’ (2016/17)
- ‘’ String Quartets 8 and 9 ‘New York New York’ (2020)’’
- ‘’ String Octet ‘New York New York’ (Quartets 8 and 9 played simultaneously) (2020)
- ‘’ Bird Portraits. 24 Sonic Portraits of British Birds for violin and piano. (2020)
- ‘’ Where Song was Born. 24 Sonic Portraits of Birds of Australia for flute(s) and Piano. (2020/21)

=== Choral ===
- Gesangbuch for 24 voices and 11 instruments (1976)
- Madrigals or SATB Choir (1981)
- Kelly Choruses for 24 voices and solo Harp (1982)
- Gaia for 24 voices and 18 instruments (2002)
- Ave Maria or SATB Choir (2002)
- Lyrebird Motet for 24 Voices (2003)
- Lake Eacham Blues (2004)
- INhabitAT for 24 Voices and 21 instruments (2004)
- National Portraits for 24 solo Voices (2006)
- Bellbird Motet for SATB Choir (2011)
- Spitfires for SATB Choir and bells. (2013)
- Two African Motets for SATB choir and 2 Percussion. (2014)

=== Opera and music theatre ===
- Commedia (1977)
- KateKelly's Roadshow (1983)
