= Michael Alec Rose =

American classical composer

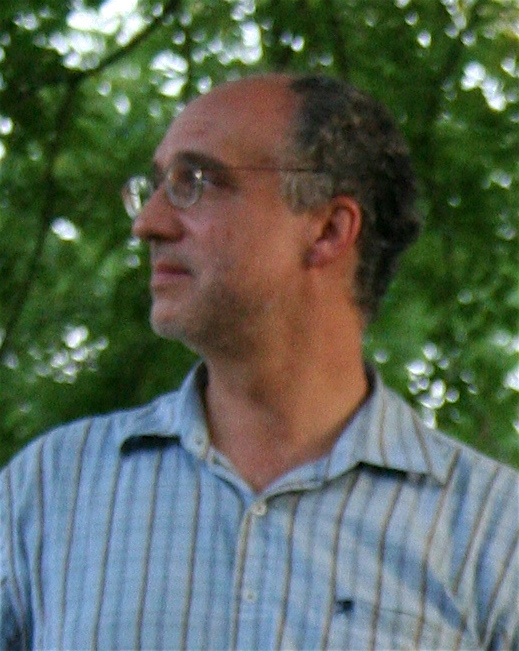
- Michael Alec Rose in 2007
- Born: September 9, 1959; Philadelphia, Pennsylvania
- Occupation: Composer of contemporary concert music

Michael Alec Rose (born 1959) is an American composer of chamber and symphonic music. He is Professor of Composition at Vanderbilt University’s Blair School of Music. His awards and commissions include the Walter W. Naumburg Foundation’s chamber music commission, for which he composed his String Quartet No. 2, premiered by the Meliora Quartet at Lincoln Center and the Library of Congress; a commission from the International Spoleto Festival for a violin-cello duo; twenty-five consecutive annual awards in composition from the American Society of Composers, Authors, and Publishers, 1986–2010; string quartet commissions from the Blair and Mendelssohn Quartets; and three commissioned performances by the Nashville Symphony, including Symphony No. 1—Paths of Peace (2000).

Rose’s Interferon, or Piano Concerto was performed by two orchestras in the Czech Republic in 2001. Two ballets commissioned by the Nashville Ballet were premiered in 2003–2004. The Pedagogy of Grief (Viola Sonata No. 3) was first performed at the Peabody Institute of Music, Baltimore, in 2005. Arguing with God: Concerto for Klezmer and Chamber Orchestra received its first performance in March 2007, by the Nashville Chamber Orchestra and Brave Old World, the Klezmer group. This concerto was the culminating event of that year's American Jewish Music Festival. Graces, Furies, commissioned for the Carolina Piano Trio, was premiered by them in three cities in North Carolina in May 2007, with further performances throughout the United States in 2008.

Rose is the co-founder and co-director of an international exchange program involving the Royal Academy of Music in London and Glasgow (RAM and RSAMD) and the Blair School of Music: "Collaborative Composition in London". He has twice visited RAM as Guest Composer, with performances of his music at various London sites. Several of his works have also been featured at the Tate St. Ives Gallery in Cornwall. Among the many new works commissioned for these U.K. performances are Hubbert Peak: Three Gas Stations for String Quartet and Dr. Johnson and Mr. Savage: Pantomime for Violinist and Cellist (both for members of the Kreutzer Quartet, in residence at RAM). Both these works were premiered in the spring of 2008 at London’s recently rediscovered Victorian vaudeville theatre, Wilton’s Music Hall. Other works by Rose sprung from the exchange program have been performed in Mexico, Kosovo, Macedonia, under the dome of St. Paul’s Cathedral, and in the Enlightenment Gallery of the British Museum. Rose’s Pastoral Concerto for Violin and Orchestra—commissioned by his exchange program co-director, violinist Peter Sheppard Skærved—was premiered with Sheppard Skærved as soloist and the Vanderbilt Orchestra, under the direction of Robin Fountain, in November 2008.

A further outgrowth of Rose’s exchange program work is The Periodic Table (Chamber Concerto for Piano and Eight Players), for pianist Aaron Shorr, Head of Keyboards at the RSAMD in Glasgow, where the concerto was premiered in June, 2009.

Two more works were premiered in Wiltons Music Hall in 2009: Everything Under the Sun: Four Seasons for Two Violins, and An Arch Never Sleeps for Violin and Double Bass, featuring virtuoso bassist Chi-chi Nwanoku. In 2010, Rose published Audible Signs: Essays from a Musical Ground (Continuum Books) and composed Five Bucolics for tenor Tony Boutté, a setting of poems by Maurice Manning.

Rose graduated from the University of Pennsylvania and studied with Pulitzer Prize-winning composers George Crumb and Richard Wernick, as well as with George Rochberg and Samuel Adler. Rose has won several major teaching awards at Vanderbilt, including the prestigious Chair of Teaching Excellence.

== Compositions ==
=== Orchestra ===
- Symphony No. 1—Paths of Peace (1999–2000), large orchestra, mezzo-soprano and baritone soloists, Suzuki string ensemble, 35 minutes.
- All Hallows (1997), large orchestra, 10 minutes.
- A Glimpse of River (1996), string orchestra, 4 minutes.
- Overture of the Open Road (1988), large orchestra, 9 minutes.
- Hopeful Monsters (2011), string orchestra, 7 minutes.

=== *Soloist(s) and Orchestra ===
- The Periodic Table—Piano Concerto No. 2 (2007), piano solo and eight players (2009).
- Pastoral Concerto (2008), violin solo and chamber orchestra, 24 minutes.
- Arguing with God (2006), concerto for klezmer musicians (4) and chamber orchestra, 34 minutes.
- Interferon, or Piano Concerto (2000–01), piano solo and large orchestra, 19 minutes.
- Viola Concerto (1984), viola solo and chamber orchestra, 22 minutes.

=== Works for 2–5 players ===
- An Arch Never Sleeps, for violin and double bass (2009), 6 minutes.
- Everything Under the Sun: Four Seasons for Two Violins (2009), 11 minutes.
- Hubbert Peak: Three Gas Stations for String Quartet (2007–08), 15 minutes.
- Dr. Johnson and Mr. Savage: Pantomime for Violinist and Cellist (2008), 6 minutes.
- Urstoff for violin and piano (2007).
- Graces, Furies for piano trio (2006), 10 minutes.
- The Doorway for English horn and piano (2006), 4 minutes.
- The Pedagogy of Grief—Third Viola Sonata (2004), viola and piano, 18 minutes.
- A Chance for the Soul for trombone and piano (2003).
- A Grammar of Hope: Quintet for Piano and Strings (2002–2003), 35 minutes.
- Eleusis: 15 Aspects of a Mystery for violin and piano (2000), 12 minutes.
- The Entire World: Three Jewish Songs from Eastern Europe, for flute, violin, and cello (1997), 7 minutes.
- String Quartet No. 4 (1996), 11 minutes.
- Farther Afield, fanfare for two horns and two trumpets (1994), 3 minutes.
- Songs of Rest and Unrest—Second Viola Sonata (1993–94), viola and piano, 13 minutes.
- Inveniendo Quaeretis for two violas (1994), 2 minutes.
- Children’s Corner for string quartet (1992), 5 minutes.
- A Tree of Life: fantasy for clarinet, cello, and piano (1992), 9 minutes.
- Seven for Three for oboe, horn, and piano (1991–92), 11 minutes.
- A View of Jerusalem, fanfare for brass, percussion, and organ (1990), 4 minutes.
- Quintet for Winds (1990), 12 minutes.
- Romanza for string trio (1989), 5 minutes.
- Duo (In Which Pooh Dances A Hoop In The Sand), for violin and cello (1988), 6 minutes.
- String Quartet No. 3 (1986–87), 16 minutes.
- First Viola Sonata (1986), viola and piano, 14 minutes.
- String Quartet No. 2 (1985), 17 minutes.
- Five Pieces for Violin and Viola (1983), 7 minutes.
- Sonata for Cello and Piano (1982–83), 13 minutes.
- String Quartet No. 1 (1982), 12 minutes.
- Rhapsody for Piano Trio (1981), 7 minutes.

=== Solo voice(s) and up to 5 players ===
- Prayer for Our Daughters for soprano and piano (2001), text by Mark Jarman, 4 minutes.
- Aubade, madrigal for vocal quintet (1995), text by Donald Davie, 4 minutes.
- Scenes from “The Mayor of Casterbridge” for soprano and piano, text by Mark Jarman.
- The Way In: Four Songs for Baritone and Piano (1985–86), texts by Rilke (translated by Robert Bly) and Mary Oliver, 12 minutes.
- Five Songs for High Voice and Piano (1985), texts by Novalis, Lorca, Mary Oliver, Robert Francis, and Rilke (translations by Robert Bly), 14 minutes.
- Wedding Song for baritone, violin, and viola (1985), text from the Song of Songs, 3 minutes.
- Black Branches (1982), a setting of four poems of William Carlos Williams for soprano and woodwind quintet, 11 minutes.

=== Chorus ===
- Wild Peace for mixed chorus (1996), text by Yehuda Amichai, 2 minutes.
- A Cypress Shall Rise for baritone soloist, chorus, and organ (1995), text from Isaiah (both original Hebrew and JPS translation), 6 minutes.
- Morning Poem for mixed chorus (1987), text by Mary Oliver, 4 minutes.
- A Valediction for mixed chorus (1986), text by Ernest Dowson, 2 minutes.
- God Speaks to Man But Once (1983)A part-song for mixed chorus and violin on a text by Rainer Maria Rilke (translated by Robert Bly), 3 minutes.

=== Solo keyboard ===
- Thoroughfare of Light for piano (2002–03), 9 minutes.
- Spinoza’s Rainbow for piano (1999), 13 minutes.
- Dream Work for piano (1995), 8 minutes.
- B’rachah (Benediction) for small harpsichord (1990), 5 minutes.
- Four Poetic Images for piano (1988), 10 minutes.
- Fantasia-Marcia for piano, after George Rochberg (1987), 3 minutes.
- Piano Fantasy (1987), 8 minutes.
- Piano Sonata in One Movement (1983), 7 minutes.

=== Solo instrumental ===
- Palimpsest for solo violin (2006), 3 minutes.
- Three Short Obsessions for solo violin (2004), 5 minutes.
- The Search for Delicious for solo flute (2003), 4 minutes.
- Wine-Dark Sea for solo viola (1988), 3 minutes.
- Sonata for Unaccompanied Violin (1985–86), 15 minutes.
- Air for solo violin (2009), 3 minutes.
- All'arme, for solo horn (2012), 1 minute.

=== Dance ===
- The Apparition: ballet in one act (2004), violin and piano, 9 minutes.
- The Night of the Iguana: ballet in one act (2003), medium orchestra (single winds and brass, percussion, solo piano, large complement of strings), 18 minutes.
- Yussel’s Prayer: ballet in one act (1990), solo dancer, flute, and cello, 9 minutes.

=== Opera ===
- The Mayor of Casterbridge: opera in four acts (1992), based on the Thomas Hardy novel, libretto by Mark Jarman (commissioned by Nashville Opera, unproduced to this date), 1 hour and 40 minutes.

=== Music for young performers ===
- Wildflower Hill for Suzuki violinists and cellists (1996), 3 minutes.
