= Wolsingham =

Town in County Durham, England

Coordinates: 54.731°N 1.882°W

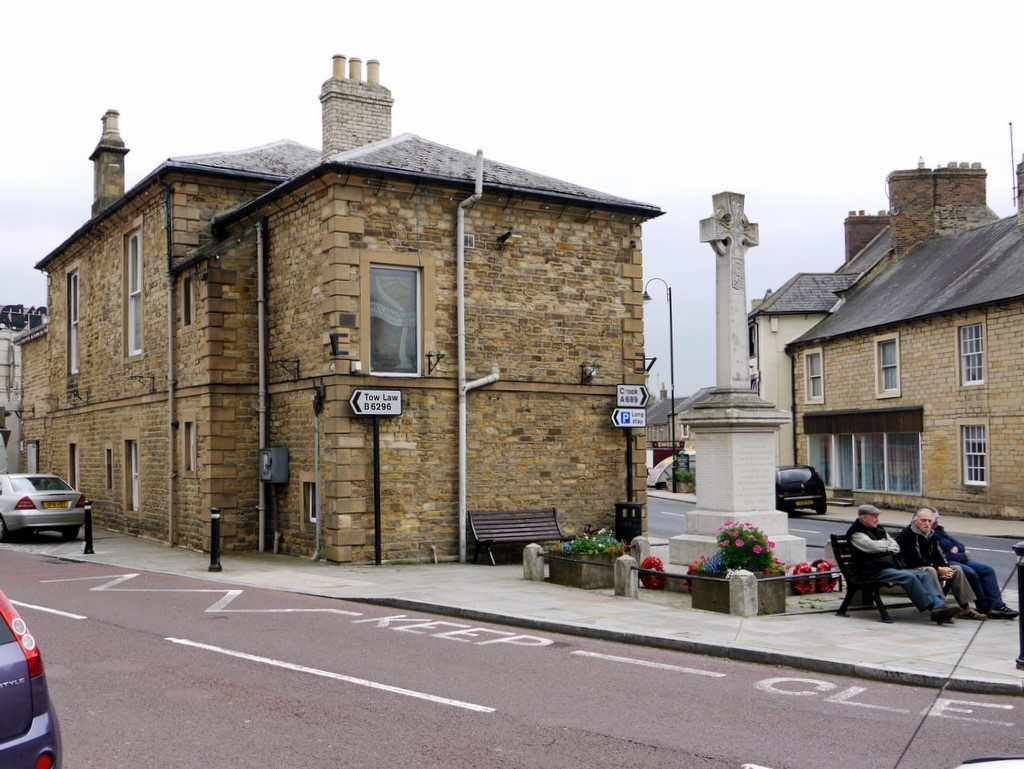
- Wolsingham Town Hall

- Location within County Durham
- Population: 2,720 (2011)
- OS grid reference: NZ075375
- Unitary authority: County Durham
- Ceremonial county: County Durham
- Region: North East
- Country: England
- Sovereign state: United Kingdom
- Post town: Bishop Auckland
- Postcode district: DL13
- Dialling code: 01388
- Police: Durham
- Fire: County Durham and Darlington
- Ambulance: North East
- UK Parliament: Bishop Auckland

Wolsingham is a market town in Weardale, County Durham, England. It is situated by the River Wear, between Crook and Stanhope.

== History ==
Wolsingham sits at the confluence of the River Wear and Waskerley Beck. It is a small settlement and one of the first market towns in County Durham, potentially deriving its name from the legendary Germanic family the Waelsingas, or from the personal name "Wolfsige". The earliest known record of the town is to be found in Reginald of Durham's Life of Godric where it is stated that the saint lived there for almost two years about 1120 AD with Elric the hermit.

Wolsingham was then a thriving community, holding land by servile tenure. There were shepherds, plough-makers, beekeepers, forest keepers, wood turners, carters, etc. They toiled for two purposes – producing corn and other foodstuffs for themselves and supplying the larder of the Bishop's Castle. The bishop and his friends indulged in hawking, but hunting for red deer in the parks of Wolsingham and Stanhope was their principal pastime. The bishops' hunting forest in Weardale was the second largest in England after the New Forest.

The oldest houses in Wolsingham are at Whitfield Place on Front Street. There are three cottages, the left-most dated 1677 and with the initials 'DM'.

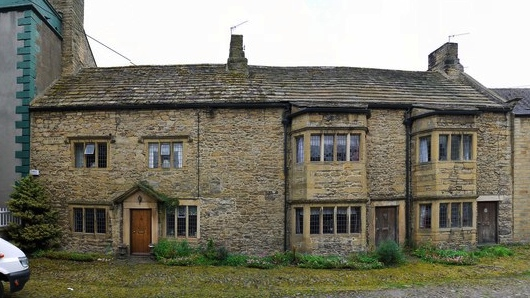
Cottages in Wolsingham

The other properties here have an even longer history. They are said to have been converted from the former Pack Horse Inn where Edward III may have rested on returning from his unfruitful encounter with the Scots in Weardale in April 1327. Another king, Charles II, is said to have ridden his horse up the internal staircase of the house in the 17th century and it still has an impressive staircase today.

In 1615 a market charter was granted to the bailiff and inhabitants of Wolsingham, and in 1667 the charter was confirmed with the allocation of a piece of land to hold the market and fairs. This market was of considerable importance and offered many facilities to the surrounding district. There were several looms in the town; table linens, draperies, weaving materials and clothes were always in demand. Drapers from Yorkshire and Newcastle upon Tyne frequented the market, as did hatters from Hexham and Barnard Castle. Spices and gingerbread were also on sale.

A memorial to the Roman Catholic priest John Duckett marks the spot where he was arrested before being taken to Tyburn in London, where he was executed in 1644. There is a Roman Catholic church and convent (now converted to housing) in the town, along with large Church of England, Baptist and Methodist congregations.

Wolsingham Grammar School was established in 1614, and in 1911 a new building was opened. It is now part of a split-site comprehensive school with another part built from 2014–2015 and opened in 2016 by the Duke of Gloucester. Wolsingham Grammar School is also home to the oldest world-war memorials in the country. The trees surrounding the field leading from the historical Bell Tower have names and were planted by the Head Teacher for each of the pupils of the school that had fallen during the war. The pupils and staff of Wolsingham Grammar School hold a service every Remembrance Day to remember the pupils who fell during the wars.

John Wesley, cofounder of the Methodist Church, made many visits to Weardale and preached in Wolsingham several times between 1764 and 1790 from a rough stone pulpit at the rear of Whitfield House. The first Wesleyan meeting house was built in 1776 for the Wolsingham Methodist Society and John Wesley preached there. The building was later used as an undertakers and is now part of the outbuildings of Whitfield House. Two further Wesleyan chapels were constructed in 1836 and 1862 and a Wesleyan school was built in the High Street in 1856. People attended from all over the dale and the numbers grew when the Wolsingham steelworks opened. In 1885 a Primitive Methodist chapel was built but went out of use in 1983 when its interior fittings were moved to the USA. St Thomas of Canterbury RC Church was built in 1854 and an associated school in 1864.

Wolsingham Town Hall, in the Market Place, was completed in 1824.

The Victorian industrialist Charles Attwood built an ironworks on the edge of the town, a major employer from 1864, producing steel from Weardale iron ore. Steel castings were produced for use in both shipbuilding and munitions, industries of major importance to the North East. The works made a major contribution to the war effort in both World Wars. Electric arc furnaces were installed around 1950 but trade declined and the works closed in 1984. Manufacture continued for a time on a smaller scale run by a workers cooperative until it closed for good in 2008. Film of the works in operation in 1962, when it still employed 500, can be seen at https://www.yfanefa.com/record/25719 Your Heritage - The River Wear. There are plans to fully develop the area after the site was levelled and decontaminated in 2009.

On the north hillside of Wolsingham Attwood built his home, Holywood Hall. After his death it became a hospital. This was the regional sanatorium for the treatment of tuberculosis, but by the early 1960s there were so few cases that it was virtually redundant although the open verandah rooms were still in use. In 1962 the decision was made to transfer elderly patients from Sedgefield Mental Hospital to this beautiful setting. The patients were mainly elderly long-term residents of impaired mental faculty who had no living relatives to care for them, were institutionalised and would have been unable to cope with independent living. When the hospital closed it was redeveloped into four dwellings and the land surrounding the Hall was developed to contain a number of luxury homes.

== Culture ==
=== Wolsingham Agricultural Society ===
Wolsingham Agricultural Society holds its annual show on the first weekend in September, with a daily attendance of more than 30,000. Established in 1763 it is one of the oldest shows in the country and brings in animals and visitors from a wide area. A funfair is held in the town the same weekend with many streets closed to traffic to cope with the crowds.

=== Weardale Railway ===
Wolsingham is served by the heritage Weardale Railway, which runs to Stanhope, including special steam services. First built in 1847 by the Stockton and Darlington Railway, it was closed to passengers in 1953, before the Beeching railway review closures of the 1960s. It continued to be used for freight before being finally mothballed in 1993. After much work and investment by new American owners, the heritage railway reopened in 2010 with a special train event running direct from London Kings Cross.

The Weardale Railway also used to transport up to 150,000 tonnes of high-quality coking coal per year from the Park Wall North surface mine 4 miles away using a new transload facility in Wolsingham, which opened in 2011. There was strong local opposition to the coal depot but planning permission was finally approved as the lorries avoid the town. Trains ran to a Scunthorpe steelworks, keeping alive the towns connections to steel making. This run ceased in 2015 following the collapse of UK Coal.

== Education ==
Wolsingham has two schools:

- Wolsingham Primary School, for 5- to 11-year-olds.
- Wolsingham School

== Media ==
Local news and television programmes are provided by BBC North East and Cumbria and ITV Tyne Tees. Television signals are received from the Pontop Pike TV transmitter and the local relay transmitter.

Local radio stations are BBC Radio Newcastle, Capital North East, Heart North East, Smooth North East, Sun FM, Greatest Hits Radio North East, and Bishop FM, a community based station which broadcast from Bishop Auckland.

The town is served by the local newspaper, The Northern Echo.

== Notable inhabitants ==
- Janet Taylor, astronomer, navigation expert, mathematician, and meteorologist.
- Bridget Atkinson, farmer and shell collector who amassed a collection from around the world. First honorary member of the Society of Antiquaries of Newcastle upon Tyne.
