= Sunniside, Weardale =

Coordinates: 54.742°N 1.785°W

Sunniside
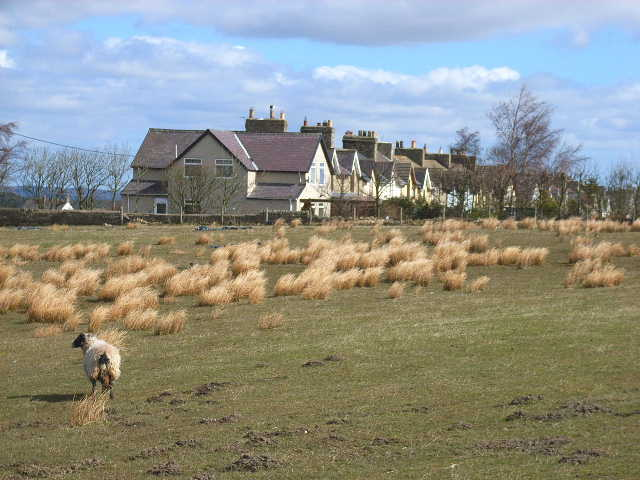

- Location within County Durham
- OS grid reference: NZ139385
- Shire county: County Durham
- Region: North East
- Country: England
- Sovereign state: United Kingdom
- Post town: DARLINGTON
- Postcode district: DL13
- Police: Durham
- Fire: County Durham and Darlington
- Ambulance: North East

Sunniside is a small rural village to the east of Tow Law and north of Crook in County Durham, England.

Sunniside has one pub, and a former post office. There is a collection of newly built homes in the west of the village, called The Paddock. There are five streets, Gladstone Terrace, Flag Terrace, Front Street (the main street) Garden Terrace, and a little offshoot along a back road to Roddymoor, called Grahams Cottages.

== Geography ==
Sunniside is one of the highest villages within the County of Durham, at 1,000 feet (300 m) above sea level.

== Notable people ==
- Morris Emmerson (born 1942), professional footballer
