= Brian Foster (physicist) =

British physicist

Brian Foster FRS OBE HonFInstP
- Born: 4 January 1954 (age 72); Roddymoor
- Citizenship: UK, Germany
- Education: Oxford University (D.Phil.)
- Spouse: Sabine Margot Foster
- Children: Paul Kai Foster, Mark Kristian John Foster
- Awards: Max Born Prize (2003); OBE (2003)
- Scientific career
- Fields: Particle physics, Accelerator physics
- Workplaces: Oxford University; Bristol University; Hamburg University
- Thesis: Three pion systems produced in 4.2 GeV/c K⁻ p interactions. (1978)
- Doctoral advisor: Pavel Grossman
- Website: http://www.brianfoster.co.uk

Brian Foster FRS OBE HonFInstP (born 4 January 1954 in Roddymoor, Crook, Co. Durham) is a British experimental particle physicist. He is Donald H. Perkins Professor of Experimental Physics Emeritus at the department of physics, University of Oxford, and Alexander von Humboldt Professor a. D. at the University of Hamburg. He was leading scientist at DESY where his research topics include new methods of acceleration, deep inelastic scattering using the ZEUS particle detector, and the International Linear Collider. He began his career on the 4,2m bubble chamber at CERN and then became a postdoctoral researcher at Rutherford Appleton Laboratory and Imperial College London, where he worked on the TASSO experiment at DESY. He was an author of the paper in which the discovery of the gluon was announced. He spent 20 years at Bristol University as successively Lecturer, Reader and then Professor of Experimental physics and head of the particle physics group. He was a member of the BaBar collaboration that discovered CP-violation in the B-quark system. He then became head of particle physics at Oxford University and a Fellow of Balliol College Oxford. In the last 20 years, Foster has worked predominantly in accelerator physics, particularly plasma acceleration. In 2004, he founded the John Adams Institute for Accelerator Science, a joint venture initially between Oxford University and Royal Holloway, University of London, subsequently joined by Imperial College London. He conceived the HALHF project, to design a much cheaper, greener form of Higgs Factory based on a hybrid of plasma- and conventional-based acceleration. His biography of Einstein, "Einstein - A Life in Science and Music" was published by Oxford University Press in February 2026.

== Music ==
Foster is an amateur violinist, who uses the instrument to help elucidate concepts in physics in popular lectures. Together with virtuoso violinist Jack Liebeck, he devised the Superstrings and Einstein's Universe lectures which link Einstein's love of music, his science and the latest discoveries in particle physics. They have been delivered world-wide around 200 times to live audiences totalling around 30,000. He has organised commissions of new works by Emily Hall and Anna Meredith, and by Edward Cowie. Foster is Vice President of the International Ernest Bloch Society. He and Jack Liebeck founded the Oxford May Music Festival in 2007, which combines cutting-edge science events with world-class concerts.

== Honours and awards ==
Foster was awarded a Humboldt Research Award in 1998 and both the Max Born Prize and the Order of the British Empire in 2003. He was selected for an Alexander von Humboldt Professorship in 2011. Foster was elected to the Royal Society in 2008. He served as a vice-president of the Royal Society in 2018 and was elected Honorary Fellow of the UK Institute of Physics in 2020.

== Publications ==
Books

1. B.Foster, editor, “Topics in High Energy Particle Physics”, Institute of Physics Publishing Ltd., 1988. 152pp.

2. B.Foster and P.H.Fowler, editors, “40 Years of Particle Physics”, Adam Hilger, 1988. 261 pp.

3. B.Foster, editor, “Electron-Positron Annihilation Physics”, Adam Hilger, 1990. 231 pp.

4. B. Foster, "Einstein - A Life in Science and Music", Oxford University Press, 2026. 684 pp.

Books (translation)

H.V. Klapdor-Kleingrothaus and K. Zuber, “Particle Astrophysics”, Institute of Physics Publishing Ltd., 1997. 507 pp. (From original German, with S.M. Foster)

Articles

Over 650 articles in refereed journals, including Nature, Nature Communications, Physics Letters, Physical Review Letters and European Journal of English Studies.
