= Wolsingham Town Hall =

Historic building in Wolsingham, County Durham, England

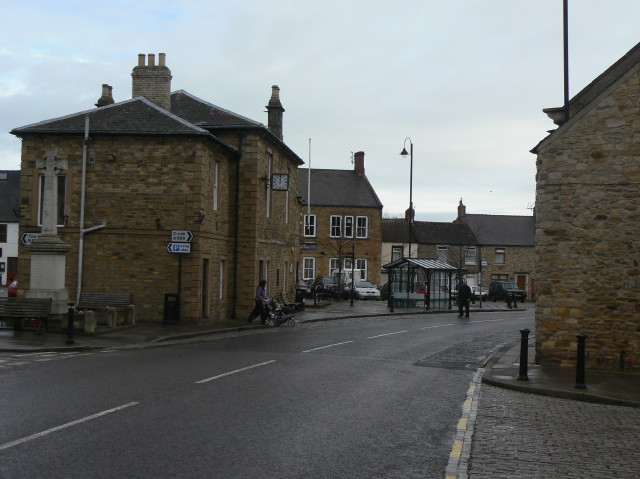
- The building (on the left) in 2009

- Shown in County Durham
- 54.7301°N 1.8835°W
- Location: Market Place, Wolsingham

History
- Built: 1824

Site notes
- Architectural style: Neoclassical style

Wolsingham Town Hall is a municipal building in the Market Place in Wolsingham, a town in County Durham, in England. It accommodates the local public library as well as the offices and meeting place of Wolsingham Parish Council.

== History ==
The building was commissioned by a board of trustees formed for the purpose and financed by public subscription. The site selected for the new building was in the centre of the Market Place on land formerly owned by the Bishop of Durham. It was designed in the neoclassical style, built in rubble masonry was completed in 1824. The design of the structure originally involved a symmetrical main frontage of just one bay facing onto Front Street. The building was fenestrated by sash windows on both floors. There were quoins at the corners and an ashlar stone band between the floors. Internally, the principal rooms included a large news reading room.

In 1856, the building was extended to the east to create a second bay, and, in 1869, it was still described as a "neat modern building". The building was enlarged again, with wings added that were slightly recessed from the main structure, in 1880.

The Market Place was leased to the trustees of the town hall and the rents from market stalls were applied for the upkeep of the town. During the 19th century, four generations of the Nicholson family served the parish council as parish clerks and at least three of those generations were based in the town hall. Petty session hearings were also held in the town hall. A war memorial, in the form of a celtic cross on a pedestal, intended to commemorate the lives of local service personnel who had died in the First World War, was unveiled to the immediate west of the town hall by General Sir Percy Wilkinson on 2 October 1920.

In 1972, the building was altered, to allow the entire ground floor to serve as a library, while the first floor continued to house the parish council offices. Some limited refurbishment works were carried out at a cost of £13,000 in 2007. Although maintained by Durham County Council, it continues to accommodate the offices and meeting place of Wolsingham Parish Council.
