= Edwin Carr (composer) =

New Zealand composer

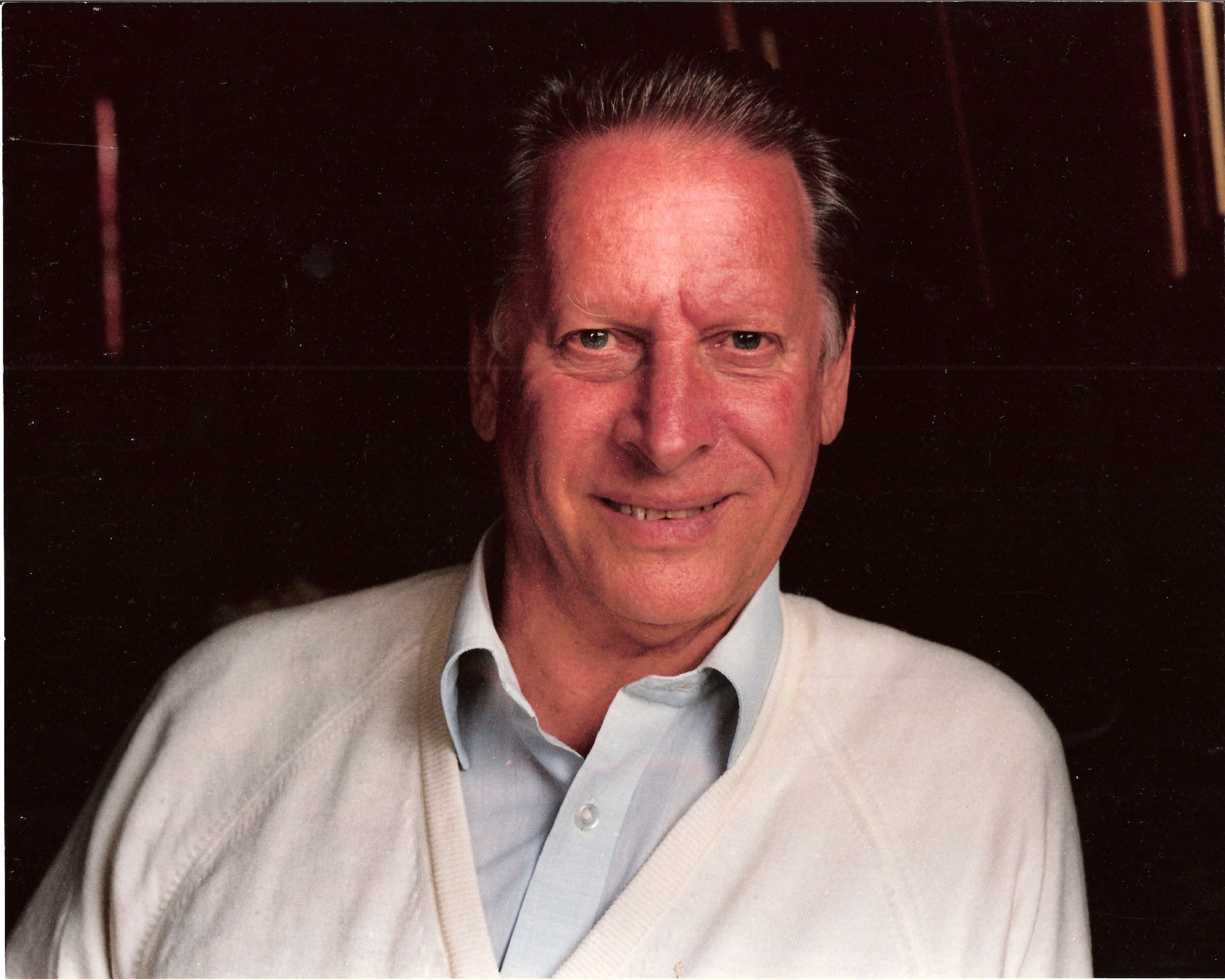
Edwin Carr in 1994.

Edwin James Nairn Carr MNZM (10 August 1926 – 27 March 2003) was a composer of classical music from New Zealand.

== Biography ==
Edwin Carr was born in Auckland and was educated at Otago Boys' High School from 1940 to 1943. He studied music at Otago University from 1944–5 and Auckland University College from 1946, then left with his degree unfinished. In 1946 he attended the first Cambridge Summer Music School with Douglas Lilburn as his composition tutor. In 1948 he travelled to England on a New Zealand Government Bursary, to study composition at the Guildhall with Benjamin Frankel. During this time he did much freelance work, travelled widely and met Geoffrey Grey.

In 1954 a British Council scholarship enabled him to study under Petrassi in Rome. He also worked in Italy as the musical director of an independent ballet company. In 1957 a further British Council scholarship enabled him to study with Carl Orff in Munich. In 1958 he returned to New Zealand, staying there until 1960 teaching and composing.

During the 1960s he spent time in both Australia and England, composing, teaching and studying as well as several trips to New Zealand.

In 1973–74 he was awarded the Mozart Fellowship at the University of Otago. From 1975–76 he taught composition at the Sydney Conservatorium of Music before returning to London in 1976. He returned to Australia in 1977 and taught part-time at the Sydney Conservatorium. In 1984 he returned to Taupō, New Zealand where he composed and conducted freelance.

From 1991, Carr lived on Waiheke Island where he was still active as a composer. In the 1999 Queen's Birthday Honours, he was appointed a Member of the New Zealand Order of Merit, for services to music. Edwin Carr died at his home on Waiheke Island on 27 March 2003.

== Works ==
=== Music works ===
- 1950 Mardi Gras Overture
- 1951 A Blake Cantata
- 1953 Suite No. 1 for two pianos (Cacciati dal Paradiso)
- 1954 String Quartet No. 1
- 1955 Piano Sonata No. 1
- 1955 Electra – Ballet
- 1958 Organ Sonata
- 1958 Night Music – Scherzo
- 1962 Piano Concerto No. 1
- 1963 The Snowmaiden
- 1963 Two Dances for viola and piano
- 1965 Four pieces for Oboe d'amore and piano (dedicated to Jennifer Paull)
- 1966 Edith Sitwell Song cycle for oboe, soprano and piano
- 1966 Piano Quintet
- 1966 Five Pieces for piano
- 1967 Five Pieces for Orchestra (transcription of 'Five pieces for piano')
- 1967 Three Shakespeare Songs
- 1967 Four Pieces for oboe d'amore, strings and harp (orch. ver. of 1965)
- 1968 Three Pieces for cello and piano
- 1969 Three Songs from Childhood for mezzo and violin
- 1969 Violin Sonata (unaccompanied)
- 1970 Suite No. 2 – Four dances from Electra for 2 pf and perc.
- 1970 Aubade for clarinet and pf or orchestra
- 1971 Suite No. 3 for two pianos
- 1971 Six Studies for string orchestra
- 1971 Auckland '71 – Ode for male speaker, chorus and orch.
- 1969 1972 – Nastasya – 3-act opera, based on Dostoievsky's The Idiot
- 1973 Six Songs – Out of Dark for mezzo and piano or orchestra
- 1973 Four Short Concert Studies for piano
- 1974 Three Love Songs for soprano & piano – poems by Fairburn
- 1974 Seven Medieval Lyrics for SATB, orchestra, or piano duet
- 1974 The Twelve Signs for wind, brass piano, harp and perc.
- 1975 Piano Sonata No. 2 in one movement
- 1975 Five Bagatelles for piano
- 1977 Sonatina for piano
- 1977 Five Songs to Poems by Wolkskehl – baritone & piano or orchestra
- 1977 Sonata for violin and piano
- 1978 Sinfonietta for small orchestra (Used for 'Primavera' ballet)
- 1978 String Quartet No. 2
- 1978 Seven Elizabethan Lyrics for chorus and piano duet or orchestra
- 1979 Te Tau (The Seasons) – Winter & Spring for solo piano; Summer and Autumn for piano duet
- 1979 An Easter Cantata for soprano, chorus and organ or string orch.
- 1981 Symphony No. 1
- 1983 Symphony No. 2
- 1983 Trio for horn, violin and piano
- 1985 Pacific Festival Overture
- 1985 Promenade ballet suite for orch. or piano duet
- 1985 The Mayors New Coat – ballet for orchestra
- 1985 Piano Sonata No. 3
- 1985 Piano Concerto No. 2
- 1985 Film Music for Nicholas Nickleby
- 1986 Song of Solomon symphonic cantata
- 1987 Symphony No. 3
- 1988 Poems for piano and orchestra
- 1989 The Four Elements for four mandolins
- 1989 The Four Elements for orch. or two pianos (transcriptions)
- 1989 Suite No. 4 for two pianos ('Four Elements' transcription)
- 1989 Quartet for oboe and clarinet, bassoon and piano
- 1989 Octet for wind
- 1990 Gaudeamus Overture
- 1990 Taupo – The Eye of the World for soprano, choir & orch.
- 1990 Prelude and Aria for Oboe d'Amore (dedicated to Jennifer Paull)
- 1991 Foxtrot from Coup De Folie – piano duet or piano solo
- 1991 Symphony No. 4
- 1991 Four pieces for oboe d'amore and piano
- 1991 Two Mansfield poems for Oboe d'Amore (dedicated to Jennifer Paull)
- 1991 Six choral Pieces from text by Katherine Mansfield
- 1992 Eleven Pleasant Pieces for piano
- 1992 Lord Arthur Savile's Crime – Opera in One Act
- 1992 Six Variations on a Theme by Beethoven for piano
- 1994 Sonata for two pianos
- 1995 Arikinui – cantata for soprano and orchestra
- 1995 Violin concerto
- 1996 The Maze of the Muses – Chamber Opera
- 1996 The End of the Golden Weather for orchestra
- 1996 Ten Concert Studies for piano – Book I
- 1996 Doves of Peace for piano
- 1996 Waiheke Island, A Suite for Oboe Consort (dedicated to Jennifer Paull)
- 1997 Outcast from Paradise
- 1997 Ngataringa Nocturne and Scherzo for oboe, oboe d'amore, and piano (dedicated to Jennifer Paull)
- 1997 Sonatina di Maggio for musette (oboe) (dedicated to Jennifer Paull)
- 1998 in the Rangitaki Valley for two pianos, eight hands
- 1998 Coup De Folie for two pianos, eight hands
- 1998 Eve des Eaux – Eight French songs for solo tenor
- 1998 Revelations for piano
- 1999 'Akaraua' – Four symphonic sketches for orchestra
- 1999 Three pieces for solo bassoon
- 1999 El Tango for orchestra
- 1999 Ten Concert studies for piano, Book 2
- 1999 Trio for violin, cello and piano
- 1999 Wind trio for flute, oboe and bassoon
- 1999 Mardi Gras 2000, new version
- 2000 Three pieces for oboe and organ
- 2000 Elegie for oboe and piano
- 2000 Petit Concert, pour trio a vent: flute, hautbois et basson
- 2001 Seven Waiheke Lyrics, SATB and piano duet
- 2001 Three Pieces for the oboe and organ
- 2001 Fanfare for Otago University
- 2001 Concerto Balabile
- 2002 Oboe Concerto (dedicated to Dominique Enon)

=== Books ===
- A Life Set to Music (autobiography)
