= Cloudcatcher Fells =

Work for brass band by John McCabe

Cloudcatcher Fells is a work for brass band by the British composer John McCabe. It was commissioned by Boosey & Hawkes Band Festivals as the test piece for the 1985 National Brass Band Championships finals.

The title of the piece comes from the poem "Cockermouth" by David Wright.

The work comprises four movements, played continuously. Each movement consists of sections associated with mountainous places, mostly in the area of Patterdale in the English Lake District:

1. Great Gable; Grasmoor; Grisedale Tarn – slow
2. Haystacks; Catchedicam (Catstye Cam) – quick
3. Angle Tarn – slow
4. Grisedale Brow; Striding Edge; Helvellyn – quick

The piece is tonal and broadly forms a set of free variations on the opening melody.

The work is dedicated to the composer's father.
