= Symphony No. 1 (Coates) =

Composition by Gloria Coates

The Symphony No. 1, Music on Open Strings, is a composition for string orchestra written between 1972 and 1974 by the American composer Gloria Coates. Its world premiere was held at the 1978 Warsaw Autumn festival where it was performed by the Polish Chamber Orchestra. The piece received wider recognition in 1980 when it became the first composition by a woman to be featured at the Musica Viva festival in Munich. The symphony is dedicated in memory of the Russian composer Alexander Tcherepnin, under whom Coates studied.

== Composition ==
The symphony lasts about 17 minutes in performance and is cast in four movements:

1. Theme and Transformation
2. Scherzo
3. Scordatura
4. Refracted Mirror Canon for Fourteen Lines

As the title suggests, all of the parts are written on open strings. In the first movement "Theme and Transformation," the strings are tuned to B♭, C, D♭, F, and G♭—a minor pentatonic scale. The composer noted that "the open strings in mosaic outline a melodic phrase which becomes gradually transformed into a new sound complex."

In the third movement "Scordatura," the strings are gradually retuned during performance back to the standard tuning of C, D, E, G, and A, resulting in a series of passing microtonalities. The last movement "Refracted Mirror Canon for Fourteen Lines" features a series of glissandi in a refracted mirror canon, about which Coates wrote, "The lines are in perpetual motion through the microtones building in quartet tones to the resolution, which is the square root of the sum total of the parts."

== Reception ==
Music on Open Strings was the first piece to bring Coates widespread recognition. Ken Walton of The Scotsman described the symphony as "momentous" and wrote, "Its tune-as-you-go third movement, 'Scordatura,' bore an unsettling fascination, like a mind-altering substance in musical manifestation." Michael Oliver of Gramophone similarly wrote that the symphony "clearly demonstrates her generation of complexity (but a complexity that you feel is always explicable) from simplicity."
