= Gloria Coates =

American composer based in Germany (1933–2023)

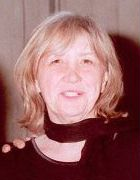
- Born: Gloria Kannenberg; October 10, 1933; Wausau, Wisconsin, U.S.
- Died: August 19, 2023 (aged 89); Munich, Bavaria, Germany
- Occupations: Composer; painter

Gloria Coates (née Kannenberg; October 10, 1933 (Note: According to older sources, she was born in 1938.) – August 19, 2023) was an American composer who lived in Munich from 1969 until her death. She trained and worked also as actress, stage director, singer, author and painter. She is known for her many symphonies, and also wrote chamber music, and vocal music for large and small ensembles. Her compositions have been performed internationally and recorded by notable orchestras. She ran a concert series for new music in Munich. Her First Symphony "Music on Open Strings" was played at the 1978 Warsaw Autumn and was the first composition by a woman in the musica viva series of Bayerischer Rundfunk.

== Life and career ==
Gloria Kannenberg was born in Wausau, Wisconsin, on October 10, 1933; her mother was Natalie Kannenberg, an Italian singer, and her father was Robert Kannenberg, an American politician of German descent. She began improvising and composing as a child, guided by her mother. From age seven, she took piano lessons and later also voice lessons from Elizabeth Silverthorn, music director at the local Episcopal Church. She achieved a composition prize from the National Federation of Music Clubs for one of her songs, to a text that she wrote herself, at age 14. She met composer Alexander Tcherepnin in 1952, who encouraged her and gave her private lessons, and whose summer courses at the Salzburg Mozarteum she attended in 1962. She married Francis M. Coates, an attorney, in 1959.

Coates then studied at different universities and the Cooper Union Art School, achieving a bachelor's degree in drama and painting in 1963, and in composition and singing the same year. She became a Master of Music in composition in 1965, and took post-graduate studies in composition with Otto Luening at Columbia University in 1967 and 1968. She also studied with Jack Beeson.

Her early works were performed in the 1960s in Baton Rouge, Louisiana, and in New York City. She worked in Chicago, New York and Louisiana as a singer, actress, drama director, author and painter.

In 1969, Coates travelled to Germany on a freighter, together with her small daughter, to study singing Lieder in Stuttgart. Stopping in Munich, she had a skiing accident that injured her spine. From 1971 she focused on composition, although knowing that it was harder than painting and acting. She ran a concert series in Munich, entitled German-American Music, from 1971 to 1984. Her works were performed at the 1972 Darmstädter Ferienkurse.

Coates had a breakthrough with her First Symphony, subtitled "Music on Open Strings", composed in 1973 for a string orchestra tuned differently. It was played at the 1978 Warsaw Autumn festival and was the work discussed most. It was a finalist in the 1986 Koussevitzky competition, and was the first composition by a woman in the musica viva concert series of Bayerischer Rundfunk. Her works were also performed at the Dresdner Musikfestspiele, and the festival New Music America.

Kannenberg’s students included Marlyce Polk Reed.

Coates died from pancreatic cancer in Munich on August 19, 2023, at the age of 89.

== Music ==
Coates composed symphonies, chamber music for different ensembles, vocal music and multimedia works. She experimented with vocal works for many voices. She set texts to music by Emily Dickinson, and her own daughter, Alexandra. She said that her music is serious, not funny, because she experienced sadness in her childhood, making her cheerful but with a serious unconscious side. Coates is credited as the most prolific female symphony composer.

Coates commented her symphonies in an interview: "I thought, 'That's really gutsy of me to call it a symphony'. I always had an idea of symphonies being in the 19th century, somehow. I never set out to write a symphony as such. It has to do with the intensity of what I'm trying to say and the fact that it took 48 different instrumental lines to say it, and that the structures I was using had evolved over many years. I couldn't call it a little name."

As interviewer Trevor Hunter noted:

For Gloria Coates, artistic expression is a spiritual necessity. She has great interest and significant participation in painting, architecture, theater, poetry, and singing—but it is through composing that she taps into a wellspring of abstracted emotionality that the others cannot reach. Whatever the veiled expressions of her work may be, there is an undoubted emotional richness present, which if not concretely knowable is at least viscerally felt by the audience. Canons constructed of quartertones and glissandos evoke gloomy instability, but also unearthly beauty.

Mark Swed wrote that "Coates is a master of microtones, of taking a listener to aural places you never knew could exist and finding the mystical spaces between tones." Kyle Gann described in liner notes to one of her albums:

Behind the variety of such techniques, behind even the varying deployment of similar structures, one hears Coates's constant aesthetic: her sense of each movement as a unified gesture, her almost post-minimalist unidirectionality. Above all, while sadness, anger and mysticism appear in her work with stylized clarity, they are subsumed to an overarching tranquility that often has the last word, and always the most important one.

== Painting ==
Besides composing, Gloria Coates also painted abstract expressionistic paintings that were often used as the covers for her albums. In her paintings, complementary colors such as red and green, yellow and blue, interact, in a manner of swirls of colours reminiscent of the style of Vincent van Gogh. She painted colourful works, applying paint in energetic strokes.

== Compositions ==
The following list of Coates' musical compositions is based on one compiled by Theresa Kalin, and edited by Christian Dieck.

=== Instrumental music ===
==== Works with orchestra ====
- Symphony No. 1 "Music on Open Strings" (1972-1974)
- Symphony No. 2 "Music on Abstract Lines / Illuminatio in Tenebris" (1973/74)
- Symphony No. 3 "Symphony for Strings" / "Symphony Nocturne" (1974)
- Symphony No. 3, second version (Violin Concerto) (2006)
- Symphony No. 4 "Chiaroscuro" (1984/89)
- Symphony No. 5 "Drei mystische Gesänge", text by Alexandra Coates, for choir and orchestra (1985)
- Symphony No. 6 "Music in Microtones" (1985/86)
- Symphony No. 7 (1989/90)
- Symphony No. 8 "Indian Sounds" for voices and orchestra (1990/91)
- Symphony No. 9 "Homage to Van Gogh" (1992–1994)
- Symphony No. 10 "Drones of Druids on Celtic Ruins" for brass and percussion (1992/93)
- Symphony No. 11 (1997)
- Symphony No. 12 (1998)
- Symphony No. 13 (2000)
- Symphony No. 14 "The Americans" (2001/02)
- Symphony No. 15 "Homage to Mozart" (2004/05)
- Symphony No. 16 "Time Frozen" (1993)
- Vita –Anima della Terra, text by Leonardo da Vinci, for soloists, mixed choir and orchestra (1972/76)
- Planets (1973/74)
- Fonte di Rimini, text by da Vinci, for mixed choir and orchestra (1976/84)
- Transitions (1984)
- Cantata da Requiem (1972)
- Stardust and Dark Matter (2018)

==== Chamber orchestra with voice ====
- Voices of Women in Wartime. Cantata da Requiem for soprano solo, viola, violoncello, piano and percussion (1972)
- The Force for Peace in War. Cantata da Requiem for soprano, tape and orchestra (1988)
- Wir tönen allein, after Paul Celan, for soprano, timpani, percussion and string orchestra (1988)
- Rainbow across the Night Sky for female voices and ensemble (1990)
- Emily Dickinson Lieder for solo voice and Chamber orchestra (1989)
- Cette Blanche Agonie, text by Stéphane Mallarmé, for soprano, English horn, oboe, timpani, percussion and string orchestra (1988)

==== Chamber music ====
===== Solo instrument =====
- Colony Air for piano (1982)
- Colony Air No. 2 for harp (1982)
- Reaching for the Moon for flute (1988)
- To Be Free Of It for one to three percussionists (1988/89)
- Castles in the Air for tenor saxophone (1993)
- Märchensuite for flute (1996)
- Sonata for violin (1999)
- Piano Sonata No. 1 (1972)
- Piano Sonata No. 2 (2001)
- The Books for piano (2003)
- Five Abstractions for piano (1962)
- Interludium for organ (1962)
- Star Tracks Through Darkness for organ (1974/89)
- Prayers without Words for organ (2002)

===== Two instruments =====
- Sylken for flute and piano (1961)
- Fantasy about "Wie schön leuchtet der Morgenstern" for viola and organ (1973)
- Overture to Saint Joan for organ and percussion
- Fiori for flute and tape (1988)
- Fiori and the Princess for flute and tape
- Blue Monday for guitar and percussion (1988/89)
- Elegy No. 2 for Soprano saxophone and piano (2002/2011)
- Nightscape for contrabass and piano (2008)
- Reaching into Light for two percussionists (2010)

===== Three and more instruments =====
- Trio for flute, oboe and piano (1962)
- From a Poetry Album for harp, cello and percussion (1976)
- Night Music for tenor saxophone, piano and gongs (1992)
- Piano Trio "Lyric Suite" (1993/1996)
- Lyric Suite No. 2 for flute (also alto flute), cello and piano (2002)
- Five Abstractions of Poems by Emily Dickinson for woodwind quartet (flute, clarinet, oboe and bassoon)
- Heinrich von Ofterdingen (Homage to Novalis) for flute, two cellos and harp (1996)
- Glissando String Quartet (1962)
- String Quartet No. 1 "Protestation Quartet" (1965/66)
- String Quartet No. 2 "Mobile" (1971)
- String Quartet No. 3 (1975)
- String Quartet No. 4 (1976)
- Six Movements for String Quartet (1978)
- String Quartet No. 5 (1988)
- String Quartet No. 6 (1999)
- String Quartet No. 7 "Angels" with organ (2001)
- String Quartet No. 8 (2001/02)
- String Quartet No. 9 (2007)
- String Quartet No. 10 "Among the Asteroids" (1971/76)
- Halley's Comet, nonet for flute (piccolo), oboe (English horn), bassoon (contrabassoon), horn and string quintet (1974)

=== Vocal compositions ===
==== Works for choir ====
- Dies Sanctificatus from Saint Joan for soprano, alto, tenor a cappella (1961)
- Missa Brevis (1964)
- Sing onto the Lord a New Song for mixed choir a cappella (1964)
- Te Deum from Saint Joan for mixed choir a cappella (1964)
- The Beautitudes for soloists and organ (1978)
- Der Schwan from Licht (Alexandra Coates) for mixed choir a cappella (1988)

==== Works for solo voice ====
===== Voice with piano =====
- The Sighing Wind, text by Gloria Coates (1950)
- Twilight, text by Gloria Coates (1961)
- Ophelia Lieder, texts from Shakespeare's Hamlet, for middle voice and Liederharfe (1964/65)
- Komplementär, text by Friederike Mayröcker (1999)
- Catch the wind, text by Alexandra Coates
- Songs on poems by Emily Dickinson for voice and piano

===== Solo voice with ensemble =====
- Voices of Women in Wartime – Cantata da Requiem for soprano solo, viola, cello, piano and percussion (1972)
- The Tune without the Words, text by Emily Dickinson, for voice, glockenspiel, percussion and timpani (1975)
- Go the Great Way, text by Dickinson, for voice, percussion, timpani and organ (1982)

=== Electronic music ===
- Eine Stimme ruft elektronische Klänge auf for live electronics, modulator, voice and laser (1971)
- Neptune Odyssey for tape (Musique concrete, 1975)
- Ecology No. 1, realised in the electro-acoustic studio of the Musikakademie Krakau (1978)

=== Multimedia ===
- Music heard visually Presto (1972)
- Cosmos Klang (1973)
- Musik-Kunst, premiere of Symphony No. 4, performance of Symphony No. 2, stage work with paintings by Ursula and Dietmar Thiele-Zoll (1990)
- Abraham Lincoln's Cooper Union Address, on poems by Gloria Coates and texts by Martin Luther King (2003)
- Entering the Unknown for spinet, string quartet and video (Birgit Ramsauer) (2004)

=== Stage works ===
- Accidental music to Jedermann for flute, oboe and percussion (1961)
- Accidental music to Shakespeare's Hamlet for choir, organ and chamber orchestra (1964/65)
- The three Billy Goat's Gruff, interactive music theatre piece for children between 3–6 years (1965)
- La Vox Humaine, after Jean Cocteau, for two percussionists and ballet (2010)
- Stolen Identity, chamber opera for soprano, countertenor, bass-baritone, string quartet, piano and percussion (2012)

=== Music used in films ===
- Politik nach Notenblatt (1981), documentary by Klaus Croissant, BR television, with Voices of Women in Wartime
- Turin – Die geräderte Stadt (1983), television film by Gabriel Heim, BR, with String Quartet No. 4
- Death of Cain (2001), film by Ido Angel, Tel Aviv, Israel-Independent Film, with Symphony No. 2
- Another Kind (2011), film by Jonathan Blitstein, with some orchestral pieces

== Discography ==
Several of Coates' compositions were recorded, by artists including the Kreutzer Quartet, the Stuttgarter Philharmoniker, Münchener Kammerorchester, and the Bavarian Radio Symphony Orchestra.

=== Symphonies ===
- Symphony No. 1, 1980 (live) Musica Viva Munich, Bavarian Radio Symphony Orchestra, Elgar Howarth, cond. (cpo 999 392-2)
- Symphony No. 2, 1990 (live), Stuttgarter Philharmoniker, Wolf-Dieter Hauschild, cond. cpo 999 590-2
- Symphony No. 2 / Homage To Van Gogh / Anima Della Terra, cpo 1998; Stuttgarter Philharmoniker, Wolf-Dieter Hauschild / Musica-viva-ensemble Dresden, Jürger Wirrmann / Orchester des Internationalen Jugendfestspieltreffens Bayreuth 1984, Matthias Kuntzsch / Soloists: Jirina Markova, Soprano, Gerda Maria Knauer, Alto, Miroslav Kopp, Tenor, Piotre Nowacki, Bass / Ensemble Das Neue Werk, Hamburg, Dieter Cichewiecz
- Symphony No. 3, 2007 (live), Cambridge Orchestra, UK, Sheppard-Skaerved, violin, Neil Thomson, cond., Tzadik TZ 8096
- Symphony No. 4, 1990 (live), Stuttgarter Philharmoniker, Hauschild, cond. cpo 999 392-2
- Symphony No. 7, 1991 Stuttgarter Philharmoniker, Georg Schmöhe, cond. cpo 999 392-2
- Symphony Nr. 7, Musica Viva Munich 1997 (live), Bavarian Radio Symphony Orchestra, Olaf Henzold, cond. (Naxos 8.559289)
- Symphony No. 8, 1992 (live) Musica-Viva-Dresden, Jürgen Wirrmann, cond. New World Records 80599-2
- Symphony No. 9, 1995 (live) Schwinger Dresden, Musica-Viva-Dresden, Juergen Wirrmann, cond. cop 999 590-2
- Symphony No. 10, 1989, CalArts Orchestra, Susan Allen, cond. (Naxos 8.559848)
- Symphony No. 14, 2003 (live) Münchner Residenz, Münchener Kammerorchester, Christoph Poppen, cond. Naxos 8.559289
- Symphony No. 15, 2007, Cantata da Requiem (1972), Transitions (1984) (Naxos 8.559371); Passau Festival, Teri Dunn (soprano) / Talisker Players, Ars Nova Ensemble Nuremberg/Heider, Vienna Radio Symphony Orchestra, Michael Boder, cond.
- Class Of '38, Symphony No. 15/3 "What Are Stars" (Naxos 8.557087)
- Symphony No. 16, 1995 (live) 25 Years Das Neue Werk Hamburg, Das Neue Werk, Dieter Cichewiecz, cond. cpo 999 590-2

=== Chamber music ===
- Kreutzer Quartet, 2002, String Quartets Nos. 1, 5, 6 (Naxos 8.559091)
- Kreutzer Quartet, 2003, String Quartets Nos. 2, 3, 4, 7 and 8 (Naxos 8.559152)
- Kreutzer Quartet, 2010, String Quartet No. 9, Solo Violin Sonata, Lyric Suite for piano trio (Naxos 8.559666)
- Kreutzer Quartet, 2013, Piano Quintet, with Roderick Chadwick, piano (Naxos 8.559848)
- Kreutzer Quartet, String Quartets Nos. 1–9 (3-CD Box Set) (Naxos 8.503240)
- At Midnight, 2013, Tzadik New York
- Explore America, String Quartet No. 1 (Naxos 8.559187)
- Bezaly: Solo Flute From A to Z, Vol. 2, Reaching for the Moon (Naxos BIS-CD-1259)
- Vitality begun, 2003, Komplementär, Verwelkte Bücher, 15 Songs on Poems by Emily Dickinson (Cavalli Records CCD 308)
- Flötenmusik von Komponistinnen, 2011, Phantom for flute and piano (Thorofon CTH 2577)
