= Jennifer Paull =

British oboist, author, and publisher (born 1944)

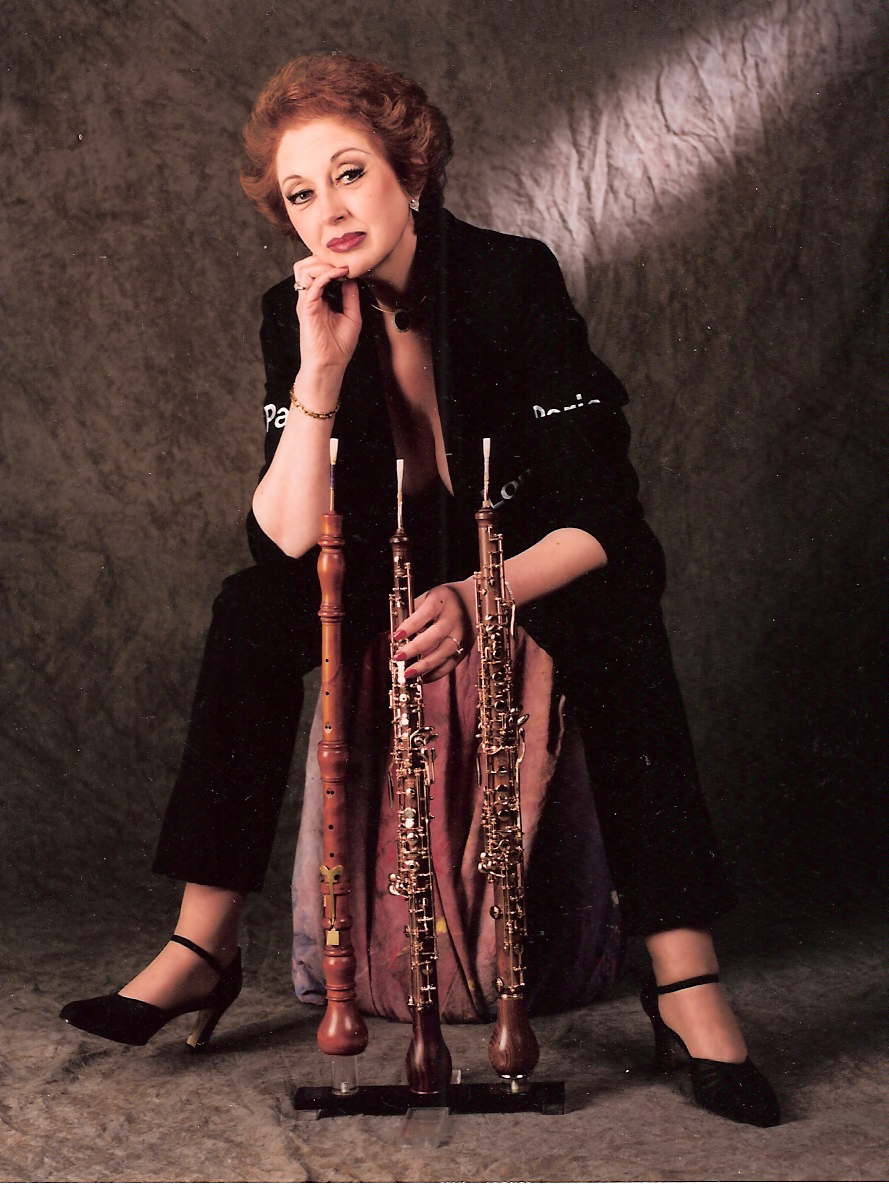
- Born: Jennifer Irène Schulcz; 24 November 1944 (age 81); Liverpool, England
- Occupations: musician (oboe d'amore); writer; author; publisher

Jennifer Irène Paull is a musician, writer, author, and publisher.

Jennifer Paull was born in Liverpool, England, 24 November 1944, as Jennifer Irène Schulcz. Her father changed the family name when she was five. He was born in Léva, Hungary, during the time of the Austro–Hungarian Empire (Slovakia today). Her mother was of Scottish and Welsh descent. Through her paternal grandmother, Jennifer Paull is directly related to the composers Felix Mendelssohn and Arnold Schönberg

== Career ==
Jennifer Paull is an oboe d'amore (alto oboe) soloist. Her career has been spent in researching, instigating, commissioning and publishing repertoire for the oboe d'amore and subsequently, the other rare members of the oboe family of instruments. Her aim has been to make this virtually forgotten instrument into a contemporary recital voice, not uniquely one of the Baroque with which it was virtually exclusively associated when she began this mission during her studies at the Royal College of Music, London (1964). Edwin Carr was the first international composer to write for her during the late 1960s and others followed as she became known for her specialisation and her acclaimed performance as a soloist. Insufficient material had existed before her pioneering work to sustain a recital career on the oboe d’amore.

She quickly became established as an oboe d'amore expert, in particular with the BBC Symphony Orchestra and BBC Philharmonic Orchestra, with whom she recorded the oboe d'amore obbligati in the BBC Bach Cantata Series. She was later to abandon orchestral playing completely to concentrate entirely on her career as a soloist playing the oboe d'amore exclusively. Many works have been written for her for oboe d’amore and the other rare members of the oboe family of instruments, including six each by Leonard Salzedo and Edwin Carr. The Australian composer, Ian Keith Harris, has written sixteen.

Jennifer Paull gave recitals in Great Britain and Europe with John McCabe, who composed both Concerto for Oboe d'amore and Chamber Orchestra and Dance-Prelude (for oboe d'amore and piano) for her. The duo were honoured to give the première of this piece (commissioned by the Merseyside Arts Council and the City of Liverpool) at a Royal Gala Performance in the presence of Queen Elizabeth II, at the Liverpool Empire Theatre (1971). She has given many concerts and lecture recitals in the Americas, Europe and the Middle East.

Working in Novello & Co., London, as Promotion Manager (1970/1972), she was in regular contact with their house composers. Through her continued recital work, her contacts with contemporary composers expanded and she subsequently worked both in the management of Bruno Maderna and in close collaboration with Cathy Berberian. Her repertoire through such connections increased sufficiently for her to establish her own publishing company, Amoris International, in the mid 1990s. This was based entirely on the fruits of her work. Amoris is Latin for d’amore.

In 1995 Jennifer Paull recorded The Oboe d'amore Collection Volume I, the first ever CD devoted exclusively to the oboe d'amore: The Oboe d'amore Collection Volume II and The Amoris Consort were recorded in 1996. A further CD, including the Telemann Oboe d'amore Concerto in A Major was recorded by her (1997) with the Craiova 'Oltenia' Philharmonic Orchestra under Michel Barras, for the Association François-Xavier Bagnoud.

== Donation ==
In 2009, Jennifer Paull donated her entire Amoris International library of publications to the Werner Icking Music Archive (WIMA), which has since been linked to International Music Score Library Project (IMSLP), also known as the Petrucci Music Library.

== Personal life ==
Jennifer Paull, a synaesthete, has four children, two daughters and two sons; Patrick Hufschmid, the celebrated guitar builder and plectrier, and Pascal Hufshmid, an art historian and world-renowned expert on Photography, the Director of the International Red Cross and Red Crescent Museum, Geneva. She lives in Switzerland near the French border in a wine-growing village not far from Montreux.

== Writings ==
Jennifer Paull has written many articles for specialist double reed society magazines and others, in particular the classical music magazine, Music and Vision Daily, now Classical Music Daily.

Her book, Cathy Berberian and Music’s Muses was published by Amoris Imprint in 2007.

In the spring of 2020, she was asked by the New Oboe Music Project to write a piece explaining how she had undertaken her pioneering mission. This article, Oboe d’amore: Mission Impossible, was published in four parts throughout the month of June of that year:

Part I, Part II, Part III, Part lV.
