= Morris Emmerson =

English footballer

Personal information
- Date of birth: 23 October 1942 (age 84)
- Place of birth: Sunniside, England
- Position: Goalkeeper

Youth career
- –1962: Middlesbrough

Senior career*
Years	Team	Apps	(Gls)
1962–1963	Middlesbrough	10	(0)
1963–1964	Peterborough United	7	(0)
Total		17	(0)
- * Club domestic league appearances and goals

Morris Emmerson (born 23 October 1942) is an English former professional footballer who played as a goalkeeper.

== Career ==
Born in Sunniside, Emmerson made 17 appearances in the Football League for Middlesbrough and Peterborough United between 1962 and 1964. Emmerson retired from the game at age 22, as he didn't view it as a secure enough career for his family, and instead began work in the IT business.
