= Nigel Clarke (composer) =

British composer and musician

Nigel Clarke (born 1960) is a British composer and musician. He is a former head of composition and contemporary music at the London College of Music and Media.

Clarke began his career as a military bandsman, then studied composition at the Royal Academy of Music with composer Paul Patterson. While at the Royal Academy, he was awarded the Queen's Commendation for Excellence. He was previously Young Composer in Residence at The Hong Kong Academy for Performing Arts, Composition and Contemporary Music Tutor at the Royal Academy of Music, London, Head of Composition at the London College of Music and Media, a visiting tutor at the Royal Northern College of Music and Associate Composer to the world-famous Black Dyke Mills Band, Associate Composer to the Band of the Grenadier Guards, Composer-in-Residence to the Marinierskapel der Koninklijke Marine (Marine Band of the Royal Netherlands Navy) and Associate Composer to Brass Band Buizingen in Belgium. He has also been guest professor at the Xinjiang Arts Institute in China and Associate Composer to the Royal Military School of Music, Kneller Hall. More recently he has been Visiting Composer to Middle Tennessee State University Bands.

In 1997, Clarke visited the United States as part of the country's International Visitor Leadership Program, and the President's Own Marine Band performed one of his pieces, "Samurai", conducted by Colonel Timothy Foley. The Winnipeg Free Press described the piece as a throbbing, raucous work influenced by Japanese drumming.

In 2015 he collaborated with Danish writer Malene Sheppard Skærved on his first symphony ("A Richer Dust") for Speaker and Symphonic Wind Orchestra. Using music and words, ‘A Richer Dust’ explores what it means to live with violence and extremism, the constant companions of human history. The intertwined text and music, ideas and images, weave together voices ranging from those of historically significant figures through to the voiceless, ordinary people living in extraordinary times. "A Richer Dust" was commissioned by Dr Reed Thomas and the Middle Tennessee State University (MTSU) Wind Ensemble. It was premiered on 14 April 2015 by Dr Reed Thomas (Conductor), H. Stephen Smith (Speaker) and the MTSU Wind Ensemble in the T. Earl Music Hall, Wright Music Building, Murfreesboro, Tennessee, USA. The European Premiere was given by the Regimental Band of the Irish Guards on 6 November in the Guards Chapel, London, under the baton of the composer with WO1 Andrew Porter as Speaker.

A number of Clarke's works have been recorded on the Naxos Record label, most recently with the Grimethorpe Colliery Band.

== Early life ==
After failing the 11 plus, Clarke attended St. John's Secondary Modern School, Margate, UK. In 1979 he joined the Staff Band of the Royal Army Medical under the direction of Major Peter Parkes and attended the Royal Military School of Music (Kneller Hall) the same year. In 1982 Clarke started his studies as a composition student at the Royal Academy of Music and also joined the Band of the Irish Guards which he served with until 1986.

== Discography ==
- Samurai (Wind Orchestra The Royal Marines Band conducted by Lt Col Chris Davis); Loulan (Violin: Peter Sheppard Skaerved); The Miraculous Violin (Violin and Strings: Peter Sheppard Skaerved & Longbow); Pernambuco (Violin: Peter Sheppard Skaerved); Premonitions (Trumpet: James Watson). Recorded 2007. Naxos 8.570429
- Dial H for Hitchcock; Swift Severn's Flood; Mysteries of the Horizon; Earthrise. Performed by The Grimethorpe Colliery Band conducted by Nigel Clarke, Sandy Smith & David Thornton Recorded. Cornet Soloist: Harmen Vanhoorne. Recorded in 2019/20 at the Foundry Recording Studio, Sheffield. Naxos 8.574097
- Nigel Clarke Music for Strings - Parnassus; The Scarlet Flower; Dogger, Fisher, German Bight, Humber, Thames, Dover Wight; Pulp & Rags; Epitaph for Edith Cavell. Performed by Longbow, Peter Sheppard Skaerved (Violin). Sebastien Rousseau (Flugel Horn) & Melene Sheppard Skaerved (Speaker). Recorded in 2014/15 in All Saints Church, Tooting, London SW17. Toccata Classics TOCC 0325
- Outrageous Fortune (Symphony No 2). Performed by Middle Tennessee State University Wind Ensemble conductor: Reed Thomas, Brett Baker (Trombone Soloist), Natalie Grady (Voice Actor). Recorded in 2016 in the Hinton Hall, Middle Tennessee State University, Murfreesboro, USA. Toccata Classics TOCN 003
- Lindisfarne Stone - Peter Sheppard Skaerved (Violin) / Tamami Honma (Piano). Echo & Narcissus - Janne Thomsen (Flute). Spectroscope - Neil Heyde (Cello). Solstice - Philip Mead (Piano). Pernambuco - Peter Sheppard Skaerved (Violin). Premonitions - James Watson (Trumpet). Chinese Puzzles - Janne Thomsen (Flute), Tamami Honma (Piano). Recorded in 1998 in the Conway Hall, London, UK. Metier MSV CD92024
- Earthrise; Heritage Suite; Their Finest Hour. Performed by Middle Tennessee State University Wind Ensemble conductor: Reed Thomas. Recorded in 2012 in the Wright Music Hall, Middle Tennessee State University, Murfreesboro, USA. Naxos 8.573184
- Equiano for Clarinet Quintet. Performed by Linda Merrick (Clarinet) and the Navarra Quartet. Recorded in 2008 at Lord Rhodes Room, Middle Royal Northern College of Music, Manchester, UK. Naxos 9.570122
- Mysteries of the Horizon; A Richer Dust (Symphony No. 1). Performed by Middle Tennessee State University Wind Ensemble conductor: Reed Thomas / Cornet Soloist: Harmen Vanhoorne.. Recorded in 2015 at the Wright Music Hall, Middle Tennessee State University, Murfreesboro, USA. Toccata Classics TOCC 0412
- Solstice - Philip Mead (Piano). Graham Caskie (Piano). Recorded in 1993 in the Adrian Boult Hall, Birmingham, UK. Metier MSV CD92004
- When Worlds Collide; Swift Severn's Flood; The City in the Sea (Concerto for Euphonium and Brass Band); Tilbury Point; Mysteries of the Horizon (Concerto for Cornet and Brass Band). Performed by Brass Band Buizingen conducted by Luc Vertommen, Soloists: Harmen Vanhoorne (Cornet) & Glenn Van Looy (Euphonium), Speaker: Frank Renton with Poetry by Martin Westlake. Recorded in 2012/2013 in Belgium. Mirasound 88931-2

Film Score Recordings

- The Thief Lord (Co-written score with Michael Csanyi-Wills). Performed by The London Symphony Orchestra, Conductor: Robin Page. Recorded in 2005 at the AIR Lyndhurst Studios, London, UK. Colosseum LC 03387
- Will (Co-written score with Michael Csanyi-Wills). Performed by The London Symphony Orchestra, Conductor: Chris Davis OBE. Recorded in 2011 at the Abbey Road Studios, London, UK. Varese Sarabande VSD -7124
- The Little Polar Bear (Der Kleine Eisbar) (Co-written score with Michael Csanyi-Wills). Performed by The Royal Philharmonic Orchestra, Conductor: Robin Page. Recorded in 2001 at the Angel Studios, London, UK. Nord-Sud Verlag
- The Rocket Post (Co-written score with Michael Csanyi-Wills). Performed by The Royal Philharmonic Orchestra, Conductor: Robin Page. Recorded in 2006 at the AIR Lyndhurst Studios, London, UK. MovieScore Media MMS-07006
- The Little Vampire (Der Kleine Vampir) (Co-written score with Michael Csanyi-Wills). Performed by The Bulgarian Symphony Orchestra, Conductor: Robin Page. Recorded in 2000 in Sofia at Studio 1, Bulgarian National Radio. Universal Music Company LC 00270
- Baseline (Co-written score with Michael Csanyi-Wills). Recorded in 2010 in London by Moviefonics Ltd.

== Accolades ==
- 1987: The Queen’s Commendation for Excellence The Royal Academy of Music (London) highest distinction.
- 2006: Co-Nominee World Soundtrack Awards ‘Discovery Of The Year′ - The Thief Lord (Movie)
- 2013: Winner (the composer requested that the prize was withdrawn) British Academy of Songwriters, Composers and Authors (BASCA) `British Composer Awards’ Mysteries of the Horizon
- 2016: Nominee British Academy of Songwriters, Composers and Authors (BASCA) `British Composer Awards’ A Richer Dust

== Works by Nigel Clarke ==
Chamber music

- Echo & Narcissus – solo flute (1985)
- Spectroscope – solo cello (1987)
- Lindisfarne Stone – violin & Piano (1989)
- Flashpoint – solo viola (1990)
- Premonitions – solo trumpet (1990)
- Chinese Puzzles – flute & piano (1992)
- Pernambuco – solo violin (1993)
- On the Wings of the Wind – classical accordion (1993)
- The Hemlock Stone – solo clarinet (1997)
- The Devil and the Hemlock Stone – Clarinet and sound design (1999)
- Loulan – solo violin (2002)
- Equiano – clarinet quintet (2008)
- Where A Scarlet Flower Will Blossom – solo trumpet (2014)
- An Epitaph for Edith Cavell – solo violin (2014)
- The Exotic Dream of the Wonderful Monsieur Magritte - Trumpet & Sound Design (2016)

Keyboard

- Solstice – solo piano (1991)

String orchestra

- Parnassus (1986)
- Winter Music (1991)
- The Miraculous Violin – violin concerto (2000)
- Dogger Fisher German Bight Humber Thames Dover Wight – (2013)
- Pulp Rag – (2014)
- The Scarlet Flower – Concertino for Flugel Horn & Strings – (2014)

Brass band

- Atlantic Toccata (1993)
- The City in the Sea - Euphonium Concerto – (1994)
- The Pendle Witches (1996)
- Mechanical Ballet (1997)
- Gwennan Gorn (1997)
- Breaking the Century (1999)
- Swift Severn's Flood (2009)
- Earthrise (2010)
- Tilbury Point – [transcription by Nigel Clarke] (2010)
- When Worlds Collide A Space Symphony (2012)
- Mysteries of the Horizon - Cornet Concerto – (2012)
- Forgotten Heroes – "March" [transcription by Luc Vertommen] (2013)
- Dial `H' for Hitchcock – (2016/19)
- Kia kaha – Euphonium Solo (2019)
- Wild Winds Coldly Blow – Tenor Horn Solo (2020)

Symphonic Wind Orchestra/Concert Band

- Samurai (1995)
- City in the Sea – Euphonium Concerto [transcription] (1997)
- Breaking the Century [transcription] (1999)
- Battles & Chants - clarinet concerto (2001)
- Mata Hari (2002)
- Tilbury Point (2003)
- King Solomon's Mines (2003)
- Gagarin (2004)
- Forgotten Heroes (2005)
- Black Fire – violin concerto (2006)
- Fanfares & Celebrations (2007)
- Fields of Remembrance (2008)
- Heritage Suite (What Hope Saw) (2009)
- Their Finest Hour (2010)
- Earthrise [transcription by Nigel Clarke] (2012)
- The Flavour of Tears "Trumpet & Band (2nd movement of 'Mysteries of the Horizon')" [transcription by Nigel Clarke] (2013)
- Storm Surge (2013)
- Old World Overture (2014)
- A Richer Dust (Symphony No.1 for Speaker & Wind Orchestra) (2014/2015) Text: Malene Sheppard Skaerved
- Mysteries of the Horizon - Trumpet/Cornet Concerto for Wind Orchestra – [transcription by Nigel Clarke] (2015)
- Outrageous Fortune (Symphony No.2) - Trombone, Actor' & Wind Orchestra (2016)
- Christina's Memory Garden (Symphony No.3) - Soprano, Trumpet, Storytellers & Symphonic Wind Orchestra Text: Malene Sheppard Skaerved (2017)
- Dial `H' for Hitchcock [reimagined by Nigel Clarke] (2019)
- La Fleur en Papier Doré [The Golden Paper Flower] (2019)
- The Black Madonna & The Blue Forest (2020)

Educational

- Featuring Rhythm – treble & bass clef brass instruments (1989)
- Sketches from Don Quixote Trombone (or tuba) and piano (1992)

Original Motion Picture Scores (Co-written with Michael Csanyi Wills)

- Jinnah (1998)
- The Little Vampire (2000)
- The Little Polar Bear (2001)
- Rocket Post (2004)
- Baseline (2010)
- Will (2014)

Book contributions

- Verlag, Linda Merrick. "Collaboration between Composers and Performers"
- Miles, Tim and Westcombe, John. Music & Dyslexia: Opening News Doors.
- Miles, Tim; Ditchfield, Diane; and Westcombe, John.Music & Dyslexia: A Positive Approach.
