= Peter Sheppard Skærved =

Peter Sheppard Skærved (born 1966) Violinist and violist, is the dedicatee of over 150 new works. He has collaborated with composers Nigel Clarke, David Matthews, Michael Finnissy, Hans Werner Henze, George Rochberg, Michael Alec Rose, William Bolcom, Dmitri Smirnov, Jörg Widmann and John Wall. He leads the Kreutzer Quartet, and has cultivated duo-partnerships with pianists including Aaron Shorr, Jan Philip Schulze, Daniel-Ben Pienaar and David Owen Norris, and the fortepianist and harpsichordist Julian Perkins.
