= Phoebe Wright =

British embroiderer and designer

- her designs on a State Bed
- Born: prob. Phoebe Holmes c. 1710s
- Died: November 1778; Great Newport Street

Phoebe Wright maybe born Phoebe Holmes (c. 1710s – November 1778) was a British embroiderer and designer. She founded and operated the "Royal School of embroidering females".

== Life ==
Her early life is unknown. It is known that she married and that her name became Wright and that they separated. The main evidence of her family is a will that she wrote, probably before 1752. From that will it has been surmised that she had brothers named Benjamin and James Holmes. James married in 1742; he wove silk and gauze at his business in Cheapside. Benjamin was also in textiles as he made hosiery and gloves. Benjamin was to receive the major items which were a steel grate, her bed, some mahogany chairs and a table.

The first known reference to her embroidery concerns a comment made about Caroline Fox, 1st Baroness Holland who was present at the celebrations for the Prince of Wales's birthday. The correspondent Mary Pendarves (became Delany) wrote to her sister on 29 November 1742 in which she notes that Lady Caroline Lenox (later Baroness Holland) wore the finest clothes of "gold and colours on white, embroidered by Mrs Wright".

Two years later she is noted in a trade dictionary among a group of designers of woven silk; she is known for the "correctness and elegancy of her drawing and her colouring".

Her business was called the "Royal School of embroidering females" which was in her home in Great Newport Street. It was founded in 1760 and funded by Queen Charlotte and girls would be apprenticed there for two to three years. Wright was unusual because she made and manufactured the embroidery as others would employ an artist.

== Death and legacy ==
Wright died in Great Newport Street in November 1778. Her niece Nancy took over her business. Nancy appears to have worked from home in Bedford. There are now no known surviving examples of her work; however there is an example of her designs. Henry Arundell, 8th Baron Arundell of Wardour had a set of church vestments made in Rome in 1777. These were embroidered in designs made by Wright and they are preserved at Wardour Castle in Wiltshire.

The Royal Collection also has a "State Bed" that was installed at Windsor in 1772. The embroidery designs are credited to Phoebe Wright but the headboard in particular was embroidered by her niece Nancy Pawsey, as her needlework was thought to be the best.
