= Kreutzer Quartet =

British string quartet

The Kreutzer Quartet is a British string quartet.

With their selected programs they have given concerts in Italy, Germany, France, Holland, Serbia, Montenegro, Sardinia, the United States, Spain, Cyprus, Poland and Lithuania.

A further focus is the critical examination of not only recordings of classical works, but above all of contemporary string quartets by Robert Gerhard, Michael Finnissy, Harrison Birtwistle, Gloria Coates, Michael Tippett and Hafliði Hallgrímsson. There exist recordings on the labels Metier, Naxos, NMC Recordings, Chandos, Guild and New Focus.

== Members ==
- Peter Sheppard Skærved (violin)
- Mihailo Trandafilovski, and before Gordon MacKay (violin)
- Clifton Harrison, and before Morgan Goff (alto)
- Neil Heyde (cello)

== Recordings ==
- Kreutzer Quartet (2002) – Gloria Coates: String Quartets Nos. 1, 5, 6 (Naxos 8.559091)
- Kreutzer Quartet (2003) – Gloria Coates: String Quartets Nos. 2, 3, 4, 7 and 8 (Naxos 8.559152)
- Kreutzer Quartet (2010) – Gloria Coates: String Quartet No. 9, Solo Violin Sonata, Lyric Suite for piano trio (Naxos 8.559666)
- Kreutzer Quartet – Gloria Coates – String Quartets Nos. 1–9 (3-CD-Box-Set) (Naxos 8.503240)
- Kreutzer Quartet (2008) – Thomas Simaku: String Quartets Nos. 2 and 3, Soliloquy I–III (Naxos 8.570428)
- Tapestry – chamber music by Elliott Schwartz (Metier msv 28537)
- Grieg and Finnissy – Piano Quintets (first recording); Roderick Chadwick (piano); Kreutzer Quartett (Metier msv 28541)
- Michael Finnissy – String Quartets Nos. 2 and 3 (NMC Recordings D180)
