= Roddymoor =

Village in England

Coordinates: 54°43′41″N 1°45′33″W

Roddymoor is a village in County Durham, in England. In the 2001 census Roddymoor had a population of 500.

== Location ==
It is situated to the north of Crook. Built to service the Peases West cokeworks and the coal mines situated around the village, it is predominantly a red-brick village, with the exception of Dale Terrace, High Terrace and East Terrace which, although red brick, was a private street and not part of the council estate.

Since the closure of the only employers, the pits and Peases paint factory (now a private residence), it is now a dormitory village.

The nearest pubs are in Billy Row, or a walk up the track following the old tubline and over the railway line closed by Beeching to the Old Dun Cow, perennially known as the "Cowtail".

The nearest town is Crook, a 20-minute walk or a 5-minute bus ride.
