= The Salvation Army, Canada =

Christian church

The Salvation Army in Canada
- Classification: Christian
- Orientation: Holiness movement
- Governance: The Governing Council of the Salvation Army in Canada
- Associations: Canadian Council of Churches; World Communion of Reformed Churches; World Council of Churches
- Region: Canada (plus Bermuda)
- Headquarters: 2 Overlea Blvd, Toronto, Ontario
- Origin: 1882 (in Canada) 1865 (in London, England)
- Branched from: The Salvation Army
- Members: 15,743 soldiers 30,115 adherents
- Ministers: 611 active officers
- Places of worship: 285 corps (community churches)
- Official website: salvationarmy.ca

The Salvation Army in Canada (nicknamed "Sally Ann"; French: Armée du salut) is the administrative division of The Salvation Army, a Christian church, serving Canada and Bermuda. The Salvation Army was formed in 1865 in London, England, and it began working in Canada in 1882. Today, it operates in 400 communities across Canada and Bermuda. The Salvation Army Archives are in Toronto, and the Salvation Army's Training College is located in Territorial Headquarters in Toronto (formerly in Winnipeg).

== Governance ==
The Salvation Army in Canada is divided geographically into four divisions – Atlantic Division (Quebec, Bermuda, Nova Scotia, Newfoundland and Labrador, Prince Edward Island, and New Brunswick), Prairies and Northern Territories Division (Alberta, Saskatchewan, Manitoba, Yukon, Northwest Territories, and Nunavut), Ontario Division, and British Columbia Division. Each division is headed by a divisional commander, who is responsible to the Territorial Commander. In turn, the Territorial Commander is responsible to International Headquarters (IHQ) in London, England.

The Territorial Commander (TC) and Chief Secretary are appointed by the General. Their role is to oversee and administer the work of The Salvation Army within their territory. They are assisted by various other Secretaries (departmental heads) who are, in turn, responsible for overseeing their various branches of Army activity.

The Territorial Commander is responsible for the territory's overall operation and mission, and the Chief Secretary is responsible for the territory's administration and daily operations. Senior executive officers are, on the recommendation of the Territorial Commander, also appointed by the General. All other officer appointments within a territory are the responsibility of the Territorial Commander and the Cabinet.

The Salvation Army in Canada is a non-governmental direct provider of social services in the areas of homelessness, poverty and addiction, and a continuing support for programs in developing countries. In addition to mobile programs such as disaster relief, and homeless soup lines, the Salvation Army in Canada currently operates permanent facilities including corps community centers (churches), Social Services Centers, summer camps, Adult Rehabilitation Centers, and thrift stores.

== History ==
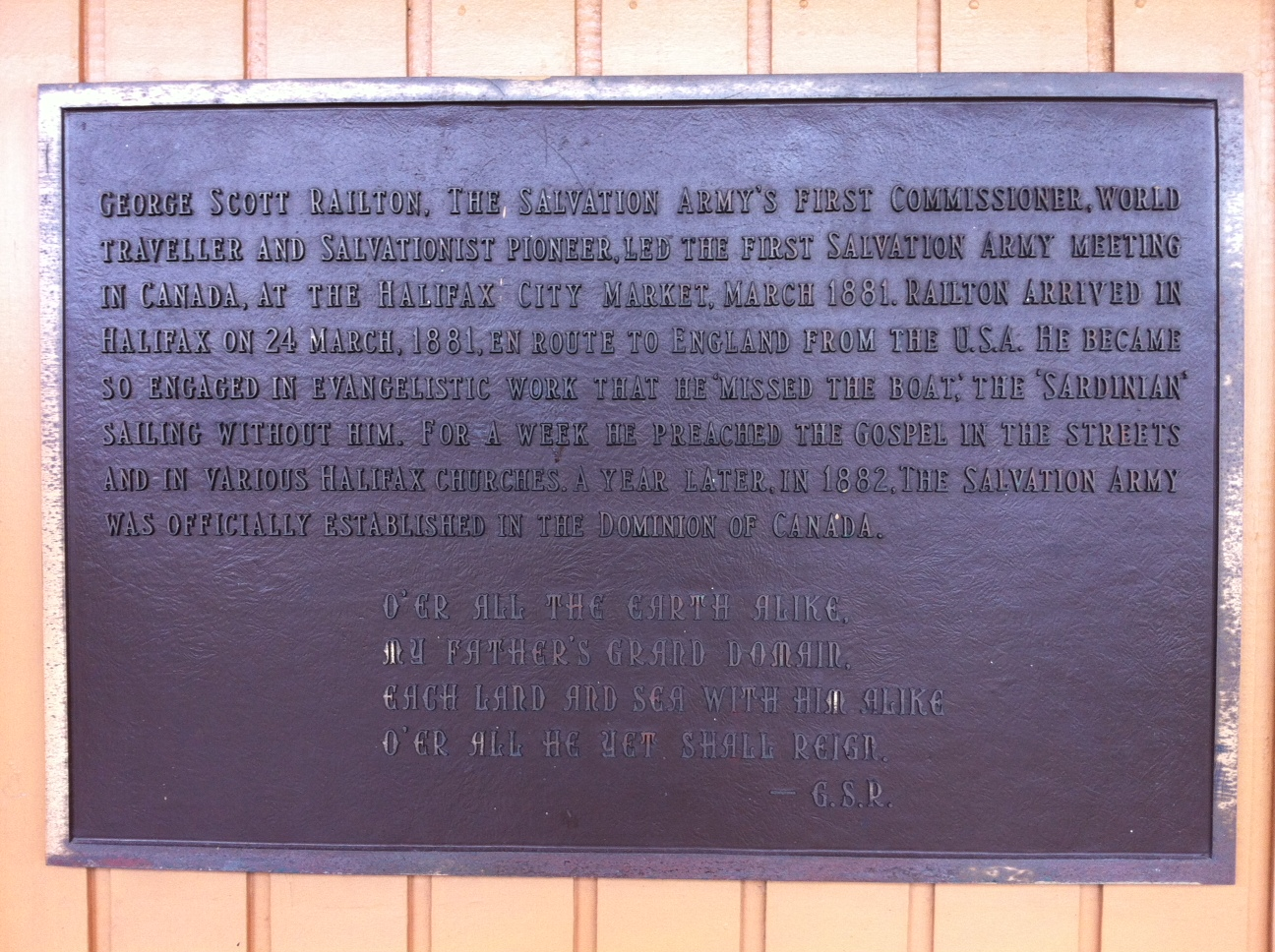
1st Salvation Army meeting in Canada Plaque, Stayner's Wharf, Halifax, Nova Scotia

En route to England, George Scott Railton stopped at the port of Halifax, Nova Scotia, and held the first Salvation Army meeting in Canada on March 24, 1881. He was so engaged in his sermon that he missed his boat to England. He preached in Halifax for the following week at various Halifax churches, and a year later, the Salvation Army was officially established in Canada.

The Salvation Army began operating in Canada in 1882. Brigadier Gideon Miller (1866–1949), Staff Architect for the Salvation Army in Canada from April 1906 until 1931, designed meeting halls (often called 'citadels'), hospitals and hostels in cities and towns across Canada.

In 1886, only four years after it had come to Canada from England, the Salvation Army built its Territorial Headquarters for Canada and Bermuda. It also housed the Toronto Temple, built in 1886 and demolished in 1954.

Arnold Brown (December 13, 1913 – June 26, 2002), the 11th General of The Salvation Army (1977–1981), served as Territorial Commander in 1974. Brown compiled a history of the first 50 years of Salvation Army ministry in Canada, entitled What Hath God Wrought?.

== Canadian Staff Band ==
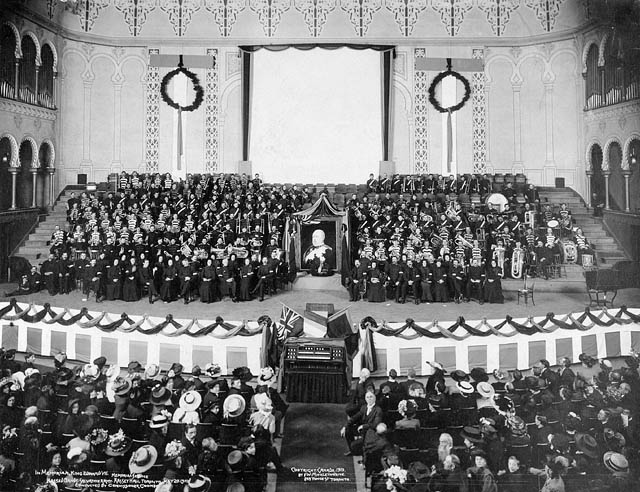
The massed bands of the Salvation Army, Canada performed at Massey Hall in Toronto in 1910 In Memoriam King Edward VII.

Beginning in the 1880s, Salvation Army brass bands began to be established in Canada, copying similar trends in the United Kingdom at the time. In 1888, Territorial Commander Thomas Coombs issued an advertisement for Salvation Army bandsmen to form a "Household Troops" band, which would eventually become the first Canadian Staff Band.

In May of 1914, the Canadian Staff Band departed Toronto for an International Congress of The Salvation Army in London, England. The band was travelling on the RMS Empress of Ireland when it sank in the Saint Lawrence River shortly after its departure from Quebec City. While a group of survivors briefly attempted to reform the band in 1917, the band eventually ceased to exist.

In 1969, the Canadian Staff Band was revived under the leadership of bandmaster Major Norman Bearcroft. The band participates in most major territorial events, has recorded many albums, and frequently visits local Salvation Army churches across Canada and Bermuda, and abroad.

== List of former Canadian Generals ==
- Clarence Wiseman (June 19, 1907 – May 4, 1985) was the 10th General of The Salvation Army from 1974 to 1977
- Arnold Brown (December 13, 1913 – June 26, 2002) was the 11th General of The Salvation Army from 1977 to 1981
- Bramwell Tillsley (August 18, 1931 – November 2, 2019) was the 14th General of The Salvation Army from 1993 to 1994
- Linda Bond (born June 22, 1946) was the 19th General of The Salvation Army from 2011 to 2013
- Brian Peddle (born August 8, 1957) was the 21st General of The Salvation Army from 2018 to 2023

== Salvation Army buildings ==
=== British Columbia Division ===
- Salvation Army in Kelowna
- Cascade Community Church in Abbotsford
- The Center of Hope in Abbotsford
- Chilliwack Community Church in Chilliwack
- Addictions and Rehabilitation Centre in Victoria
- Sunset Lodge in Victoria
- High Point Community Church in Victoria
- Connections Point Church and Resource Centre in Langford
- Belkin House in Vancouver
- Harbour Light in Vancouver
- Grace Mansion in Vancouver
- New Westminster Citadel in New Westminster

=== Ontario Division ===
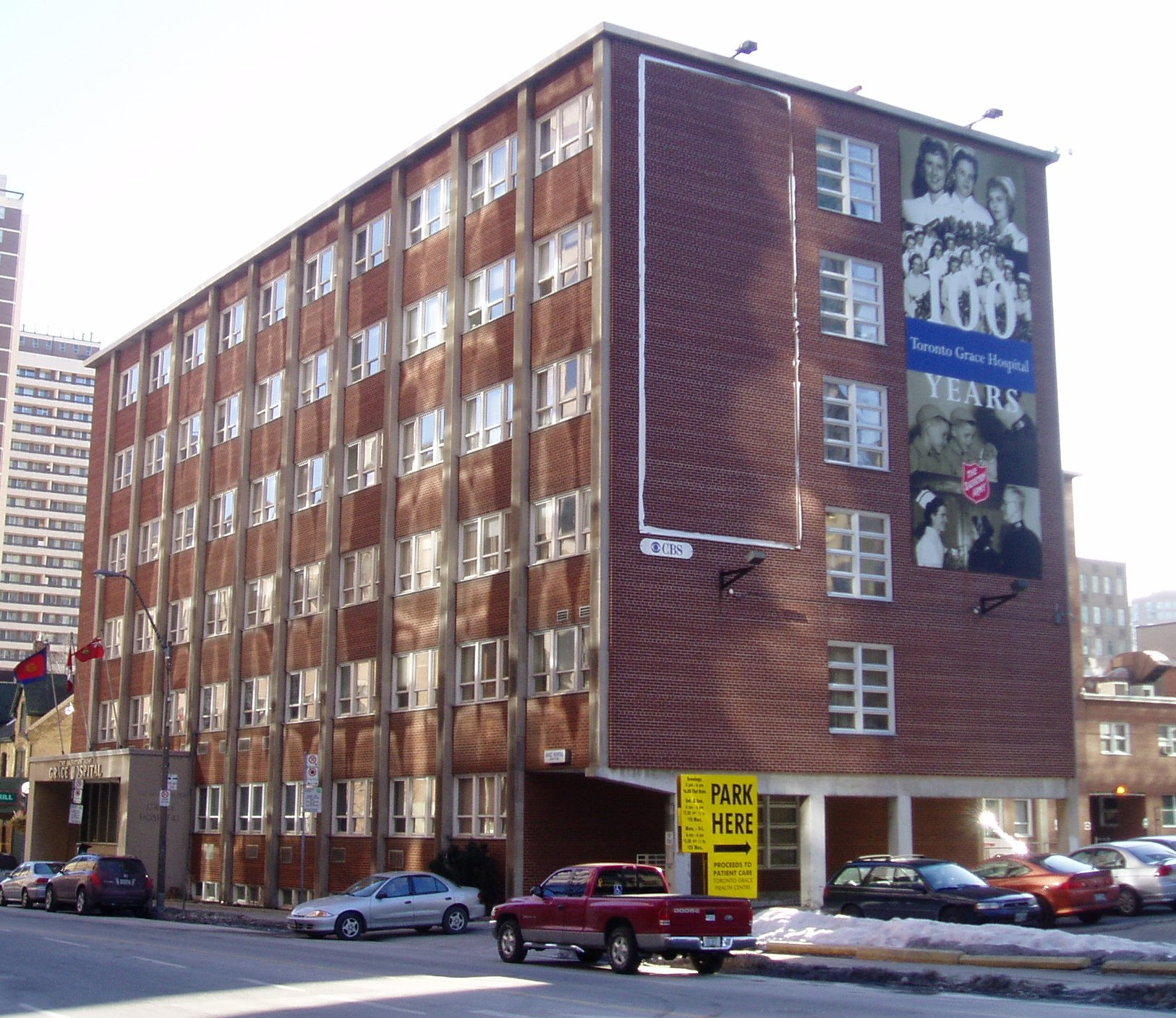
Toronto Grace Hospital (2005)

- The Salvation Army Church in Oshawa 570 Thornton Road N Oshawa Ontario.
- Salvation Army Citadels in Ottawa, Ontario: Slater Street near Bank Street, c. 1904
- Maternity Hospital for the Salvation Army, in Ottawa, Ontario c. 1920
- Salvation Army Citadel, Kingston, Ontario, Princess Street, c. 1920
- Salvation Army Citadels in Toronto, Ontario: Davenport Road, 1907 Dovercourt Road, 1910; Lisgar Street, 1911; Parliament Street at Coatsworth Street, 1912; Dufferin Street near St. Clair Avenue West, 1921
- Salvation Army Men's Hostel, Victoria Street at Dundas Street East, Toronto, Ontario 1909
- lodging house for the Salvation Army, Queen Street East, Toronto, Ontario c. 1913
- Booth Memorial Training College & Home, Davisville Avenue, Toronto, Ontario c. 1915
- Salvation Army Citadel in Stratford, Ontario, c. 1912
- Salvation Army Citadel in London, Ontario c. 1916-17
- Bethesda Maternity Hospital, Riverview Avenue, London, Ontario c. 1920
- Salvation Army Citadel, St. Catharines, Ontario, Geneva Street, c. 1920
- Grace Hospital for the Salvation Army, London Avenue West at Crawford Avenue, Windsor, Ontario c. 1920
- Salvation Army Citadel, Welland, Ontario, Cross Street at Division Street, c. 1920
- Salvation Army Citadel, Sudbury, Ontario, Larch Street, c. 1920
- Salvation Army Citadel, Sault Ste Marie, Ontario, Spring Street at Queen Street East, c. 1920
- Salvation Army Citadel, Woodstock, Ontario

=== Prairies and Northern Territories Division ===
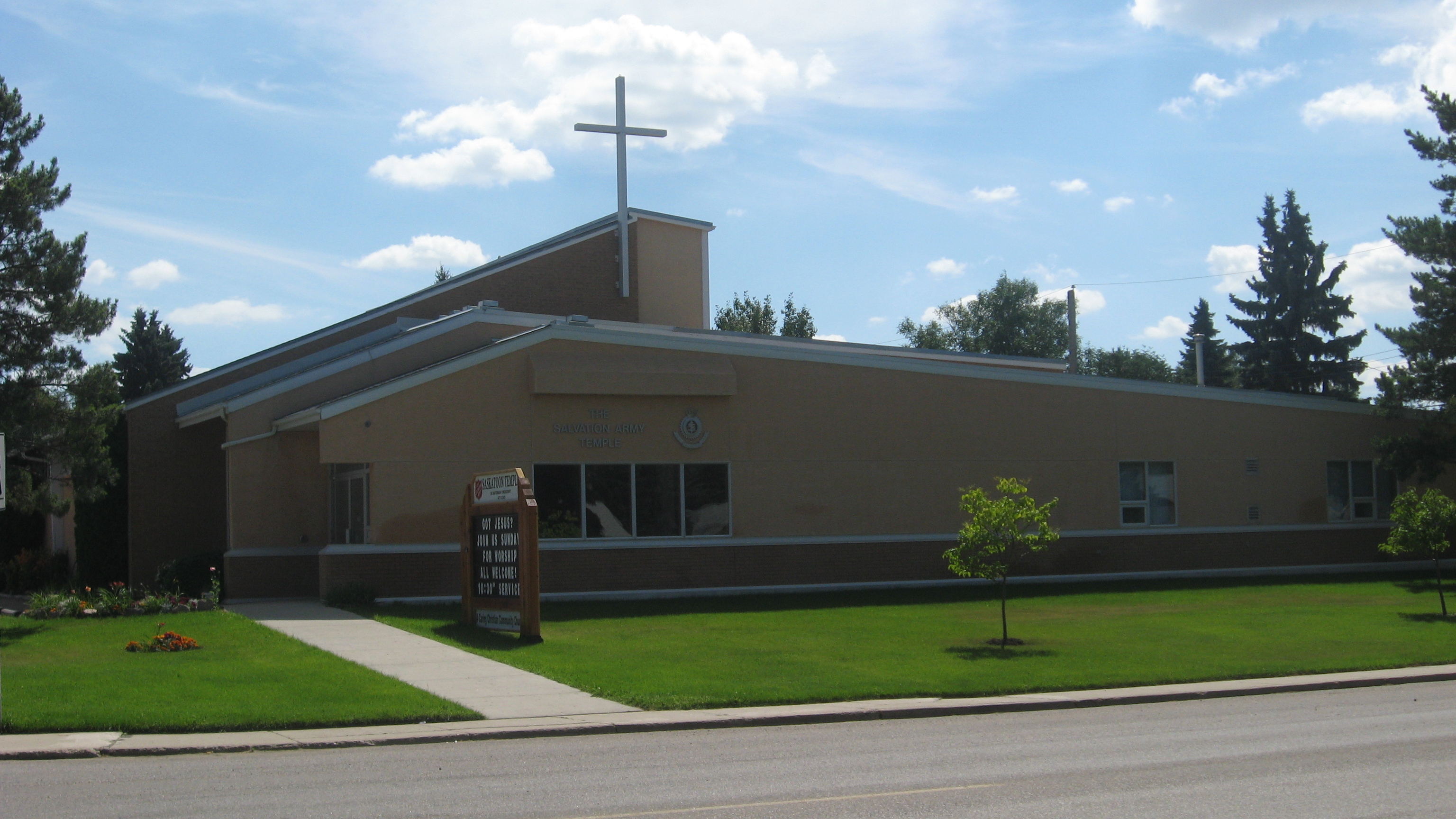
Salvation Army Saskatoon Temple (Church), Main Street, Saskatoon, Saskatchewan

- Salvation Army Citadel Corps, Brandon, Manitoba, 1887
- Salvation Army Grace Hospital, Winnipeg, Manitoba 1909
- Salvation Army Sunset Lodge, Main Street, Winnipeg, Manitoba 1911
- Salvation Army Citadel, Winnipeg, Manitoba 1912
- Salvation Army Temple, Saskatoon, Saskatchewan, 20th Street, 1912. Main Street, Current.
- Salvation Army Citadel, Moosejaw, Saskatchewan, High Street East, c. 1920
- Salvation Army Citadel in Calgary, Alberta, 1st Street East near 7th Avenue, c. 1920

=== Atlantic Division ===
- Salvation Army Citadels in Montreal, Quebec: St. Alexander Street, 1908; De Montigny Street, 1908; Bourgeois Street, 1908; Adam Street, 1928
- Booth Memorial Hospital, Outremont Avenue, Montreal, Quebec 1913
- Salvation Army Citadel, Quebec, Quebec, 1908
- Maternity Hospital for the Salvation Army, Halifax, Nova Scotia, 1919
- The Wiseman Centre, 714 Water St, St. John's, NL
- Ches Penney Centre of Hope, 18 Springdale St, St. John's, NL

== See also ==
- Chief of the Staff of The Salvation Army
- Generals of The Salvation Army
- High Council of The Salvation Army
- Officer of The Salvation Army
- The Salvation Army
- Soldier of The Salvation Army
