= The Salvation Army U.S.A. Western Territory =

Western Administrative Unit of the Salvation Army

The Salvation Army U.S.A. Western Territory is an administrative unit of The Salvation Army that serves the thirteen Western United States, the Marshall Islands, the Federated States of Micronesia and Guam. The territory is one of four Salvation Army Territories within the United States of America. The Western Territorial Headquarters is located in Rancho Palos Verdes, California, and is currently under the leadership of Commissioner Douglas Riley. The territory is divided geographically into nine divisions, each headed by a divisional commander.

In addition to mobile programs such as disaster relief, and homeless soup lines, the Salvation Army U.S.A. Western Territory currently operates hundreds of permanent facilities including 307 Corps community centers, 31 Adult Rehabilitation Centers, 13 summer camps, 36 Silvercrest Residences, and 6 adult day care centers. The territory runs its own accredited, two-year college in Rancho Palos Verdes, CA. The Salvation Army College for Officer Training is dedicated to the education of those individuals who desire to become full-time leaders or officers in the Army's ranks. The Salvation Army Museum of the West is a Salvation Army history museum and archive, operated by the territory. The territory also publishes a weekly newspaper, The New Frontier, and a quarterly social-services magazine, Caring.

== Origins ==
The roots of the Western Territory date back to the summer of 1882. At this time there was no Salvation Army presence in the Western United States, the movement only having reached the United States two years earlier on March 10, 1880. However, a group of Bay Area "holiness men," having been impressed by a copy of the Army's London based War Cry magazine, decided by unanimous vote that they would change their name from the Pacific Holiness Association to The Salvation Army. They then chose George Newton as their "Commander," and held their first meeting later that year on October 6, 1882.

Over the course of the next year the group held services, formed a small brass band, and even published five issues of their own War Cry magazine, all the while petitioning the Salvation Army's founder and international leader William Booth to send them a real Salvation Army officer. Booth eventually agreed, and in 1883 Major Alfred Wells, and Major Henry Stillwell were sent to begin the Army's work in San Francisco. Major Wells opened the Army's first building in the West, San Francisco Citadel #1, on July 21, 1883.

Originally, the Western United States was classified as the Pacific Coast Division, but in 1921 was given territorial status. The West's first territorial commander was Lt. Commissioner Adam Gifford.

== Western Territorial Commanders ==
- 1920 -- Lt. Commissioner Adam Gifford
- 1932 -- Lt. Commissioner Benjamine Orames
- 1940 -- Lt. Commissioner Donald McMillan
- 1944 -- Lt. Commissioner William Barrett
- 1948 -- Lt. Commissioner Claude Bates
- 1952 -- Lt. Commissioner Claude Bates
- 1953 -- Lt. Commissioner Holland French
- 1957 -- Lt. Commissioner Samuel Hepburn
- 1961 -- Commissioner Samuel Hepburn
- 1962 -- Lt. Commissioner Glen Ryan
- 1966 -- Lt. Commissioner William J. Parkins
- 1971 -- Commissioner Paul S. Kaiser
- 1974 -- Commissioner Richard E. Holz
- 1980 -- Commissioner Lawrence R. Smith
- 1982 -- Commissioner William Pratt
- 1984 -- Commissioner Willard S. Evans
- 1989 -- Commissioner Paul A. Rader
- 1994 -- Commissioner Peter H. Chang
- 1997 -- Commissioner David Edwards
- 2002 -- Commissioner Linda Bond
- 2004 Interim -- Commissioner Bill Luttrell
- 2005 -- Commissioner Philip Swyers
- 2010 -- Commissioner James Knaggs
- 2017 -- Commissioner Kenneth G. Hodder
- 2020 -- Commissioner Douglas Riley
- 2026 -- Commissioner James Betts

== Divisions of the Western Territory ==
1. Alaska Division
2. Southern California Division*
3. Cascade Division
4. Del Oro Division
5. Golden State Division
6. Hawaiian and Pacific Islands Division
7. Intermountain Division
8. Northwest Division
9. Southwest Division
- formerly: Sierra Del Mar Division and Southern California Division

== See also ==
- Chief of the Staff of The Salvation Army
- Generals of The Salvation Army
- High Council of The Salvation Army
- Officer (The Salvation Army)
- Soldier (The Salvation Army)
- The Salvation Army
- The Salvation Army U.S.A Central Territory

== Sources ==
- McKinley, E.H. (1995). Marching to Glory: The History of the Salvation Army in the United States, 1880-1992. Eerdmans Pub Co. ISBN 0-8028-3761-1.
- Taiz, Lillian (2001). Hallelujah Lads and Lasses: Remaking the Salvation Army in America, 1880-1930. University of North Carolina Press. ISBN 0-8078-2621-9.
- Walker, Pamela J. (2001). Pulling the Devil's Kingdom Down: The Salvation Army in Victorian Britain. University of California Press. ISBN 0-520-22591-0.
- Winston, Diane (2000). Red-Hot and Righteous: The Urban Religion of the Salvation Army. Harvard University Press. ISBN 0-674-00396-9.
