= Earle Maxwell =

Salvation Army officer

Commissioner Earle Maxwell
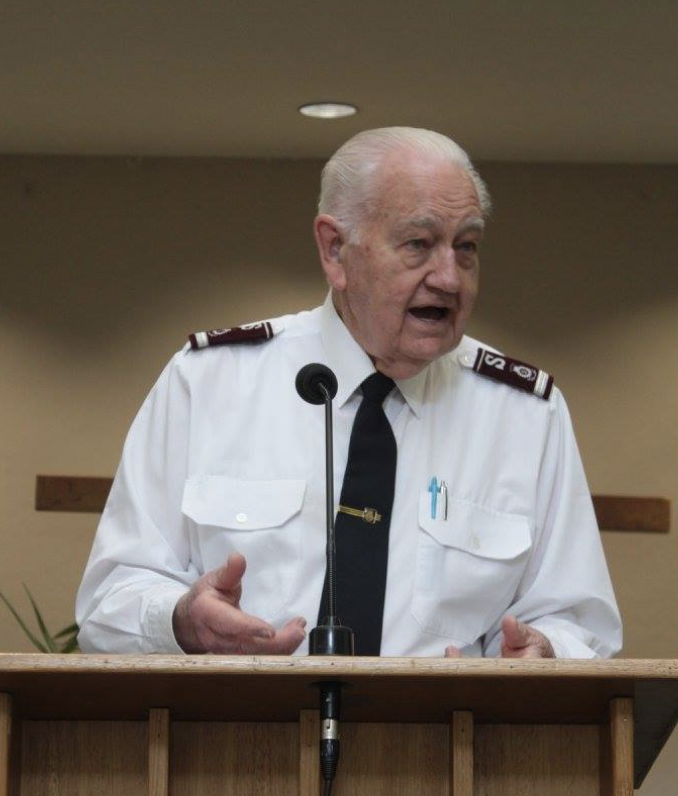
- Maxwell speaking in 2017

Acting General of the Salvation Army
- In office 18 May 1994 – 23 July 1994
- Preceded by: Bramwell Tillsley (as general)
- Succeeded by: Paul Rader (as general)

19th Chief of the Staff
- In office 9 July 1993 – 23 July 1999
- General: Bramwell Tillsley; Paul Rader
- Preceded by: Bramwell Tillsley
- Succeeded by: John Larsson

Personal details
- Born: July 8, 1934 (age 91) New South Wales, Australia
- Spouse(s): Wilma Cugley (m. 1957-2022; her death)

Earle Maxwell (born July 8, 1934) is an Australian minister and Salvation Army officer who served as the 19th Chief of the Staff of The Salvation Army from 1993 to 1999, as well as the acting General of the Salvation Army in 1994.

== Personal life ==
Maxwell was born 8 July 1934 in New South Wales, Australia. He was the son of Salvation Army officers who attained the rank of brigadier by their retirement. He attended Sydney Technical High School and left home at age 14 to begin a career in banking at the Australia and New Zealand Banking Group. He entered the Salvation Army's school for officer training in 1953 just before he turned 20 and was commissioned as a lieutenant in 1954. He was married to Wilma Cugley in 1957 until her death in 2022. He received the honorary title of "Fellow" by CPA Australia in 2012.

== Career ==
Maxwell served as the corps officer between 1954 and 1974. Beginning in 1974 with the rank of major, he served in various roles as a finance director and divisional commander. He later earned the rank of lieutenant colonel as finance secretary. Upon his promotion to commissioner, Maxwell became the territorial commander of the Singapore and Malaysia Command followed by the Philippines territory and the New Zealand, Fiji, and Tonga territory.

In 1993, newly elected General Bramwell Tillsley appointed Maxwell to be the Chief of the Staff at international headquarters in London. Within a year, Tillsley became extremely ill and suddenly resigned as general. As required by the Salvation Army Act 1980, Maxwell summoned the High Council of The Salvation Army, whose purpose was to elect a successor for Tillsley. Because there was no incumbent general, per the act of 1980, Maxwell served as acting general from the date of Tillsley's resignation, 18 May 1994, until Paul Rader was elected general 23 July 1994. Maxwell retired from The Salvation Army in 1999.

=== Appointments ===
Australian Eastern Territory

- Broken Hill, corps officer (1954)
- East Maitland, corps officer (1956)
- Dalby in Queensland, corps officer (1957)
- Manly in Sydney, corps officer (1959)
- Rockhampton, corps officer (1963)
- Townsville, corps officer (1966)
- Brisbane Temple, corps officer (1969)
- Territorial Headquarters in Sydney, finance department (1974)
- Canberra, divisional commander (1976)
- Brisbane, divisional commander (1978)

Singapore and Malaysia Command

- Territorial commander (1979)

Australian Eastern Territory

- Territorial Headquarters in Sydney, finance secretary (1983)

The Philippines Territory

- Territorial commander (1986)

New Zealand, Fiji, and Tonga Territory

- Territorial commander (1990)

International Headquarters

- Chief of the Staff of The Salvation Army in London (1993)

=== Further reading ===
- The Master's Plan: The life and legacy of Commissioners Earle and Wilma Maxwell by Graham Durston, ASIN B09RD9WN53
