= Edward Hill (Salvation Army officer) =

Salvation Army officer

Commissioner Edward Hill
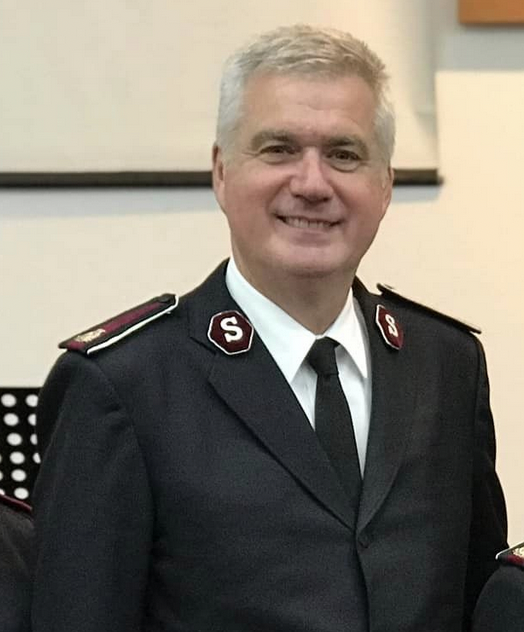

28th Chief of the Staff
- Incumbent
- Assumed office 3 August 2023
- General: Lyndon Buckingham
- Preceded by: Lyndon Buckingham

Personal details
- Born: United States
- Spouse: Shelley Hill
- Education: Northwest Nazarene University, Master of Divinity Azusa Pacific University, (M.A.) California State University, (B.A.)

Edward Hill is an American minister and Salvation Army officer with the rank of commissioner who serves as the 28th Chief of the Staff of The Salvation Army. He assumed office on 3 August 2023 and serves under the leadership of General Lyndon Buckingham.

== Career ==
Hill was commissioned in 1993 as an officer in The Salvation Army along with his wife, Shelley. He began his career in Hawaii as a corps officer of the Leeward Corps in Aiea, Oahu. In 1995, the Hills were appointed as the divisional youth leaders of the Hawaiian and Pacific Islands Division, which includes Hawaii, the Republic of the Marshall Islands, The Federated States of Micronesia, and Guam and Saipan. In 1998, they were appointed to serve in various roles at The Salvation Army College for Officer Training. From 2002-2008, the Hills served as the corps officers of the Pasadena Tabernacle Corps. In 2008, then-Majors Hill returned to the Hawaiian and Pacific Islands as the divisional leaders. In 2012, the Hills were appointed to serve as The USA Western Territory Headquarters, with Edward in the role of secretary for program.

In 2016, Hill was sent to the Singapore, Malaysia and Myanmar Territory to serve as chief secretary. In 2018 he was appointed to the same role in the Canada and Bermuda Territory. In 2021, Hill was appointed by General Brian Peddle to serve as the International Secretary for the Americas and Caribbean Zone, located at the Salvation Army's International Headquarters in London. He has supported efforts of The Salvation Army to address modern slavery and human trafficking, increased sustainability, and confront the issues of poverty, homelessness, and addiction. He was appointed by General-elect Lyndon Buckingham to become the 28th Chief of the Staff of the Salvation Army and assumed office on 3 August 2023 as required by the Salvation Army Act 1980 passed by the Parliament of the United Kingdom.

Hill earned a Master of Divinity from Northwest Nazarene University, a Master of Arts degree in Christian Education from Azusa Pacific University and a Bachelor of Arts degree in history from California State University at Fullerton.

=== Appointments ===
USA Western Territory

- Corps officer (Leeward Corps), Hawaiian and Pacific Islands Division (1993)
- Divisional youth leader, Hawaiian and Pacific Islands Division (1995)
- Field Training Officer; Director of Curriculum; Dean for the School of Continuing Education, Salvation Army College for Officer Training at Crestmont, California (1998)
- Corps officer (Pasadena Tabernacle Corps), Southern California Division (2002)
- Divisional commander of the Hawaii and Pacific Islands Division (2008)
- Secretary for Program, USA Western Territory Headquarters (2012)

Singapore, Malaysia and Myanmar Territory

- Chief secretary of the Singapore, Malaysia, Myanmar, and Thailand Territory, Singapore (2016); Principal of the School for Officer Training

Canada and Bermuda Territory

- Chief secretary of the Canada and Bermuda Territory, Ontario (2018)

International Headquarters

- International Secretary for the Americas and Caribbean Zone, London, England (2021)
- Chief of the Staff, London (2023)

== Personal life ==
Edward Hill has been married to Shelley since 1985 and has three children.
