= Sunbury Court =

Historic building in Surrey, England

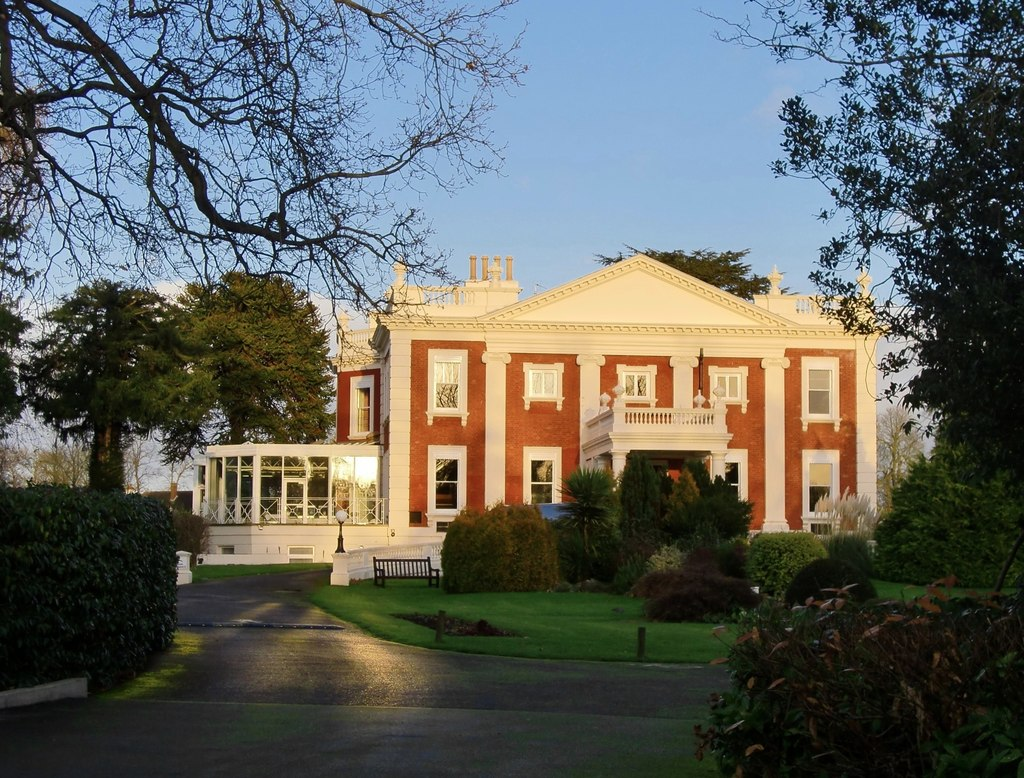
- Sunbury Court (South West elevation).
- Interactive map of Sunbury Court
- Location: Sunbury-on-Thames, Surrey
- Coordinates: 51°24′35″N 0°23′45″W
- Built: 1723
- Built for: John Witt
- Current use: The Salvation Army
- Owner: The Salvation Army

Sunbury Court is a historic building in Sunbury-on-Thames, Surrey, England. Since the 1920s the court has been owned by The Salvation Army and has been the meeting place of the High Council of The Salvation Army

== History ==
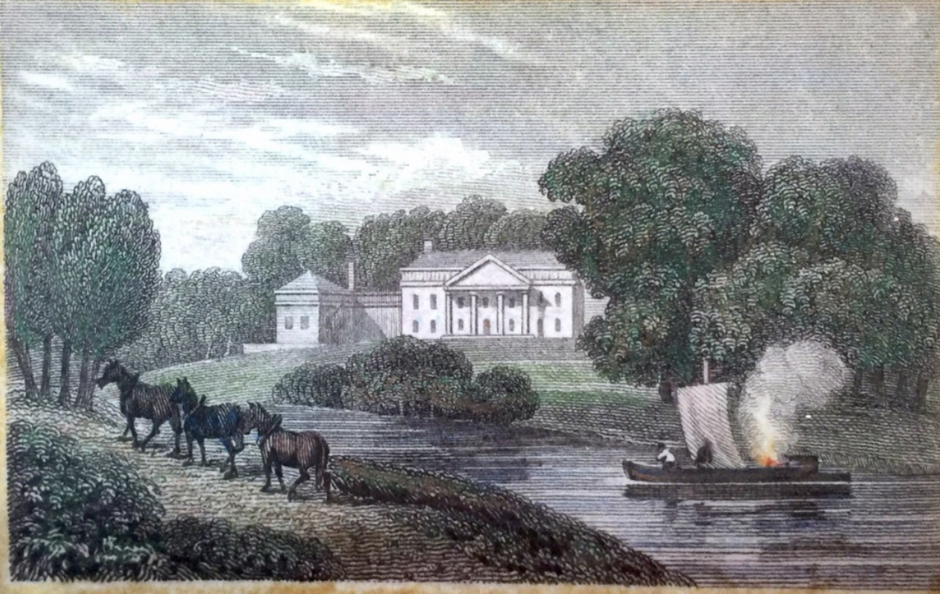
Sunbury Court c. 1750

The grounds used to be part of a larger estate that contained the Royal Manor of Kempton, a mansion frequented by Henry III, Edward I, and Edward II in the 13th and 14th centuries. But the Royal Manon of Kempton was destroyed in 1374.

In 1723 John Witt built the structure that exists today. The estate expanded more than one hundred acres along the Thames River. Witt sold the estate in 1735, and again in 1751 and 1755 by Anna Maria Delegard. In 1764 Delegard married George Fermor, who took ownership of the court until 1799. Between 1799 and 1863, the owners of the court refurbished the estate, including adding new wings to the building. Sunbury Court's last private owner was William Horatio Harfield. After Hatfield's death, the property was vacant for two decades until The Salvation Army purchased the property in 1921.

== Salvation Army ownership ==
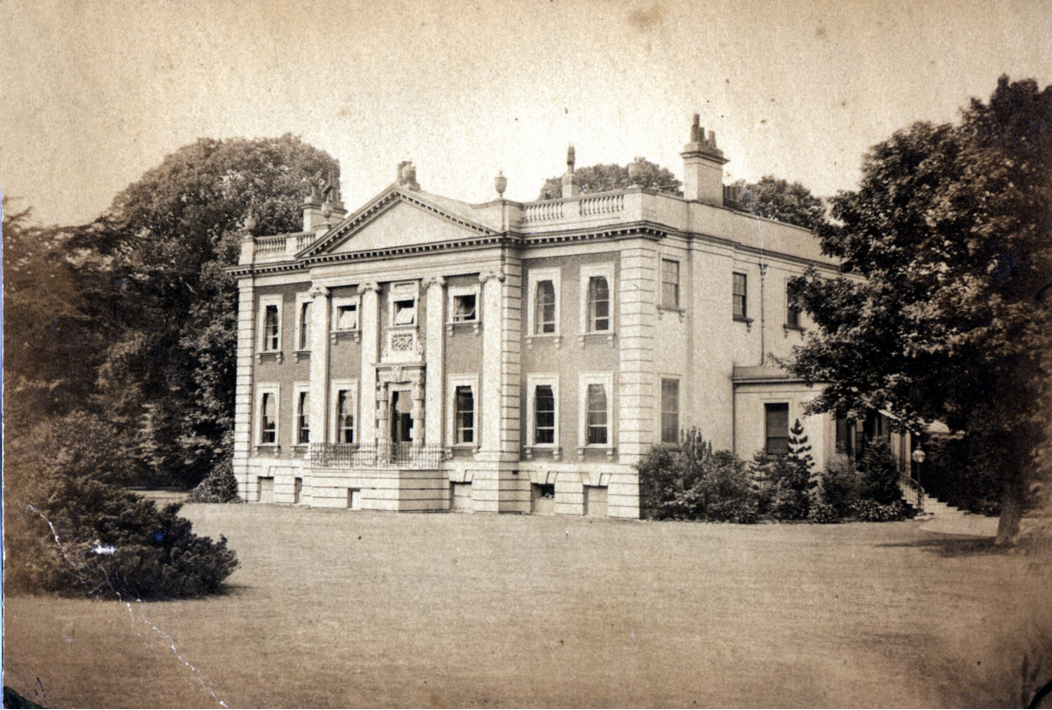
Sunbury Court shortly after purchase by the Salvation Army

The Salvation Army uses the venue to host the High Council, a group whose sole purpose is to elect the General of the Salvation Army. British law requires that the High Council meets in the United Kingdom, although it does not specify where. The first High Council met at Sunbury Court in 1929 for the purpose of determining whether General Bramwell Booth was unfit to remain general (or leader of the organisation) after he had fallen ill. The most recent High Council met in May 2023 and elected Lyndon Buckingham as general of the Salvation Army. All of the Army's High Councils have been held at Sunbury court except to elect generals Evangeline Booth in 1934, George Carpenter in 1939, and Andre Cox in 2013.

Outside the High Council, the court serves as a conference center for Salvation Army activities. In the 1990s, the Army expanded the court by adding an additional board room and housing for guests.

In 1961 Emil Soderstrom authored a marched titled "Sunbury Court," in honor of the court.
