= John Allan (Salvation Army officer) =

Salvation Army officer

Commissioner John Allan OO, CG

8th Chief of the Staff
- In office 1947–1953
- General: Albert Orsborn
- Preceded by: Charles Baugh
- Succeeded by: Edgar Dibden

The General's Special Delegate
- In office 1953–1957
- General: Albert Orsborn; Wilfred Kitching
- Preceded by: Office established
- Succeeded by: Office abolished

Personal details
- Born: John James Allan; 1887 Hazleton, Pennsylvania
- Died: 1960 (aged 72–73) Clearwater, Florida
- Spouse: Maude Parsons (m. 1909)
- Awards: Croix de Guerre; Order of Orange-Nassau

Military service
- Allegiance: United States of America
- Branch/service: United States Army
- Rank: Colonel
- Unit: 77th Sustainment Brigade
- Battles/wars: World War I, World War II

John James Allan (1887–1949) was an American minister and Salvation Army officer who served as the 8th Chief of the Staff of The Salvation Army, and a colonel in the United States Army, serving as a chaplain in both World War I and World War II.

== Personal life ==
John Allan, born in Hazleton, Pennsylvania, was the son of Salvation Army officers from Scotland. He was born in 1887 one year after his parents moved to the United States. Prior to becoming a Salvation Army officer, he worked as an employee for the Army's territorial headquarters for the United States' eastern territory. He played cornet in the New York Staff Band for twenty years and published various music pieces. He married Maude E. Parsons in 1909, a Salvation Army officer. Allan was also a founder of United Service Organizations. Allan died in Clearwater, Florida in 1960.

== Career ==
Allan was commissioned as a Salvation Army officer in 1906 and was appointed as the assistant corps officer at the corps in Mount Vernon, New York. However, in 1918, he joined the United States Army as a chaplain with the US 77th Division in Europe during World War I. During the war, while under fire, he carried dead soldiers back to camp so that their remains were not abandoned. As a result, he received two awards: the Croix de Guerre and the Order of Orange-Nassau. After the war, Allan returned to Salvation Army work in New York until 1923, then divisional commander from 1923 to 1933.

From 1940 to 1942, during World War II, Allan was second to William Arnold, the Chief of Chaplains of the United States Army in Washington, DC. In 1942, Allan was promoted to commissioner and was appointed as the territorial commander territorial commander of the Salvation Army's USA Central Territory. In 1946, General Albert Orsborn appointed Allan Chief of the Staff of The Salvation Army at the Army's international headquarters in London. As chief of the staff, he visited various countries around the globe where the Salvation Army operated. In 1954, he met Kwame Nkrumah, prime minister of the Gold Coast. He held the position until 1953 when his health declined. From 1953 to until his retirement 1957, he held the title of Special Delegate, a job specially suited for Allan's weakened state.
