= Frederick Coutts =

Eighth General of the Salvation Army

General Frederick Coutts CBE

8th General of The Salvation Army
- In office 23 November 1963 – 21 September 1969
- Preceded by: Wilfred Kitching
- Succeeded by: Erik Wickberg

Personal details
- Born: September 21, 1899 Kirkcaldy, Scotland
- Died: 6 February 1986 (aged 86) London, England

Frederick Coutts, CBE (21 September 1899 – 6 February 1986) was the eighth General of The Salvation Army (1963–1969).

== Biography ==
The son of corps officers, he was born in Kirkcaldy, Scotland in 1899. In 1920, he became an Officer of The Salvation Army from the corps in Batley, England. He served in divisional work in the British Territory from 1921 to 1925, when he became a Corps Officer of the British Territory. He would serve as Corps Officer of the British Territory for 10 years. It was during his time as Corps Officer of the British Territory that he married his first wife, Lieutenant Bessie Lee in 1925.

Beginning in 1935, he would work 18 years in the Literary Department of International Headquarters. During his time there, he was the writer of the International Company Orders from 1935 to 1946, Editor of The Officers' Review from 1947 to 1953, Assistant to Literary Secretary from 1947 to 1952, then in 1952, he became the Literary Secretary himself for a year. In 1953, Frederick would move from Literary Secretary to Training Principal at the International Training College. He would hold this job for four years. In 1957, he would become the Australia Eastern Territorial Commander for six years.

== Personal life ==
His first wife, Bessie Lee died in 1967. A graduate of Manchester University, she was also a Salvation Army officer. General Coutts married his second wife, Commissioner Olive Gatrall, in 1970.

General Coutts retired a day before his 70th birthday, 20 September 1969. He was succeeded by a Swiss officer, General Erik Wickberg, who held the post for almost five years.

General Coutts died at the age of 86 and is buried in New Camberwell Cemetery.

== Honours ==
- In December 1963, Frederick Coutts was elected by the High Council of The Salvation Army as General of the Army.
- During his time in office, received an Honorary Doctorate of Letters from Chung-Ang University in Seoul, South Korea in 1966.
- Order of Cultural Merit, Korea (1967)
- Order of the British Empire (1967)
- In 1981, he received an Honorary Doctorate of Divinity from the University of Aberdeen.

== Books ==
He is the author of the following texts:

- The Timeless Prophets (1944)
- Portrait of a Salvationist (1955)
- The Call to Holiness (1957)
- Essentials of Christian Experience (1969)
- The Better Fight (1973)
- No Discharge in this War (1975)
- No Continuing City (1976)
- Christ is the Answer (1977)
- Bread for my Neighbour (1978)
- In Good Company (1980)
- The Splendour of Holiness (1983)
- The Weapons of Goodwill (1986)

Extracts from his writings are also published in Through the Year with Frederick Coutts (1987) a book of daily readings by Peter Cooke.

Preceded by Wilfred Kitching	General of The Salvation Army; 1963–1969	Succeeded by Erik Wickberg
