= Barry Swanson =

Commissioner Barry Swanson

23rd Chief of the Staff
- In office May 2010 – February 2013
- General: Shaw Clifton; Linda Bond
- Preceded by: Robin Dunster
- Succeeded by: Andre Cox

Personal details
- Born: April 22, 1950 (age 75) Chicago, Illinois
- Spouse: Sue Miller

Commissioner Barry C. Swanson (born April 22, 1950) is an American Salvation Army Officer who was commissioned as an Officer in The Salvation Army on June 11, 1978 and who was the 23rd Chief of the Staff of The Salvation Army under Salvation Army Generals Shaw Clifton and Linda Bond. He was succeeded by Andre Cox in February 2013. Swanson was also a candidate for the 20th General of The Salvation Army in August 2013, but he was not elected.

== Work in The Salvation Army ==
Swanson was born in Chicago, Illinois, attended Northern Illinois University, where he earned a bachelor's degree in marketing. In 1975, he married Sue Miller. Together they entered the Salvation Army College for Officer Training in 1976. They held corps (church) appointments in Michigan & Minnesota. He served as the Divisional Commander of the Heartland Division headquartered in Peoria, Illinois. After this appointment, he was appointed the Territorial Program Secretary in 1999. His next appointment was as the Chief Secretary for the US Central Territory in 2003, and he was given the rank of Colonel.

Following this appointment, he was appointed National Chief Secretary at the National Headquarters. In 2007, Commissioner Swanson came to International Headquarters as International Secretary and Zonal Secretary for the Americas and Caribbean zone, before being appointed Territorial Commander of the USA Central Territory. He took the office of Chief of Staff on May 1, 2010, following the retirement of Commissioner Robin Dunster.

In February 2011, at the meeting of the High Council of the Salvation Army, Swanson was nominated to be the 19th General of The Salvation Army. He lost that election to Linda Bond, however. Swanson is now the territorial commander of the Salvation Army's Eastern Territory in the United States.

On 31 July 2013, Swanson was nominated as a candidate for the 20th general of the Salvation Army, but he lost the election to General Andre Cox.

=== Appointments ===
==== USA Central Territory ====
Corps (June 1977), DHQ (June 1990), Corps (July 1992), DHQ (June 1994) Divisional Commander (August 1995) Territorial Secretary for Programme (July 1999) Chief Secretary (April 2003)

==== USA National Headquarters ====
National Chief Secretary (July 2006)

==== International Headquarters ====
International Secretary for Americas & Caribbean (July 2007)

==== USA Central Territory ====
Territorial Commander (October 2008)

==== International Headquarters ====
Chief of the Staff (May 2010)

==== USA Eastern Territory ====
Territorial Commander (February 2013)
