= US National Commander of The Salvation Army =

Leader of The Salvation Army in the USA

The National Commander oversees the social works and Christian practices of The Salvation Army in the USA. The current commander is Commissioner Merle Heatwole, beginning his tenure on March 1, 2025. The US is divided into four territories: Eastern, Central, Western, and Southern. Each of these territories have their own leadership.

== National Commanders ==
No.	Name	Term of office
1	George Scott Railton	1880-1881
2	Thomas E. Moore	1881-1884
3	Frank Smith	1884-1887
4	Ballington Booth	1887-1896
5	Emma Booth-Tucker	1896-1904
6	Evangeline Booth	1904-1934
7	Edward Justus Parker	1934-1943
8	Ernest I Pugmire	1944 - June 24, 1953
9	Donald S McMillan	1953-1957
10	Norman S Marshall	1957-1963
11	Holland French	1963-1966
12	Samuel Hepburn	1966-1971
13	Edward Carey	1971 - January 28, 1972
14	Paul J Carlson	1972-1974
15	William E Chamberlain	1974-1977
16	Paul S Kaiser	1977-1979
17	Ernest W Holz	1979-1982
18	John D Needham	January 7, 1982 - April 13, 1983
19	Norman S Marshall	1983-1986
20	Andrew S Miller	1986-1989
21	James Osborne	1989-1993
22	Kenneth L Hodder	1993 - October 31, 1995
23	Robert Watson	1995-1999
24	John Busby	1999-2002
25	W Todd Bassett	2002-2006
26	Israel Gaither	2006-2010
27	William A. Roberts	2010-2013
28	David Jeffrey	2013-2017
29	David Hudson	2017-2020
30	Kenneth G Hodder	July 1, 2020 - March 1, 2025
31	Merle Heatwole	March 1, 2025 - Incumbent
