= John McMillan (Salvation Army officer) =

Scottish minister (1874–1939)

Commissioner John McMillan
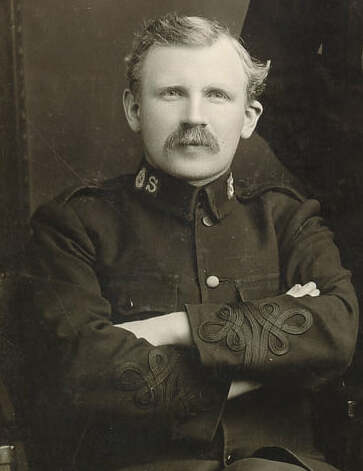
- McMillan with the rank of a major in 1909

5th Chief of the Staff
- In office 21 May 1937 – 22 September 1939
- General: Evangeline Booth
- Preceded by: Henry Mapp
- Succeeded by: Alfred G. Cunningham

Personal details
- Born: 1874 Glasgow, Scotland
- Died: 22 September 1939 (aged 64–65) London, England
- Spouse: Frances White (m. 1901)

John McMillan (1874 – 22 September 1939) was a Scottish minister and Salvation Army officer who served as the 5th Chief of the Staff of The Salvation Army from 1937 until his death in 1939.

== Personal life ==
Born in Glasgow, McMillan and his parents converted to Christianity in 1879. His parents were commissioned as Salvation Army officers and served appointments in northern England. In 1888, McMillans parents were appointed to a position in Canada. In 1901, he married Salvation Army captain Frances White. McMillan died on 22 September 1939.

== Career ==
He became a Salvation Army officer in his teenage years in Canada and was first appointed to a corps in the Ontario province. He later served as the private secretary to the territorial commander of the Canada and Bermuda territory in Toronto. He transferred to Australia in 1896 where he served until 1916. With the rank of Colonel, was appointed as chief secretary of Canada's eastern division, where he served from 4 August 1916 to 31 October 1923, shortly after many of Canada's leading officers had been lost in the Empress of Ireland disaster. He was then promoted to the rank of commissioner and became the territorial commander of the Salvation Army's central territory in the United States.

After serving as the territorial commander of the Canada and Bermuda territory, General Evangeline Booth appointed McMillan to be Chief of the Staff of The Salvation Army at the organisation's international headquarters in London, succeeding Henry Mapp. Shortly after taking office, McMillan became extremely ill and died in office. Some speculated that he may have succeeded Booth as general had he not become ill. Nearly one thousand people attended his funeral in New York City.
