= The Salvation Army U.S.A. Central Territory =

The Salvation Army USA Central Territory is one of the four territories The Salvation Army is divided into within the US. The Central Territory covers 11 states in the heart of the US, and is headquartered in Hoffman Estates, Illinois. The Central Territory is subdivided into 10 different divisions, all under different leaders, each reporting directly to the territorial commander. Each of the divisions has their own headquarters and also camp facilities.

The Central Territory runs 2,342 centers of operations, including Churches ("corps community centers"), Social Service centers, camps, and many other types of operations, and Adult Rehabilitation Centers. The college that all officers (pastors in The Salvation Army) must attend, known as the College for Officer Training, is a two-year college which is located in the Lake View neighborhood of Chicago, Illinois.

== See also ==
- Generals of The Salvation Army
- Chief of the Staff of The Salvation Army
- High Council of The Salvation Army
- Officer (The Salvation Army)
- Soldier (The Salvation Army)
- The Salvation Army U.S.A. Western Territory

== Sources ==
- Allen Satterlee, John G. Merritt, ed. (2017). Historical Dictionary of The Salvation Army. Rowman & Littlefield Publishers. pp. 587–592. ISBN 9781538102138.
- Chuck Munson (2013). The Salvation Army in Dallas: The Supply Chain Challenges of a Non-Profit Organization. Pearson Education. ISBN 9780133757149.
