= Charles Baugh =

Salvation Army officer

Commissioner Charles Baugh

7th Chief of the Staff
- In office 1943–1946
- General: George Carpenter
- Preceded by: Alfred G. Cunningham
- Succeeded by: John Allan

Personal details
- Born: Carlisle, England
- Died: 1953 West Wickham, England
- Spouse: Nellie Stewart (m. 1906)
- Children: 1

Charles Baugh was an English minister and Salvation Army officer who served as the 7th Chief of the Staff of The Salvation Army from 1943 until 1946.

== Personal life ==
In 1893, Charles Baugh saw General William Booth, the founder of the Salvation Army, speaking in Carlisle, England and shortly after joined the Salvation Army at the Wood Green Corps in London. Baugh was the son of Brigadier William Baugh, a Salvation Army officer and played in the International Staff Band.

== Career ==
In 1899, Baugh entered officer training for the Salvation Army and was appointed to the audit and accounts department at international headquarters 1900. Baugh spent most of his officership in finance-related and administrative work. In 1915, Baugh and his wife were appointed British India and later was promoted to the rank of colonel and served as the territorial commanders from 1927 to 1930. In 1930, Baugh was promoted to commissioner and returned to the Army's international headquarters in London to serve as the auditor-general until 1937 and the managing director from 1938 to 1943.

Baugh was appointed as the Chief of the Staff of The Salvation Army from 1943 to 1946 under General George Carpenter. In 1946, he was appointed territorial commander of the Canada and Bermuda territory. There, Baugh instituted a commission in 1949 that examined the matter of Salvation Army broadcasting to integrate the organisation more with emerging technology of the time. Baugh and his wife retired in 1951 from that appointment. Baugh returned to England where he died two years later in 1953.
