= Ron Cox (Salvation Army officer) =

Salvation Army officer

Commissioner Ron Cox

17th Chief of the Staff
- In office 1987–1991
- General: Eva Burrows
- Preceded by: Caughey Gauntlett
- Succeeded by: Bramwell Tillsley

Personal details
- Born: Ronald Albert Cox; 1925 Canterbury, England
- Died: 1995 (aged 69–70)
- Relations: Andre Cox (son)

Military service
- Branch/service: Royal Navy

Ron Cox (1925–1995) was an English minister and Salvation Army officer who served as the 17th Chief of the Staff of The Salvation Army from 1987 to 1991 under General Eva Burrows.

== Personal life ==
Ronald Cox was born in Canterbury, England. Before joining the Salvation Army, he served in the Royal Navy. He married Hilda Chevalley, a native of Switzerland. Cox's son, Andre Cox, later became the 24th Chief of the Staff of The Salvation Army and the 20th General of the Salvation Army.

== Career ==
Cox was commissioned as a Salvation Army officer in 1948. He served various corps officer appointments in the United Kingdom before being transferred to Rhodesia (now Zimbabwe). There, he served in various positions, including an assistant at the Howard Institute. Cox later transferred to Switzerland, then back to England at the International Headquarters of The Salvation Army where he served as the under secretary for the Army's operations in Africa. Later, Cox returned to Rhodesia with the rank of lieutenant colonel.

In 1977, Cox was promoted to colonel and transferred to the Netherlands where he served as chief secretary. In 1981, he was promoted to commissioner and became the territorial commander for the Salvation Army's Netherlands and France territory. In 1987, he returned to England after he was appointed by General Eva Burrows to become the 17th Chief of the Staff of The Salvation Army, a position which he held until his retirement in 1991.
