= Helen Clifton =

British Salvation Army officer (1948–2011)

Helen Clifton (née Ashman) (4 May 1948 – 14 June 2011) was a British Salvation Army Commissioner. She spent her childhood in London, connected to the Edmonton Corps of The Salvation Army. She was the daughter of Bandmaster Don and Mrs Betty Ashman. She attended the Latymer School in Edmonton under Dr. Trefor Jones from age 11. She was a teacher before becoming a full-time Officer of The Salvation Army. She trained at the International Training College at Denmark Hill, London, to become a full-time Officer of The Salvation Army.

She held a Bachelor of Arts (Honours) degree in English language and literature from Westfield College, University of London and a Post-Graduate Certificate of Education from Goldsmiths’ College, University of London.

She and her husband published Growing Together in 1984.

After her death, her husband edited a collection of her writings, entitled From Her Heart.

== Family ==
She married the 18th General of The Salvation Army, Shaw Clifton, in 1967. He died in May 2023.
