= Edgar Dibden =

Salvation Army officer

Commissioner Edgar Dibden

9th Chief of the Staff
- In office 1953–1957
- General: Albert Orsborn; Wilfred Kitching
- Preceded by: John Allan
- Succeeded by: William J. Dray

Personal details
- Born: 1888 Leeds, England
- Died: 1971 (aged 82–83)
- Spouse: Helena Bennett (m. 1914)
- Children: 1

Edgar Dibden (1888–1971) was an English minister and Salvation Army officer who served as the 9th Chief of the Staff of The Salvation Army.

== Personal life ==
Edgar Dibden was born in Leeds, England in 1888 and was the son of Salvation Army officers. In 1910, he entered training to become a Salvation Army officer from the Hanley Citadel Corps. In 1914, he married Helena Bennett with whom he had one child. He played cornet in the International staff band for over 15 years.

== Career ==
As a Salvation Army officer, Dibden served as a corps officer in several corps before he was appointed to various financial appointments at the Women's Social Services headquarters, where he served from 1914 to 1937. From 1937 to 1947, he served in a variety of financial leadership roles. In 1953, General Albert Osborne appointed Dibden to be the 9th Chief of the Staff of The Salvation Army, a position he held until his retirement in 1957. Dibden was officially installed on July 28 at Regent Hall.
