= Shaw Clifton =

General of The Salvation Army (1945–2023)

General Shaw Clifton
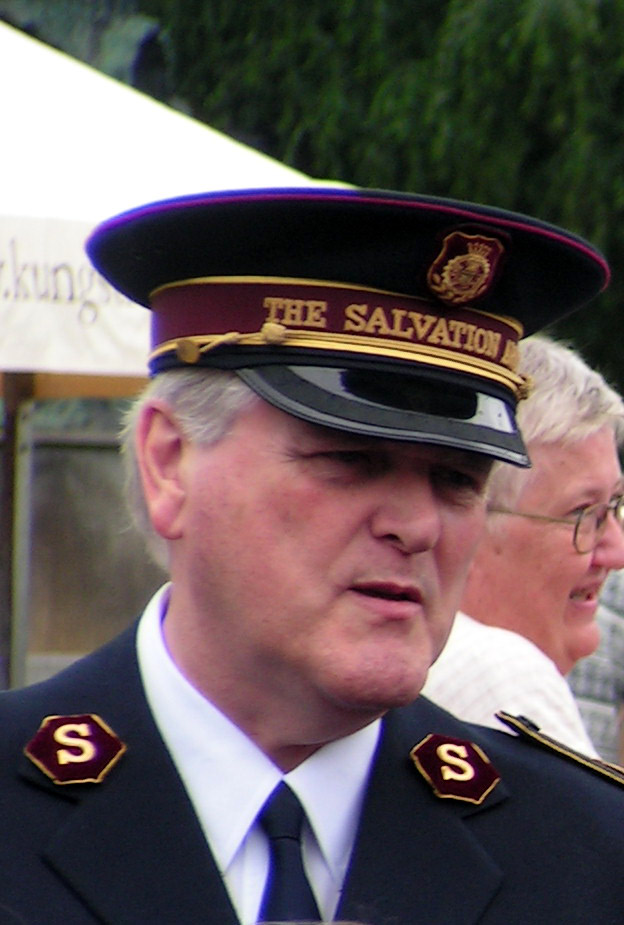

18th General of The Salvation Army
- In office 2 April 2006 – 2 April 2011
- Chief of the Staff: Robin Dunster; Barry Swanson
- Preceded by: John Larsson
- Succeeded by: Linda Bond

Personal details
- Born: 21 September 1945 Belfast, Northern Ireland
- Died: 29 May 2023 (aged 77)
- Spouses: Helen Ashman (m. 1967; died 2011) Birgitte Brekke (m. 2013)

Shaw Clifton (21 September 1945 – 29 May 2023) was a Salvation Army Officer who served as the 18th General of the Salvation Army. He succeeded John Larsson on 2 April 2006.

== Life and career ==
Shaw Clifton was born on 21 September 1945 in Belfast, Northern Ireland. His parents were both Salvation Army officers.

He married Helen Ashman in summer 1967.

Clifton was commissioned as an officer of The Salvation Army on 5 July 1973. His first appointment was to Burnt Oak Corps (London), in the British Territory in July 1973. He went briefly to continue his theological studies at International Headquarters (IHQ) in October 1973, before being appointed in January 1975 with his wife, Helen, to Zimbabwe (then Rhodesia), initially to the Mazowe Secondary School and then to Bulawayo as corps officers.

Clifton returned to the United Kingdom in 1979 to take charge of Enfield Corps, North London. In June 1982 he became the legal and parliamentary secretary at International Headquarters (IHQ). This was followed by an appointment in 1989 to Bromley Corps in South London. In May 1992 he became Divisional Commander in the Durham and Tees Division of the United Kingdom Territory with the Republic of Ireland. He served in that post until 1995. He was promoted to the rank of Lieutenant-Colonel and appointed Divisional Commander in the Massachusetts Division of the USA Eastern Territory for two years. He was appointed Territorial Commander of the Pakistan Territory of The Salvation Army in 1997 with the rank of Colonel, later promoted to the rank of Commissioner while still in Pakistan where the work of the Army prospered during his service there. In 2002, he became Territorial Commander of the New Zealand, Fiji and Tonga Territory.

In 2004, he was returned to the United Kingdom territory this time as Territorial Commander until, at the Army's 16th High Council held at Sunbury Court, Sunbury-on-Thames, London, he became General-elect of The Salvation Army on 28 January 2006, taking office in succession to General John Larsson on 2 April 2006. He served a five-year term, entering retirement in 2011.

Commissioner Helen Clifton was world president of women's ministries and was a Salvation Army officer from 1973. In 1984 they jointly edited a book, Growing Together, about marriage and family life.

On 13 September 2007, Clifton became a Freeman of the City of London.

Clifton and his wife retired in April 2011. Helen Clifton died in June 2011. In 2013 Clifton married Birgitte Brekke, an officer of The Salvation Army.

Clifton died on 29 May 2023, at the age of 77.

== Education ==
- LLB, King's College London
- Bachelor of Divinity, King's College, London
- AKC (Associate of King's College, London)
- PhD (History of Religion) at King's College London

== Views and politics ==
During his years in office, Clifton was interested in the connection between Christianity and social-ethical issues. He helped to shape current Salvationist positional statements on issues such as abortion, war, race and ethnicity, gender, marriage and family life, euthanasia, human sexuality and pornography. Clifton advocated a role for churches in social action, not just in social service.

As world leader of The Salvation Army Clifton worked for greater opposition to human trafficking. His convictions on the Army's calling to work for social justice gave rise to the establishing of the international social justice commission based in New York near the United Nations.

He encouraged freedom of contact between the Army and other branches of the Body of Christ, including the Roman Catholic Church.

Clifton sought to promote talented women Army leaders into more senior roles.

He emphasised the use of modern communication techniques in Christian ministry and encouraged a book publishing programme by The Salvation Army's International Headquarters in London and around the world.

He was known for writing and speaking on the practical possibility of living a pure and holy life in the secular world, by divine indwelling and grace. He drew upon the writings of the Reformers, John Wesley, William Booth, Catherine Booth, Samuel Logan Brengle, and Edward Read.

After his wife’s death, he edited a collection of her writings, entitled From Her Heart.

== Family ==
Clifton married Commissioner Helen Clifton (née Ashman), who was born in 1948 in Edmonton, London, on 15 July 1967. They had three children.

== Bibliography ==
- What does the Salvationist say ...? (about divorce, abortion, race relations, euthanasia, war) (Salvationist Publisher & Supplies 1977) ISBN 0-85412-287-7
- Growing Together by Shaw Clifton and Helen Clifton (International Headquarters of the Salvation Army, London; 1 Dec 1984) ISBN 0-85412-445-4
- Strong Doctrine, Strong Mercy (International Headquarters of the Salvation Army, London 1985) ISBN 0-85412-471-3
- Never the same again: Encouragement for new and not-so-new Christians (Crest Books 1997) ISBN 0-9657601-0-3
- New Love Thinking Aloud About Practical Holiness (Flag Publications 2004) ISBN 1-877359-04-1
- Who Are These Salvationists?: An Analysis for the 21st Century (Crest Books 2004) ISBN 0-9657601-6-2
- Selected Writings Vol 1 1974-1999 (Salvation Books, London) [2010] ISBN 978-0-85412-831-0
- Selected Writings Vol 2 2000-2010 (Salvation Books, London) [2010] ISBN 978-0-85412-832-7
- 'From Her Heart - Selections from the Preaching and Teaching of Helen Clifton' ed. Shaw Clifton (Crest Books, Alexandria, USA) [2012] ISBN 978-0-9831482-6-5
- 'Something Better - Autobiographical Essays' (Salvation Books, London) [2014]
- 'Crown of Glory, Crown of Thorns - The Salvation Army in Wartime' (Salvation Books, London) [2015]
- 'The History of The Salvation Army, Volume Nine, 1995-2015' (Salvation Books, London) [2018]

Preceded by John Larsson	General of The Salvation Army; 2006–2011	Succeeded by Linda Bond
