= John Larsson =

Swedish Salvationist (1938–2022)

General John Larsson

17th General of The Salvation Army
- In office 13 November 2002 – 2 April 2006
- Chief: Israel Gaither
- Preceded by: John Gowans
- Succeeded by: Shaw Clifton

20th Chief of the Staff
- In office 1999–2002
- General: John Gowans
- Preceded by: Earle Maxwell
- Succeeded by: Israel Gaither

Personal details
- Born: 2 April 1938 Sweden
- Died: 18 March 2022 (aged 83) London, England

John Alfred Larsson (2 April 1938 – 18 March 2022) was a Swedish Salvationist, writer and composer of Christian music and hymns, who was the 17th General of The Salvation Army.

== Biography ==
The son of officer Sture Larsson and Flora Ethel Mildred Benwell, he spent his early years in his native Sweden, in Denmark, Chile and Argentina. Even his grandparents were officers in The Salvation Army, and his grandfather on his father's side, Commissioner Karl Larsson, is known in the Army's history as the one who "opened fire" in Russia the first time (1914). John Larsson became an officer in 1957 from the Upper Norwood Corps, London, England. He graduated from the University of London with a BD degree.

After a year as a corps officer in the north of England, he served on the staff of the International Training College in London for seven years before returning to corps appointments.

Larsson and Captain Freda Turner were married in 1969. They had two sons, Karl Larsson and Kevin Larsson, who are both members of The Salvation Army.

Larsson and his wife were appointed to the South America West Territory in 1980, he as Chief Secretary and she as Territorial Home League Secretary. In 1984, they were appointed to the International Training College as principal and librarian, respectively. They were appointed to International Headquarters in London in 1988. Larsson, as assistant to the Chief of the Staff for United Kingdom administrative planning, was given the task of researching and planning for the separation of the international and national administrations. Freda Larsson served as coordinator for married women officers.

The Larssons were then appointed Territorial Commander and Territorial President of Women's Organisations for the United Kingdom Territory with the Republic of Ireland in 1990. In 1993, they were appointed territorial leaders for the New Zealand, Fiji and Tonga Territory; and in 1996, they received similar appointments for the Sweden and Latvia Territory.

Larsson was the author of Doctrine Without Tears, The Man Perfectly Filled with the Spirit, Spiritual Breakthrough and How Your Corps Can Grow. He is also the author of 1929, a history of the events that took place that year in The Salvation Army, Inside a High Council, explaining the workings of The Salvation Army High Council, and Those incredible Booths: William and Catherine Booth as parents.

Larsson was also a composer and, together with John Gowans, co-authored ten full-length stage musicals. They included Take-Over Bid (1967), Hosea (1969), Jesus Folk (1972), Spirit (1973), Glory (1975), White Rose (1977), The Blood Of The Lamb (1978), Son Of Man (1983), Man Mark II (1985), and The Meeting (1990).

In 1999, Larsson became chief of the staff, second-in-command of The Salvation Army worldwide. His wife became World Secretary for Women's Organisations (later Women's Ministries).

Larsson was elected General on 13 November 2002, and assumed the office following the retirement of his predecessor, General John Gowans.

Shaw Clifton succeeded to the office of General when Larsson retired at midnight on 1 April 2006.

Larsson died at his home in Bromley, London on 18 March 2022, at the age of 83.

Preceded by John Gowans	General of The Salvation Army; 2002–2006	Succeeded by Shaw Clifton
