= Lyndon Buckingham =

Salvation Army officer

General Lyndon Buckingham
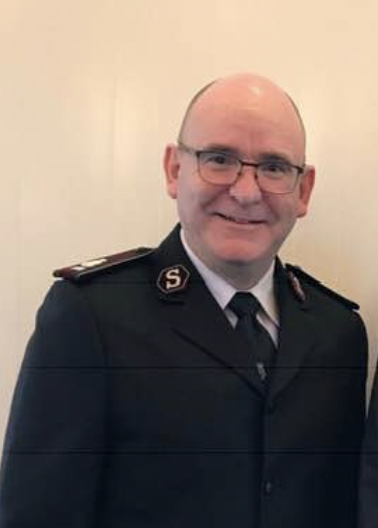
- Buckingham in 2018

22nd General of the Salvation Army
- Incumbent
- Assumed office 3 August 2023
- Chief: Edward Hill
- Preceded by: Brian Peddle

27th Chief of the Staff
- In office 3 August 2018 – 3 August 2023
- General: Brian Peddle
- Preceded by: Brian Peddle
- Succeeded by: Edward Hill

Personal details
- Born: Lyndon Vernon Wayne Buckingham; 13 February 1962 (age 64) Dannevirke, New Zealand
- Spouse: Bronwyn Buckingham
- Profession: Minister

Lyndon Vernon Wayne Buckingham (born 13 February 1962) is a New Zealand Christian minister who is currently serving as the General of The Salvation Army since 3 August 2023. He is the first person from New Zealand to hold the office.

== Family and early life ==
Buckingham was born in Dannevirke, New Zealand to Salvation Army officers Hillmon and Lorraine (née Smith) Buckingham, who were stationed at Woodville Corps (church) at the time. Hillmon and Lorraine Buckingham were later appointed to the rank of Commissioner and held Territorial Leadership posts. According to interviews, Buckingham had his first personal experience of the Holy Spirit and received his call to Officership aged 17 at a Salvation Army Youth Councils in August 1979.

Buckingham married Bronwyn Robertson in Whangārei, before they moved to Trentham, Upper Hutt to attend William Booth Memorial Training College (now Booth College of Mission), the Salvation Army's officer training college. They have two children, who are both officers in the Salvation Army, serving in the New Zealand, Fiji, Tonga and Samoa Territory. Lyndon and Bronwyn Buckingham have resided in London since they took up appointments at the Salvation Army's International Headquarters (IHQ) in 2018.

== Career ==
Lyndon Buckingham was commissioned as a Salvation Army officer along with his wife in 1990 in New Zealand. Along with his wife, Buckingham has been appointed to corps (local church centres), divisional (regional oversight), and other territorial headquarters postings in New Zealand and Canada, and held Territorial leadership roles in Singapore and the United Kingdom.

Buckingham was appointed Chief of the Staff of the Salvation Army in 2018, serving under General Brian Peddle. In 2023, Buckingham summoned the High Council of The Salvation Army to meet at Sunbury Court in London to elect a successor to General Peddle, who had announced his retirement, under the requirements of the Salvation Army Act 1980. After a week of formalities and deliberations, the members of the High Council elected Buckingham to the position of General-Elect.

=== Appointments ===
New Zealand, Fiji, Tonga and Samoa Territory

- Corps Officer (pastor), Queenstown Corps (1990)
- Field Training Officer, William Booth Memorial Training College, Upper Hutt, Wellington (1992)
- Corps Officer (pastor), Wellington City Corps (1998)
- Territorial Youth and Candidates Secretary (2004)
- Divisional Commander, Southern Division (2007)
- Territorial Secretary for Programme (2010)

Canada and Bermuda Territory

- Corps Officer (pastor), South Windsor Citadel Corps (1994)

Singapore, Malaysia and Myanmar Territory

- Chief Secretary (2013)
- Territorial Commander (June 2013)

United Kingdom and Ireland Territory

- Territorial Commander (2018)

International Headquarters

- Chief of the Staff of The Salvation Army (August 2018)
- General of The Salvation Army (2023)

Preceded by Brian Peddle	General of The Salvation Army; 2023–	Succeeded by Incumbent
