= André Cox =

General André Cox
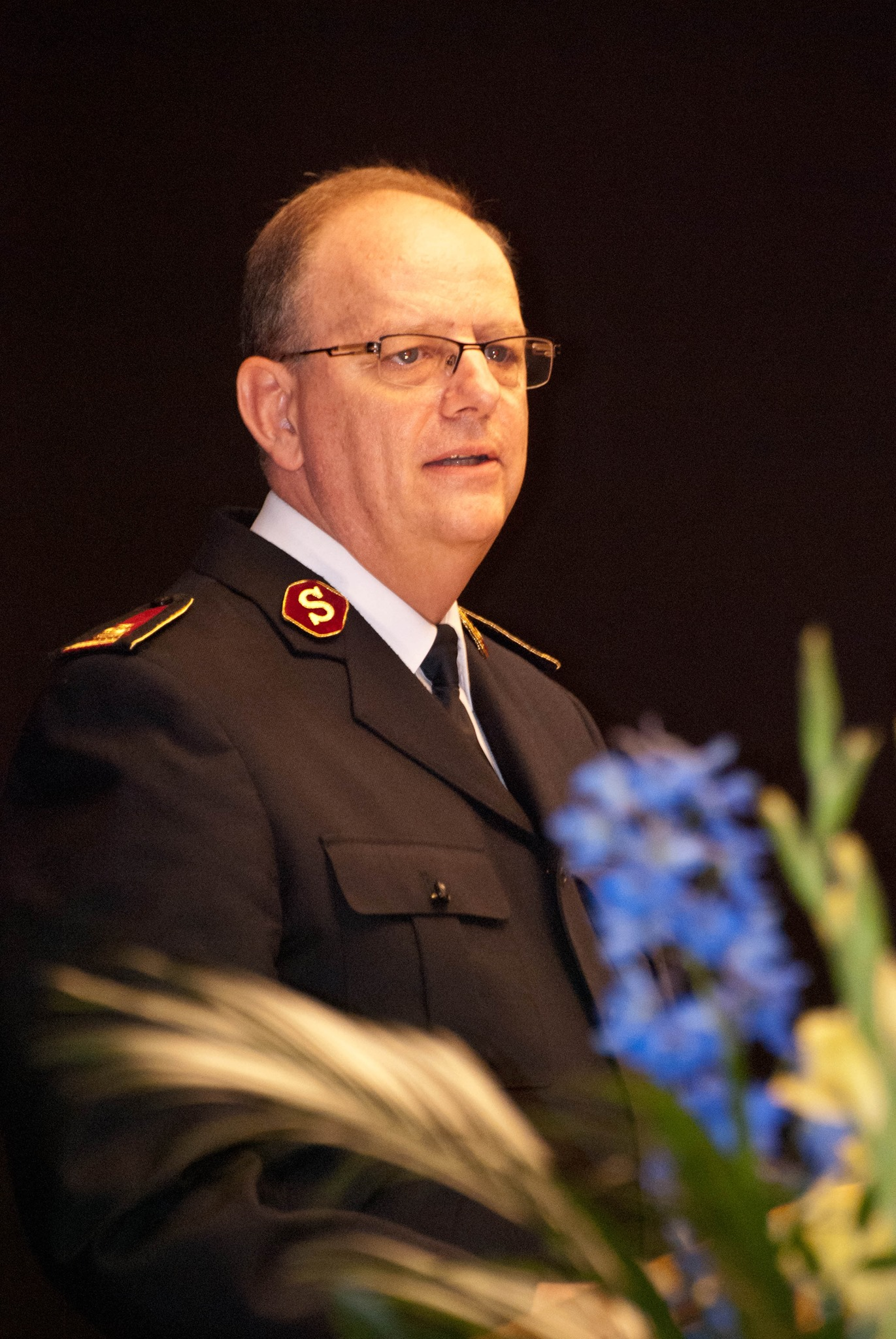

20th General of The Salvation Army
- In office 3 August 2013 – 3 August 2018
- Chief: William A. Roberts; Brian Peddle
- Preceded by: Linda Bond
- Succeeded by: Brian Peddle

Acting General of The Salvation Army
- In office 13 June 2013 – 3 August 2013
- Preceded by: Linda Bond
- Succeeded by: Himself

24th Chief of the Staff
- In office 1 February 2013 – 3 August 2013
- General: Linda Bond
- Preceded by: Barry Swanson
- Succeeded by: William A. Roberts

Personal details
- Born: 12 July 1954 (age 72) Salisbury, Southern Rhodesia
- Spouse: Silvia (née Volet)
- Children: 3
- Parent: Ron Cox (father)

General André Cox (born 12 July 1954) is the former chief executive officer (CEO) and 20th General of The Salvation Army. He was commissioned as an Officer in The Salvation Army on 25 May 1979. He was elected to the position of General by the 18th High Council of The Salvation Army on 3 August 2013 and retired on 3 August 2018; he was succeeded by Brian Peddle.

He was the Chief of the Staff of The Salvation Army from 1 February 2013 to 3 August 2013. In the wake of the unexpected retirement of General Linda Bond in June 2013, Cox fulfilled the duties of General as Acting General for about two months until his actual election.

Born in Salisbury, Southern Rhodesia, today Zimbabwe, to an English father and Swiss mother, Cox spent his childhood years in Southern Rhodesia and the United Kingdom, before moving to Switzerland where he met and married Silvia Cox (née Volet), who was born to Swiss parents in Argentina. He is the son of Commissioner Ron Cox, who was the Salvation Army's 17th Chief of Staff from 1987 to 1991.

== Officership ==
Cox was commissioned as a Salvation Army officer on 25 May 1979 and spent the early years of his ministry as a corps officer in Switzerland. In 2005, Cox was appointed as the territorial commander of The Salvation Army's work in Finland and Estonia; a post he held until he took command of the Southern Africa Territory in October 2008.

Cox and his wife Silvia spent four years as leaders of the Salvation Army’s Southern Africa Territory, which includes work in the countries of South Africa, Lesotho, Namibia, the Islands of St Helena and Swaziland. They then served for 6 months as the territorial leaders of the United Kingdom with Ireland Territory.

When he took up his appointment as Chief of the Staff of The Salvation Army, Cox followed in the footsteps of his father, Commissioner Ron Cox, who served as the Chief of the Staff from 1987 to 1991.

On 13 June 2013, when General Linda Bond unexpectedly retired from the position of General of the Salvation Army, Cox became Acting General of The Salvation Army. The High Council of The Salvation Army met on 29 July 2013 to begin the process of electing a new General. On 31 July 2013 Cox was nominated by the High Council as a candidate for the 20th General of The Salvation Army, and on 3 August 2013 was elected General of The Salvation Army.

Cox retired on 3 August 2018. He was succeeded by Brian Peddle.

== Appointments ==
Appointment	Territory	Start date
Corps	Switzerland and Austria Territory	June 1979
Public Relations	Zimbabwe Territory	July 1987
Territorial Headquarters	Zimbabwe Territory	June 1992
Finance Secretary	Zimbabwe Territory	April 1994
Head of Communications Department	Switzerland, Austria and Hungary Territory	October 1997
Business Administrator	Switzerland, Austria and Hungary Territory	February 2002
Territorial Commander	Finland and Estonia Territory	July 2005
Territorial Commander	Southern Africa Territory	October 2008
Territorial Commander	United Kingdom Territory with the Republic of Ireland	May 2012
Chief of the Staff	International Headquarters	February 2013
General	International Headquarters	3 August 2013

=== Retirement ===
In February 2018, Cox announced his retirement with effect on 3 August 2018. Cox, following the form of several of his predecessors, will have been General for exactly five years. The High Council of The Salvation Army chose Brian Peddle as Cox's successor in May 2018.

Preceded by Linda Bond	General of The Salvation Army; 2013 – 2018	Succeeded by Brian Peddle
