= Albert Orsborn =

General Albert Orsborn
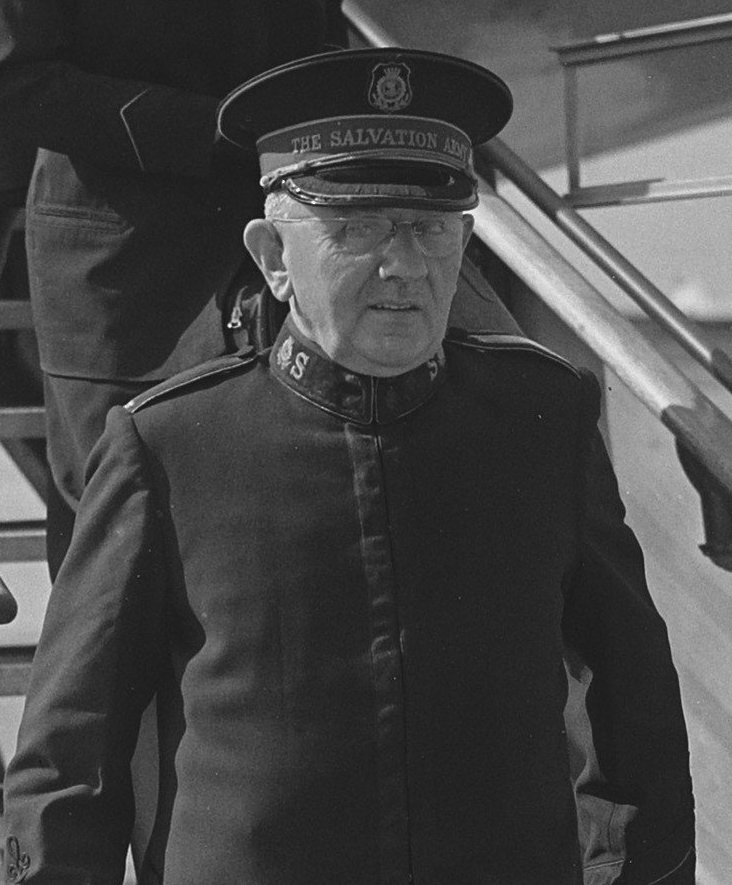

6th General of The Salvation Army
- In office 21 June 1946 – 1 July 1954
- Preceded by: George Carpenter
- Succeeded by: Wilfred Kitching

Personal details
- Born: 4 September 1886 England
- Died: 4 February 1967 (aged 80) Boscombe, Bournemouth, England

Albert William Thomas Orsborn (4 September 1886 – 4 February 1967) was the sixth General of The Salvation Army (1946–1954). He became an Officer of The Salvation Army in 1905. Albert served as a Corps Officer and in divisional work in the British Territory of the Army. In 1909, he married his first wife, Captain Evalina Barker.

In 1925, he was sent to serve as Chief Side Officer at the International Training College. In 1933, he was farewelled to New Zealand as Chief Secretary. He then became Territorial Commander of Scotland and Ireland in 1936. In 1940, he became British Commissioner.

Albert Orsborn's first wife, Captain Evalina Barker, died in 1942. Two years later, in 1944, he married his second wife, Major Evelyn Berry. They were married for just a year when she died.

Orsborn established the Brengle Memorial Institute retreat.

In 1946, the High Council of The Salvation Army elected Albert to become the General of The Salvation Army. He married his third wife, Commissioner Mrs Phillis Taylor (a daughter of General Higgins), in 1947.

General Orsborn served as General for eight years. He retired on 30 June 1954.

General Albert Orsborn died at the age of 80 years and 5 months.

== Publications ==
He was the author of The House of My Pilgrimage.

Orsborn also wrote several hymns including My life must be Christ’s broken bread, my love his outpoured wine and The Savior of Men Came to Seek and to Save.

| Preceded by George Carpenter | General of The Salvation Army; 1946–1954 | Succeeded by Wilfred Kitching |
