= Salvation Army Act 1980 =

United Kingdom legislation

- Act of Parliament
- Parliament of the United Kingdom
- Long title: An Act to revise and consolidate the constitution of The Salvation Army.
- Citation: 1980 c. xxx
- Territorial extent: United Kingdom; Salvation Army operations outside of the United Kingdom

Dates
- Royal assent: 1 August 1980

Status: Current legislation

Text of statute as originally enacted

The Salvation Army Act 1980 (c. xxx) is the legislation that governs the International Headquarters of The Salvation Army. The act limits and regulates the authority of the general of The Salvation Army, who serves as the organisation's chief executive officer (CEO). The legislation gained royal assent from Elizabeth II on 1 August 1980 and took immediate effect.

== History ==
The High Council of The Salvation Army was established by William Booth, the founder of the organisation, in 1904. It provided high-ranking officers the ability to replace a general who could no longer fulfill his duties for reasons of either ill health or general unfitness. Booth appointed his son, Bramwell Booth, to be his successor. When William Booth died, Bramwell Booth became general. By 1929, Bramwell Booth had become ill but refused to retire when asked by Salvation Army leaders. The first High Council was convened to remove Bramwell Booth from office; the measure passed 52 to 5. Booth was succeeded in the election of Edward Higgins, his Chief of the Staff. Largely because of Bramwell Booth's refusal to resign, the Salvation Army Act 1931, passed by the parliament of the United Kingdom, removed the general's ability to choose his successor. The Salvation Army Act 1980 places further restrictions on the organisation.

The Salvation Army Act 1980 revoked the Foundation Deed of 1878, the Supplementary Deed of 1904, and the Variation Deed of 1930. These revoked deeds originally granted the general significant power and established that the wealth and holdings of the organisation were directly controlled and managed by the leader.

== Legislation ==
The Salvation Army Act 1980 requires that:

- the Salvation Army's mission continue to be "the advancement of the Christian religion...the advancement of education, the relief of poverty and other charitable objects beneficial to society or the community of mankind as a whole."
- the Chief of the Staff of The Salvation Army serve as acting general when the office is vacant and that the chief of staff will summon the High Council to elect a new general when necessary.
- the High Council consists of territorial leaders of the Salvation Army (usually officers with the rank of commissioner)
- during the election of a general, in the first three ballots, a candidate must receive two-thirds of the vote of the High Council to be elected. From the fourth ballot onwards a candidate need only receive the votes of more than half the members present. The candidate who gets the fewest votes in each ballot must drop out until only two candidates remain.
- the High Council meet in the United Kingdom, though it is not specified where.
- a person elected general be an officer in the Salvation Army

The Salvation Army Act 1980 left in place several regulations established by previous Salvation Army Acts, such as that:

- the High Council elects the general
- no person over 68 can be elected general
- the general must retire if he reaches 68 years of age while in office
- The term of the general is five years and may be extended an additional two years.

The act of 1980 also gives the general the ability to promote a soldier to any rank in the Army

== See also ==
- Salvation Army Act 1931
- Salvation Army Act 1963
