= Bramwell Tillsley =

Canadian salvationist and writer (1931–2019)

General Bramwell Tillsley

14th General of The Salvation Army
- In office 9 July 1993 – 18 May 1994
- Preceded by: Eva Burrows
- Succeeded by: Paul Rader

18th Chief of the Staff
- In office 1991–1993
- Preceded by: Ron Cox
- Succeeded by: Earle Maxwell

Personal details
- Born: Bramwell Harold Tillsley; August 18, 1931 Kitchener, Ontario, Canada
- Died: November 2, 2019 (aged 88) Toronto, Ontario, Canada
- Spouse: Maude Pitcher

Bramwell Harold Tillsley (August 18, 1931 – November 2, 2019) was a Canadian salvationist and writer, who was the 14th General of The Salvation Army (1993–1994). General Tillsley died on Saturday, November 2, 2019, in Toronto, Ontario, Canada.

== Biography ==
The son of Salvationists, he was born in Kitchener, Ontario. His parents had emigrated in 1928 from the United Kingdom. As he grew up, he became a Junior Soldier and a Corps Cadet. He joined a Young People's (YP) Band and then a senior Band. When he won the honour student award at a music camp for his cornet playing, Maude Pitcher was the runner up. They married each other in 1953. Their first child, Barbara Tillsley, was born the following year. Bramwell and Maude Tillsley entered the training college as cadets in the 'Sword Bearers' session. In 1956, they became officers of The Salvation Army. Upon commissioning, they were appointed corps officers in Windsor, Nova Scotia, followed by Oakville, Ontario. They served for the next six years at the William Booth Memorial Training College in Toronto. Then they became the corps officers of North Toronto Corps. After that, the Tillsleys moved back to the training college so that Tillsley could take up the position of education officer. He went on to become a training officer, first in Newfoundland, then in the USA Eastern Territory.

The Tillsleys were soon promoted to lieutenant-colonel and they moved back to Newfoundland, with Colonel Tillsley appointed as the provincial commander. The position of divisional commander in the Metro-Toronto Division followed, bringing the Tillsleys to home ground. Tillsley became the principal of William Booth Memorial Training College in London, England in August 1981. He was appointed chief secretary of the USA Southern Territory in 1985. He was appointed as the territorial commander, Australia Southern in 1989. Commissioner Tillsley became chief of the staff at the international headquarters in London, England in 1991. He became General in 1993 on the fourth ballot with 29 votes in favour and 19 against. He held this role for only ten months and nine days before stepping down citing health reasons.

== Works ==
- Life In The Spirit
- This Mind In You
- Life More Abundant
- Manpower For The Master

Preceded by Eva Burrows	General of The Salvation Army; 1993–1994	Succeeded by Paul Rader
