= William A. Roberts =

American Salvation Army officer (born 1946)

Commissioner William A. Roberts

25th Chief of the Staff
- In office 1 October 2013 – 1 November 2015
- General: Andre Cox
- Preceded by: Andre Cox
- Succeeded by: Brian Peddle

Personal details
- Born: 26 February 1946 (age 80) Detroit, Michigan, United States
- Spouse: Nancy Roberts

Commissioner William A. Roberts (born 26 February 1946) is a retired American Salvation Army officer who served as the Chief of the Staff of The Salvation Army from October 2013 to November 2015 under General Andre Cox.

Commissioned as an officer in The Salvation Army in 1971 after completing training as a member of the Victorious session of cadets, he served in three corps appointments, followed by a number of divisional appointments, he as Financial Secretary, Divisional Secretary, General Secretary and as leader of two divisions: Western Michigan Northern Indiana and then Metropolitan.

The son of Salvation Army officers, Roberts holds a Bachelor of Science degree in Business Administration from Wayne State University and a Master of Arts degree in Religious Studies from the University of Detroit. He has also studied at the University of Minnesota, Nazarene Theological Seminary and North Park Seminary. He was selected to attend the International College for Officers in London in 1982.

He has served on the teaching staff of the Central’s Officer Continuing Education Program as well as the Central’s Asbury Theological Seminary Preaching Seminar.

Commissioners William and Nancy Roberts are the parents of four children — William, Rebecca, Barbara, and Bramwell — who, along with their spouses, have provided them with twelve grandchildren.

From 2001 to 2005 they led the South America East Territory, comprising Argentina, Uruguay and Paraguay. Commissioner William Roberts was next appointed to IHQ in London in 2005 as International Secretary for Business Administration, with Commissioner Nancy Roberts appointed as Secretary for IHQ Staff Development and IHQ Chaplain. On March 1, 2008, Commissioner William Roberts took up his appointment as Territorial Commander of the Kenya West Territory, on the very day of the creation of that territory, with Commissioner Nancy Roberts appointed as Territorial President of Women’s Ministries for Kenya West.
