= Israel Gaither =

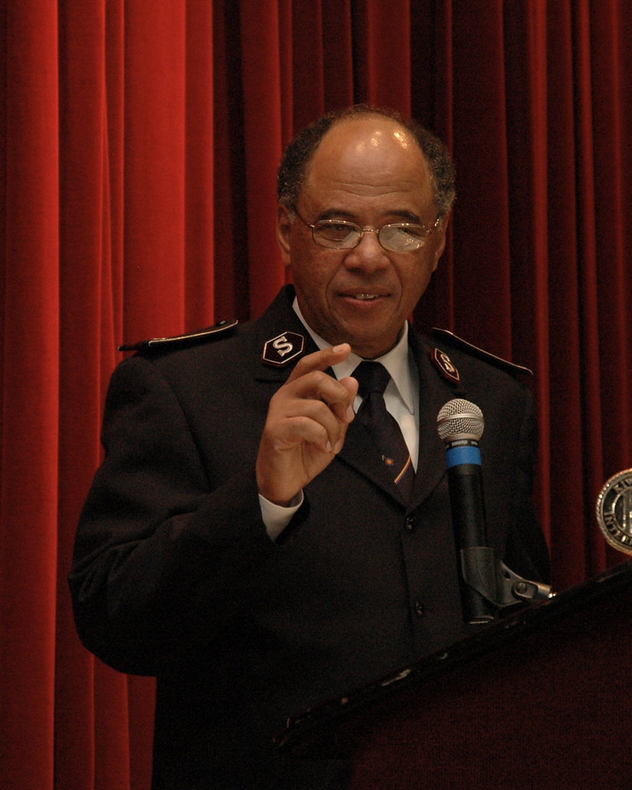
Commissioner Israel Gaither

On May 12, 2006, at the age of 61, Commissioner Israel L. Gaither was formally installed as the National Commander of The Salvation Army in the United States, the first African American to serve in that capacity. Gaither was selected for the position by General Shaw Clifton.

Eva D. Gaither, his wife, became President of the Salvation Army's Women's Ministries the same day, with executive responsibility for the advancement of women in developed and developing sectors of the world. She had been World Secretary for Women’s Ministries in London since November 2002.

Prior to becoming Commander in the United States, Gaither was Chief of the Staff, the second-ranking officer at Salvation Army world headquarters in London. He had held that office since November 2002. He had also been the first Black divisional commander in the United States, with responsibility for southern New England and western Pennsylvania, and the first Black territorial commander, responsible for the Eastern states. He had been commander of the Southern Africa territory as well.

== Biographical details ==
Gaither was raised a Baptist preacher's son in New Castle, Pennsylvania. He was the only son among five children born to the Rev. Israel L. Gaither, Sr. and Lillian Gaither. He took Salvation Army officer training in New York, and has led congregations in Pennsylvania and New York.

Eva D. Gaither was born Eva Shue in Sidney, Ohio, one of five children born to Richard and Merle Shue, and the fifth generation of her family to become a Salvationist.

Gaither and Shue married in 1967, breaking ground as the first interracial marriage between Salvation Army officers in the United States. Eva Gaither is white, and in 1967, interracial marriage was still illegal in many states. They have two children, Michele Gaither Sparks and Mark Gaither, and four grandchildren, Isaiah, Matthew, Virginia and Andrew.

Gaither is the subject of a biography by Henry Gariepy which was released in late 2006. Gaither was tributed on the floor of the United States House of Representatives by Georgia representative Sanford Bishop.

The Gaithers were officially retired from active service as Salvation Army Officers on October 31, 2010.

== See also ==
- The Salvation Army
- Chief of the Staff of The Salvation Army
