= Linda Bond =

General of The Salvation Army

General Linda Bond
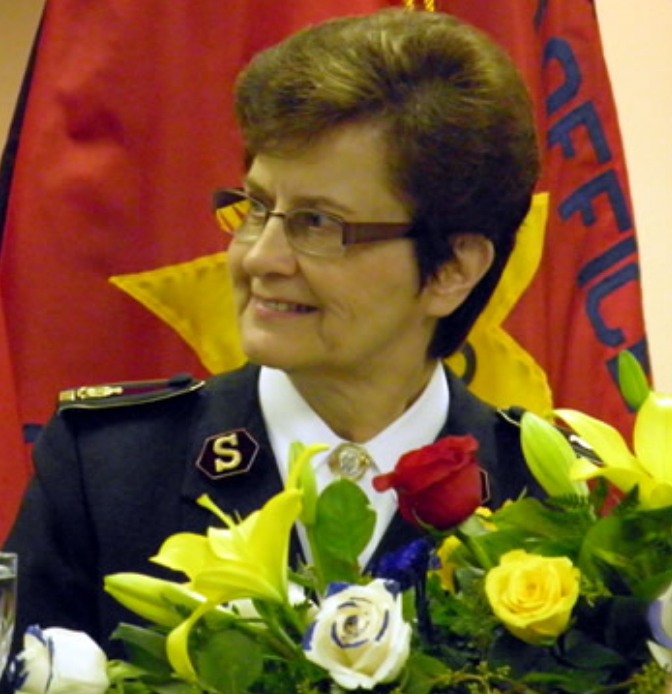

19th General of The Salvation Army
- In office 2 April 2011 – 13 June 2013
- Chief: Barry Swanson
- Preceded by: Shaw Clifton
- Succeeded by: Andre Cox

Personal details
- Born: 22 June 1946 (age 80) Glace Bay, Nova Scotia, Canada

Linda Bond (born 22 June 1946) served as the 19th General of the Salvation Army. She was born in Glace Bay, Nova Scotia, Canada.

After international service and various promotions, she held the post of territorial commander of the Australian Eastern Territory from 2008. On 31 January 2011, Bond was elected by the High Council to be the next General of the Salvation Army and assumed office on 2 April 2011. She was the third woman and fourth Canadian to be elected General of the Salvation Army. General Evangeline Booth (1934–1939) and General Eva Burrows (1986–1993) were the two previous female Generals of The Salvation Army. In late 2012, she received an honorary degree from Tyndale University College and Seminary. On 13 June 2013, she unexpectedly announced her retirement with immediate effect.

== Work in The Salvation Army ==
Bond was commanding officer of the Kitchener corps, before serving at the college for officer training in St John's, Newfoundland, as assistant training principal, divisional secretary of the Maritime division, and divisional commander of the same division.

In 1995 she was appointed to international headquarters in London as under secretary for personnel. She remained in the United Kingdom, transferring to the UK territory as divisional commander of the Central North division, in 1998. A return to Canada came just over a year later, when she was appointed as chief secretary of Canada and Bermuda territory.

In July 2002, she was appointed to the USA Western territory. In this role she served as territorial commander and territorial president of women's ministries.

In August 2004, Bond submitted her resignation from Army officership for personal reasons. General John Larsson accepted her resignation with regret and acknowledged her outstanding contributions during her officership.

In 2008 she became territorial commander of the Australia Eastern territory. She was elected to The Salvation Army's most senior office, General, in January 2011. She assumed the office on 2 April 2011. Bond held the Office of General until her unexpected and immediate retirement on 13 June 2013.

== Appointments ==
Appointment	Territory	Start Date
Corps	Canada and Bermuda Territory	June 1969
Training	Canada and Bermuda Territory	June 1978
Territorial Headquarters	Canada and Bermuda Territory	August 1982
Corps	Canada and Bermuda Territory	February 1987
Training	Canada and Bermuda Territory	October 1989
Divisional Headquarters	Canada and Bermuda Territory	July 1991
Divisional Commander	Canada and Bermuda Territory	July 1993
Under Secretary for Personnel	International Headquarters	July 1995
Divisional Commander	United Kingdom Territory with the Republic of Ireland	August 1998
Chief Secretary	Canada and Bermuda Territory	November 1999
Territorial Commander and Territorial President of Women's Ministries	USA Western Territory	July 2002
Unexpectedly resigns for personal reasons in 2004
Secretary for Spiritual Life Development and International External Relations	International Headquarters	July 2005
Territorial Commander and Territorial President of Women's Ministries	Australia Eastern Territory	July 2008
General	International Headquarters	April 2011 - June 2013
Unexpectedly resigns for personal reasons in June 2013

== Retirement ==
After holding the Office of the General of The Salvation Army for more than two years and two months, Bond announced her retirement on 13 June 2013. Bond was an active Salvation Army officer for 44 years.

The High Council of The Salvation Army convened on 29 July 2013 to elect a new General, with André Cox being elected as the 20th General of The Salvation Army. As of 2025, she is one of three surviving retired Generals.

Preceded by Shaw Clifton	General of The Salvation Army; 2011–2013	Succeeded by André Cox
