= Walter Stanley Cottrill =

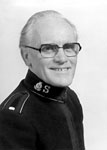
- Commissioner W. Stanley Cottrill Chief of the Staff
- Born: 14 October 1914; South Africa
- Died: 28 July 2005 (aged 90); Bournemouth
- Occupation: Chief of the Staff of The Salvation Army
- Years active: 45 (1937–1982)
- Title: Commissioner (Retired)
- Spouse: Alice Kathleen Ward

Commissioner Walter Stanley Cottrill (14 October 1914 – 28 July 2005) was the 15th Chief of the Staff of The Salvation Army.

Born in South Africa, Commissioner Cottrill spent most of his youth overseas, completing his schooling in New Zealand. It was from the Woodford Corps, Essex, that he entered the International Training College in 1937 and was commissioned the next year as Assistant Cadet Sergeant-Major, followed by British Territory corps appointments.

Within a few months of his marriage to Captain Kathleen Ward in 1940, they set sail for Muckden in Manchukuo but, because of political unrest, found themselves transferred to the Boys' home in Singapore in 1941. Early in 1942, invading forces reached Malaysia. With other officers of the command, Captain Cottrill was interned in the prisoner of war camp on Changi, Singapore, and Mrs Cottrill, with their small son, was evacuated to Australia. For the next three and a half years, they were to have no contact with each other. They came to regard even the experiences of these difficult years as a high privilege.

Following Captain Cottrill's release in September 1945, he returned to Malaysia with Mrs Cottrill to probation and prison work, the command of the Singapore Central Corps and Manager of the Boys' Home. In 1952 they transferred to Rhodesia as divisional officers, and in 1958 Major Cottrill became Principal of the Howard Institute.

After 20 years of overseas service, they returned to London where the Major was appointed Under Secretary for the Far Ease at International Headquarters. During this time he was also a member of the International Staff Band. The next few years of officership were then spent alternating between International Headquarters and overseas appointments, those being Chief Secretary in Japan, Secretary to the Chief of the Staff and Head of the Secretary' Department and Territorial Commander, in Korea.

It was from his appointment at International Headquarters as International Secretary for Africa and the Far East that Commissioner Stanley Cottrill was appointed Chief of the Staff, a position he was to hold from December 1977 until his retirement in April 1982.

It was in early February 1988 that the wonderful and loving partnership of Commissioner Stanley and Mrs Commissioner Kathleen Cottrill ended, with her promotion to Glory. After her promotion to Glory, the Cottrill Memorial Fund was set up, supporting the children of Salvation Army Officers in Korea.

Right up until his death, Commissioner Cottrill continued to be a familiar face at division, territorial and international Army events in London. He was a consistent and reliable soldier at Bromley Temple Corps, not only attending Sunday worship regularly, but being involved in many corps activities and special occasions. Commissioner and Mrs Cottrill always had a love for young people and communicated across generational boundaries with consummate ease. The Commissioner's ministry at Bromley in recent years included prayer partnership with young people in the corps. He took a special interest with those whom he was linked in this way.
