= Brian Peddle =

21st General of The Salvation Army

General Brian Peddle
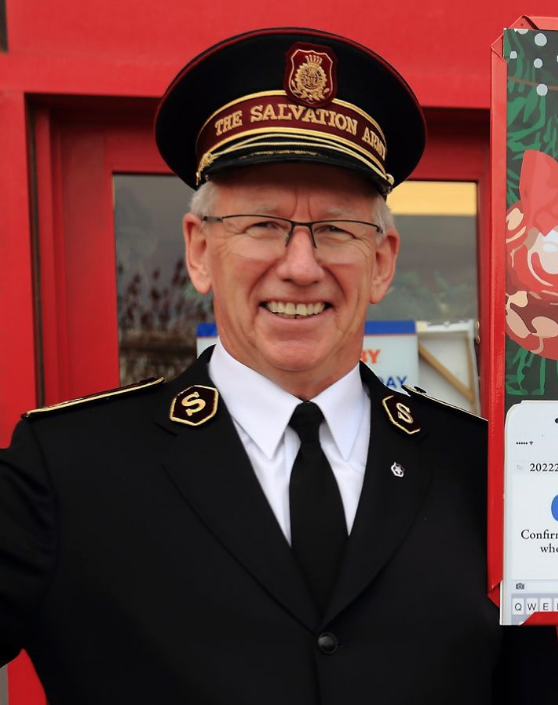

21st General of the Salvation Army
- In office 3 August 2018 – 3 August 2023
- Chief: Lyndon Buckingham
- Preceded by: Andre Cox
- Succeeded by: Lyndon Buckingham

26th Chief of the Staff
- In office 1 November 2015 – 3 August 2018
- General: Andre Cox
- Preceded by: William A. Roberts
- Succeeded by: Lyndon Buckingham

Personal details
- Born: 8 August 1957 (age 69) Trinity Bay, Newfoundland and Labrador, Canada
- Spouse: Rosalie Rowe

General Brian Peddle (born 8 August 1957) was the 21st General of The Salvation Army from 3 August 2018 to 3 August 2023. He was formerly the 26th Chief of the Staff of The Salvation Army from 1 November 2015 until 3 August 2018 under General André Cox.

== Career ==
General Peddle and his wife, Commissioner Rosalie Peddle, were commissioned in 1977 as Salvation Army officers. Since then, General Peddle has held several appointments, including service as a divisional leader in New Zealand and as Chief Secretary in the UK. He led their home territory (Canada and Bermuda) for three years until his appointment as Chief of the Staff. Peddle then served as the organization's international leader, general, and CEO.

=== Appointments ===
Canada & Bermuda Territory

- Corps (July 1977), Training College (December 1979),
- Divisional Headquarters (June 1985), Corps (July 1988),
- Divisional Headquarters (June 2000),
- Divisional Commander (June 2001)

New Zealand, Fiji and Tonga Territory

- Divisional Commander, Northern Division (February 2007)

United Kingdom Territory with the Republic of Ireland

- Chief Secretary (June 2009)

Canada and Bermuda Territory

- Territorial Commander (July 2011)

International Headquarters

- International Secretary for the Americas and Caribbean (September 2014)
- Chief of the Staff (November 2015)
- General of the Salvation Army (August 2018) Retired August 2023

== Election as General ==
On 24 May 2018, the 19th High Council announced that Commissioner Peddle would become the organisation's 21st General on 3 August 2018, succeeding Andre Cox. He is the fifth Canadian to hold the position, and the second from Newfoundland and Labrador. Peddle retired in 2023 and was succeeded by Lyndon Buckingham.

Preceded by André Cox	General of The Salvation Army; 2018–2023	Succeeded by Lyndon Buckingham
