= General of The Salvation Army =

Title of the international leader of The Salvation Army

- Rank insignia of General

- Standard of the Salvation Army

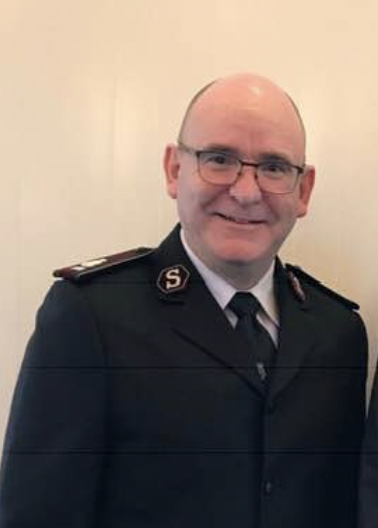
- Incumbent; Lyndon Buckingham since 3 August 2023
- The Salvation Army
- Style: General
- Type: Chief executive officer
- Residence: London, United Kingdom
- Appointer: High Council, but must be under 68 years old
- Term length: Five years, extendable up to a maximum of seven years
- Constituting instrument: The Salvation Army Act 1931 and Salvation Army Act 1980 via the Parliament of the United Kingdom
- Formation: 2 July 1865
- First holder: William Booth
- Deputy: Chief of the Staff

General is the title of the international leader and chief executive officer of The Salvation Army, a Christian denomination with extensive charitable social services that gives quasi-military rank to its ministers (who are therefore known as officers). The General is elected by the High Council of The Salvation Army and serves a term of five years, which may be extended to seven years. According to the organization, the General is purported to be chosen by God, and the council identifies that person. The position is roughly equivalent to the position of Archbishop in many other Christian denominations. Lyndon Buckingham is the current General, who assumed office on 3 August 2023 upon the retirement of Brian Peddle. The organization's founder, William Booth, was the first and longest-serving General. There have been 22 Generals as of 2023.

== History and procedures for election ==
Usage of the title "General" within the context of The Salvation Army, began with the founder of The Salvation Army, William Booth. His wife, Catherine Booth, the organisation's co-founder, became known as the "Mother" of The Salvation Army. General Booth served as General until his death in 1912; Booth selected his son, Bramwell Booth as his successor. It was William Booth's intention to have each General dictate their successor, but the Salvation Army Act 1931 passed by the Parliament of the United Kingdom requires that each General is selected by the High Council of The Salvation Army. Every General after Bramwell Booth has been selected by the High Council. In accordance with the Salvation Army Act 1931, a General must retire at age 68 and may serve as long as seven years. The General is elected by the High Council when their predecessor retires or dies (known within the Salvation Army as being promoted to Glory). William Booth was the only General to die in office. The High Council is composed of the Chief of the Staff, all active commissioners, except the spouse of the incumbent General, and all territorial commanders. The High Council may also remove a General from office for violations of their "covenant to God", disability, or the inability to fulfill their duties, though this has never happened.

The officer of the Salvation Army who is elected General is the worldwide spiritual leader of the Salvation Army and the chief executive officer of the organization. The General has a role that is similar to the Pope's role within the Catholic Church. Since The Salvation Army maintains a hierarchical, quasi-military structure, all appointments and regulations are issued under the General's authority.

Three women have been elected General of the Salvation Army: Evangeline Booth, William Booths's daughter, in 1934, Eva Burrows in 1986, and Linda Bond in 2011.

On January 31, 2011, after 10 days of meetings which began on January 21, 2011, the 17th High Council elected Linda Bond as the 19th General of The Salvation Army. Bond was the third woman to hold the post and the fourth Canadian. This election was handled by the largest High Council in history and was especially significant due to the number of women delegates (57) outnumbering the number of men delegates (52).

On 3 August 2013 the then-Commissioner André Cox was elected by the High Council of 2013 as the 20th General of The Salvation Army. The High Council of 2018 selected Brian Peddle as Cox's successor in May 2018; he took office in August 2018.

On 26 May 2023 the High Council of 2023 elected Lyndon Buckingham as Peddle's successor.

=== Vacancy ===
In the event of vacancy, either by death or resignation, the Salvation Army Act 1980 requires that the Chief of the Staff of The Salvation Army serve as acting General if a successor had not already been elected. The most recent instance of vacancy was in 2013 when Linda Bond retired unexpectedly; Andre Cox served as acting General.

=== List of living retired Generals ===
There are three retired Generals living. The most recent General to die was Paul Rader on 18 January 2025.

- Linda Bond
- André Cox
- Brian Peddle

== Leadership ==
The General serves as the chief executive officer (CEO) of The Salvation Army at the international level, but the organization is divided into many subunits controlled by other individuals. For instance, Commissioner Merle Heatwole, appointed by Buckingham, serves as the National Commander of The Salvation Army of the United States.

== Generals of The Salvation Army ==
No.	Portrait	Name (birth–death)	Term of office			Nationality	Chief of the Staff
No.	Portrait	Name (birth–death)	Took office	Left office	Time in office	Nationality	Chief of the Staff
1		William Booth OBE (1829–1912)	2 July 1865	20 August 1912 †	47 years, 49 days	(United Kingdom)	Bramwell Booth
2		Bramwell Booth CH (1856–1929)	21 August 1912	13 February 1929	16 years, 176 days	(United Kingdom)	T. Henry Howard
2		Bramwell Booth CH (1856–1929)	21 August 1912	13 February 1929	16 years, 176 days	(United Kingdom)	Edward Higgins
3		Edward Higgins (1864–1947)	14 February 1929	11 November 1934	5 years, 270 days	(United Kingdom)	Henry Mapp
4		Evangeline Booth OF (1865–1950)	11 November 1934	1 November 1939	4 years, 355 days	(United Kingdom) (United States)	Henry Mapp
4		Evangeline Booth OF (1865–1950)	11 November 1934	1 November 1939	4 years, 355 days	(United Kingdom) (United States)	John McMillan
4		Evangeline Booth OF (1865–1950)	11 November 1934	1 November 1939	4 years, 355 days	(United Kingdom) (United States)	Alfred G. Cunningham
5		George Carpenter (1872–1948)	1 November 1939	21 June 1946	6 years, 232 days	(Australia)	Alfred G. Cunningham
5		George Carpenter (1872–1948)	1 November 1939	21 June 1946	6 years, 232 days	(Australia)	Charles Baugh
6		Albert Orsborn (1886–1967)	21 June 1946	1 July 1954	8 years, 10 days	(United Kingdom)	John Allan
6		Albert Orsborn (1886–1967)	21 June 1946	1 July 1954	8 years, 10 days	(United Kingdom)	Edgar Dibden
7		Wilfred Kitching CBE (1893–1977)	1 July 1954	23 November 1963	9 years, 145 days	(United Kingdom)	Edgar Dibden
7		Wilfred Kitching CBE (1893–1977)	1 July 1954	23 November 1963	9 years, 145 days	(United Kingdom)	William J. Dray
7		Wilfred Kitching CBE (1893–1977)	1 July 1954	23 November 1963	9 years, 145 days	(United Kingdom)	Norman F. Duggins
7		Wilfred Kitching CBE (1893–1977)	1 July 1954	23 November 1963	9 years, 145 days	(United Kingdom)	Erik Wickberg
8		Frederick Coutts CBE (1899–1986)	23 November 1963	21 September 1969	5 years, 302 days	(United Kingdom)	Erik Wickberg
9		Erik Wickberg (1904–1996)	21 September 1969	6 July 1974	4 years, 288 days	(Sweden)	Arnold Brown
10		Clarence Wiseman OC (1907–1985)	6 July 1974	5 July 1977	2 years, 364 days	(Canada)	Arthur E. Carr
11		Arnold Brown OC (1913–2002)	5 July 1977	14 December 1981	4 years, 162 days	(Canada)	W. Stanley Cottrill
12		Jarl Wahlström (1918–1999)	14 December 1981	9 July 1986	4 years, 207 days	(Finland)	W. Stanley Cottrill
12		Jarl Wahlström (1918–1999)	14 December 1981	9 July 1986	4 years, 207 days	(Finland)	Caughey Gauntlett
13		Eva Burrows AC (1929–2015)	9 July 1986	9 July 1993	7 years, 0 days	(Australia)	Caughey Gauntlett
13		Eva Burrows AC (1929–2015)	9 July 1986	9 July 1993	7 years, 0 days	(Australia)	Ron Cox
13		Eva Burrows AC (1929–2015)	9 July 1986	9 July 1993	7 years, 0 days	(Australia)	Bramwell Tillsley
14		Bramwell Tillsley (1931–2019)	9 July 1993	18 May 1994	313 days	(Canada)	Earle Maxwell
15		Paul Rader (1934–2025)	23 July 1994	23 July 1999	5 years, 0 days	(United States)	Earle Maxwell
16		John Gowans (1934–2012)	23 July 1999	13 November 2002	3 years, 113 days	(United Kingdom)	John Larsson
17		John Larsson (1938–2022)	13 November 2002	2 April 2006	3 years, 140 days	(Sweden)	Israel Gaither
18		Shaw Clifton (1945–2023)	2 April 2006	2 April 2011	5 years, 0 days	(United Kingdom)	Robin Dunster
18		Shaw Clifton (1945–2023)	2 April 2006	2 April 2011	5 years, 0 days	(United Kingdom)	Barry Swanson
19		Linda Bond (born 1946)	2 April 2011	13 June 2013	2 years, 72 days	(Canada)	Barry Swanson
19		Linda Bond (born 1946)	2 April 2011	13 June 2013	2 years, 72 days	(Canada)	Andre Cox
20		André Cox (born 1954)	3 August 2013	3 August 2018	5 years, 0 days	(United Kingdom) (Switzerland)	William A. Roberts
20		André Cox (born 1954)	3 August 2013	3 August 2018	5 years, 0 days	(United Kingdom) (Switzerland)	Brian Peddle
21		Brian Peddle (born 1957)	3 August 2018	3 August 2023	5 years, 0 days	(Canada)	Lyndon Buckingham
22		Lyndon Buckingham (born 1962)	3 August 2023	Incumbent	3 years, 67 days	(New Zealand)	Edward Hill

== Timeline ==
Below is a timeline of Salvation Army Generals' terms in office.
