= Robin Dunster =

Robin Dunster (January 12, 1944- September 13, 2018) was the chief of staff of the Salvation Army International. The first woman to hold the office, she has been described by then-General John Larsson as a "gifted and widely experienced internationalist."

Robin Dunster was a pupil at Sydney Girls' High School and later trained as a nurse in Sydney (Australia). She was a registered general nurse and midwife (Canterbury District Hospital), with post-graduate qualifications in Mothercraft (St Anthony's, Ashfield) and psychiatry (Gladesville Hospital). She also held qualifications in Tropical medicine, Under 5s' Health and Planned Parenthood.

Robin Dunster was a graduate of the Salvation Army's International Training College (Victorious Session) in London, England. She was commissioned as an officer of the Salvation Army in 1971 and was appointed to medical work in the then-Rhodesia Zimbabwe. She served as Matron and Nurse Educator at The Salvation Army's Tshelanyemba and Howard Hospitals from 1971 to 1985.

Subsequent service in Australia preceded a return to Zimbabwe as Chief Secretary. In 1998 she was appointed Territorial Commander in the Democratic Republic of Congo, Angola, and, in 2002, The Philippines.

She was appointed to the post of The Chief of Staff on April 2, 2006.

On September 13, 2007 she became a Freeman of the City of London. She retired from that post in April 2010.
