= High Council of The Salvation Army =

The High Council of The Salvation Army elects a new general in the event of a vacancy or prior to the retirement of the existing office holder. It can also remove a general who can no longer fulfil their duties. The council is made up of the chief of the staff, active commissioners who are territorial commanders or who hold an international or national headquarters or territorial leadership appointment (except the spouse of the general), territorial commanders with the rank of colonel, and territorial leaders with the rank of colonel. It is not a governing body of the Salvation Army, and is regarded as having no continuity of existence between meetings.

== History ==
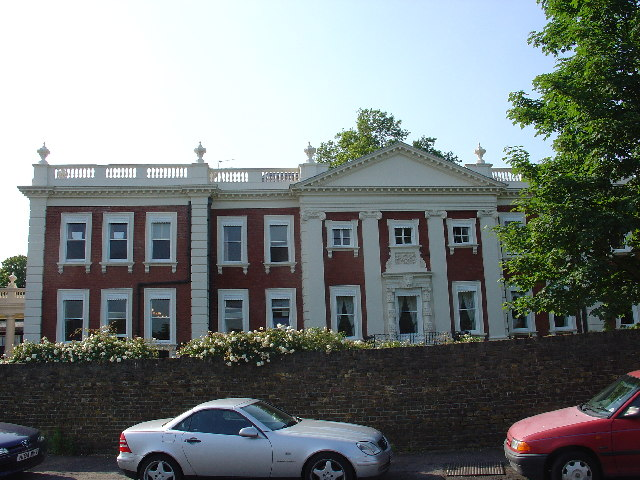
Sunbury Court is the historic meeting place of the High Council.

The High Council was established by William Booth in 1904. Its purpose was to remove and replace a General who could no longer fulfill the duties of office for reasons of either ill health or general 'unfitness'. The Chief of the Staff could summon the Commissioners to vote on the issue, and if they found that the General was not capable of performing the role they would choose a successor. It was intended that in normal circumstances the choice of a successor would be made by the outgoing General. This happened only with the second General of The Salvation Army, Bramwell Booth, who succeeded William Booth upon his death in 1912.

In November 1928, Bramwell Booth was away from International Headquarters for several months due to illness. He was asked to resign, but refused. On 8 January 1929, the High Council met for the first time and voted 55 to 8 to remove the 73-year-old ill General.

General Booth took his case to court, and this lost him a great deal of respect. The Proceedings were delayed by the death of Lieut-Commissioner William J. Haines, Vice-President of the High Council, who collapsed during a High Council meeting and died 45 minutes later.

After over two months of deliberations, the court ruled in favour of the High Council. The High Council met on 13 February 1929, and elected General Booth's Chief of the Staff Edward Higgins as the new General of The Salvation Army.

The Salvation Army Act 1931 was passed, with the support of General Higgins. The effects of this were that the General lost the power to choose a successor, fixed an age limit of 70 for the retirement of the General, and created a trustee company to hold the properties and other capital assets of The Salvation Army instead of the sole trusteeship of the General.

The most complete history of this time period of The Salvation Army has now been compiled in "1929, A Crisis That Shaped The Salvation Army's Future" by retired General John Larsson.

High Councils to elect a new general have been held in 1934, 1939, 1946, 1954, 1963, 1969, 1974, 1977, 1981, 1986, 1993, 1994, 1999, 2002, 2006, 2011, 2013, 2018, and 2023.

British law requires that the High Council meets in the United Kingdom, although it does not specify where.

== Eligibility ==
The High Council established by William Booth in 1904 provided that ‘the person so to be elected may be either one of the members of the High Council or some other person’ Since 1980 nominees must be Salvation Army officers. To date, no General has ever been elected without being a member of the High Council.

A woman has been elected as General on three occasions.

== Election of a general ==
=== Preliminaries ===
The High Council will first elect a president to preside over the council. After electing a president to guide its deliberations, the first task will be to establish the way it will work. The council will review the Orders of Procedure used by the previous High Councils, which distils in to some 70 numbered paragraphs the accrued experience of all past councils. After reviewing the document and making any amendments it feels necessary, the High Council will formally adopt the revised version as its own Orders of Procedure.

A High Council is an exercise of spiritual discernment, and time is therefore set aside for worship, reflection and prayer. The collective prayer of the members will be that at the end of the process they might be able to echo the words of the Council of Jerusalem: ‘It seemed good to the Holy Spirit and to us…’ (Acts 15:28).

Time is also allocated for discussions on the challenges and opportunities facing the Army in different regions. These discussions help identify the issues that future Army leadership may need to address and the qualities required for the role.

=== Nominees ===
The High Council then moves to the nomination stage. Every member has the privilege of nominating someone to be a candidate for general. The only criteria laid down are that the person nominated must be an Officer in The Salvation Army and be under 70 years old. The Salvation Army has about 17,000 officers, which means 17,000 persons are eligible to be nominated. But on past precedent the forthcoming High Council is likely to nominate persons from within its own membership. Only those who are nominated by three or more members are deemed to have been nominated. Those who accept nomination become candidates – and it is from this panel of candidates that the High Council will be called to elect the next General.

At this stage, the High Council adjourns for a full day to enable the candidates and their spouses to prepare written answers to the questions that the Council has prepared. Candidates also work on speeches to present.

=== Questions and speeches ===
When the Council begins its deliberations again, candidates and spouses of the candidates read out their answers to the questions. Through the process of questions and answers, the High Council seeks to get to know the candidates at greater depth and to learn more about their leadership style, their personalities and their views on subjects related to the Army and its ministry. Each candidate then gives a speech. No parameters regarding subject matter or length are laid down but speeches usually deal with the candidate’s vision for the Salvation Army if elected General.

=== Election ===
After the questions and speeches, the election itself begins. Each member in turn receives a voting paper from the President and in a secluded area places a tick/check against one of the names on the paper before putting it in a ballot box. The process is unhurried and can take up to an hour for each ballot. After the voting has been completed the tellers count the votes. The Salvation Army Act 1980 – by which the High Council is governed – stipulates

1. that in the first three ballots a candidate must get the vote of more than two-thirds of the members present to be elected
2. that from the fourth ballot onwards a candidate need only receive the votes of more than half the members present
3. that the candidate who gets the fewest votes in each ballot must drop out until only two candidates remain. The balloting continues until one of the candidates reaches the required number of votes.

== High Council of The Salvation Army, 2006 ==
General John Larsson was due to retire at midnight on 1 April 2006. The Chief of the Staff issued summonses on 1 December 2005 to all who qualified as members on that date. The 2006 High Council was the second largest ever, with a membership of 100.

The High Council members met at Sunbury Court from 17 January until 19 January for a pre-High Council Conference led by the General. The Public Welcome to the High Council took place on Friday 20 January at the Methodist Central Hall in London. This gathering also incorporated a Farewell Salute to General John Larsson and Commissioner Freda Larsson.

On 28 January 2006, Shaw Clifton was elected. He took office on 2 April 2006.

== High Council of The Salvation Army, 2011 ==
General Shaw Clifton was due to retire at midnight on 1 April 2011. The Chief of the Staff issued summonses on 1 December 2010 to all who qualified as members on that date. The 2011 High Council was the largest ever, with a membership of 109.

The High Council members met at Sunbury Court from January 18, until 20 January for a pre-High Council Conference led by the General. The Public Welcome to the High Council took place on Saturday 22 January at the Lancaster London Hotel in London. This gathering also incorporated a Farewell Salute to General Shaw Clifton and Commissioner Helen Clifton.

Monday, 31 January, it was announced Commissioner Linda Bond would be the next General of the Salvation Army. She assumed office on 2 April 2011.

== High Council of The Salvation Army, 2013 ==
Following the unexpected retirement of General Linda Bond the High Council met on 29 July 2013 for the purpose of electing the 20th General of The Salvation Army. The 2013 High Council (the 18th High Council of The Salvation Army) was as that time the largest in the history of The Salvation Army. There were 118 members – 64 women and 54 men – with an average age of 59 years. Fifty-four attended a High Council for the first time. Twenty-six had appointments in the Americas and Caribbean Zone and 24 in the Africa Zone. The South Pacific and East Asia Zone supplied 21 members, Europe 18 and South Asia 15. Fourteen International Headquarters commissioners completed the total of 118 members.

The 2013 High Council was held at the gathering's third host venue – the Renaissance Hotel, Heathrow, to the west of London. The 1934 and 1939 High Councils had been held at Clapton Congress Hall in east London, with all other High Councils since the first in 1929 taking place at Sunbury Court in west London, which was undergoing a major refurbishment at the time.

On 29 July 2013, the first official day of the High Council's meeting, the members elected:

- President of the 18th High Council - Commissioner William Roberts (National Commander of USA)
- Vice-President of the 18th High Council - Commissioner Birgitte Brekke (International Secretary for Europe)
- Chaplain of the 18th High Council - Commissioner James Condon (Territorial Commander, Australia Eastern)

On 31 July 2013, on the third day of the High Council's meeting, the members nominated the following people for general:

- Chief of the Staff of The Salvation Army, Commissioner André Cox
- Commissioner Kenneth Hodder,
- Commissioner James Knaggs,
- Commissioner Dick Krommenhoek
- Commissioner Barry Swanson

Commissioner Clive Adams was nominated; however, he declined the nomination.

On 3 August 2013 the High Council elected Commissioner Andre Cox as the 20th General of The Salvation Army, who took office with immediate effect.

== High Council of The Salvation Army, 2018 ==
The High Council of 2018 elected Commissioner Brian Peddle, the current Chief of the Staff of The Salvation Army, as the next general to replace retiring General Andre Cox on 2 August 2018. As with the 2013 High Council, it was held at the Renaissance Hotel, Heathrow, to the west of London.

== High Council of The Salvation Army, 2023 ==
The 2023 High Council commenced on 18 May 2023 at Sunbury Court Conference Centre in London, United Kingdom and ended on May 27. On 27 May, the Council announced that it had elected New Zealander Commissioner Lyndon Buckingham to succeed General Brian Peddle. The General took office on 3 August 2023.

== See also ==
- The Salvation Army
- Generals of The Salvation Army
- Chief of the Staff of The Salvation Army
- Officer of The Salvation Army
