= Chief of the Staff of The Salvation Army =

- Rank insignia of Chief of the Staff
- Incumbent; Garth Niemand since 1 October 2026
- Style: Chief of the Staff
- Reports to: General of the Salvation Army
- Residence: London, United Kingdom
- Appointer: General of the Salvation Army
- Term length: At the General's Pleasure
- Constituting instrument: The Salvation Army Act 1931 and Salvation Army Act 1980 via the Parliament of the United Kingdom
- Inaugural holder: Bramwell Booth
- Formation: 1881

The Chief of the Staff of The Salvation Army is a Commissioner appointed by the General of The Salvation Army as the second in command internationally. The Chief of the Staff is stationed at International Headquarters in London.

The office of Chief of the Staff was created in 1880 by General William Booth. The first officer to take the position was his son, Bramwell Booth, in 1881.

The Chief of the Staff also summons all Commissioners and Territorial Commanders of The Salvation Army to form a High Council to elect a new general when a vacancy exists.

== Lists of Chief of the Staff ==
1. (1881–1912) Bramwell Booth
2. (1912–1919) T. Henry Howard
3. (1919–1929) Edward Higgins
4. (1929–1937) Henry Mapp
5. (1937–1939) John McMillan (died in office)
6. (1939–1943) Alfred G. Cunningham
7. (1943–1946) Charles Baugh
8. (1946–1953) John J. Allan
9. (1953–1957) Edgar Dibden
10. (1957–1961) William J. Dray
11. (1961–1961) Norman F. Duggins
12. (1961–1969) Erik Wickberg
13. (1969–1974) Arnold Brown
14. (1974–1977) Arthur E. Carr
15. (1977–1982) W. Stanley Cottrill
16. (1982–1987) Caughey Gauntlett
17. (1987–1991) Ron A. Cox
18. (1991–1993) Bramwell Tillsley
19. (1993–1999) Earle Maxwell
20. (1999–2002) John Larsson
21. (2002–2006) Israel Gaither
22. (2006–2010) Robin Dunster
23. (2010–2013) Barry Swanson
24. (2013) Andre Cox
25. (2013–2015) William A. Roberts
26. (2015–2018) Brian Peddle
27. (2018–2023) Lyndon Buckingham
28. (2023–2026) Edward Hill
29. (2026-present) Garth Niemand
