= International Headquarters of The Salvation Army =

Building in London

Coordinates: 51.51164°N 0.09770°W

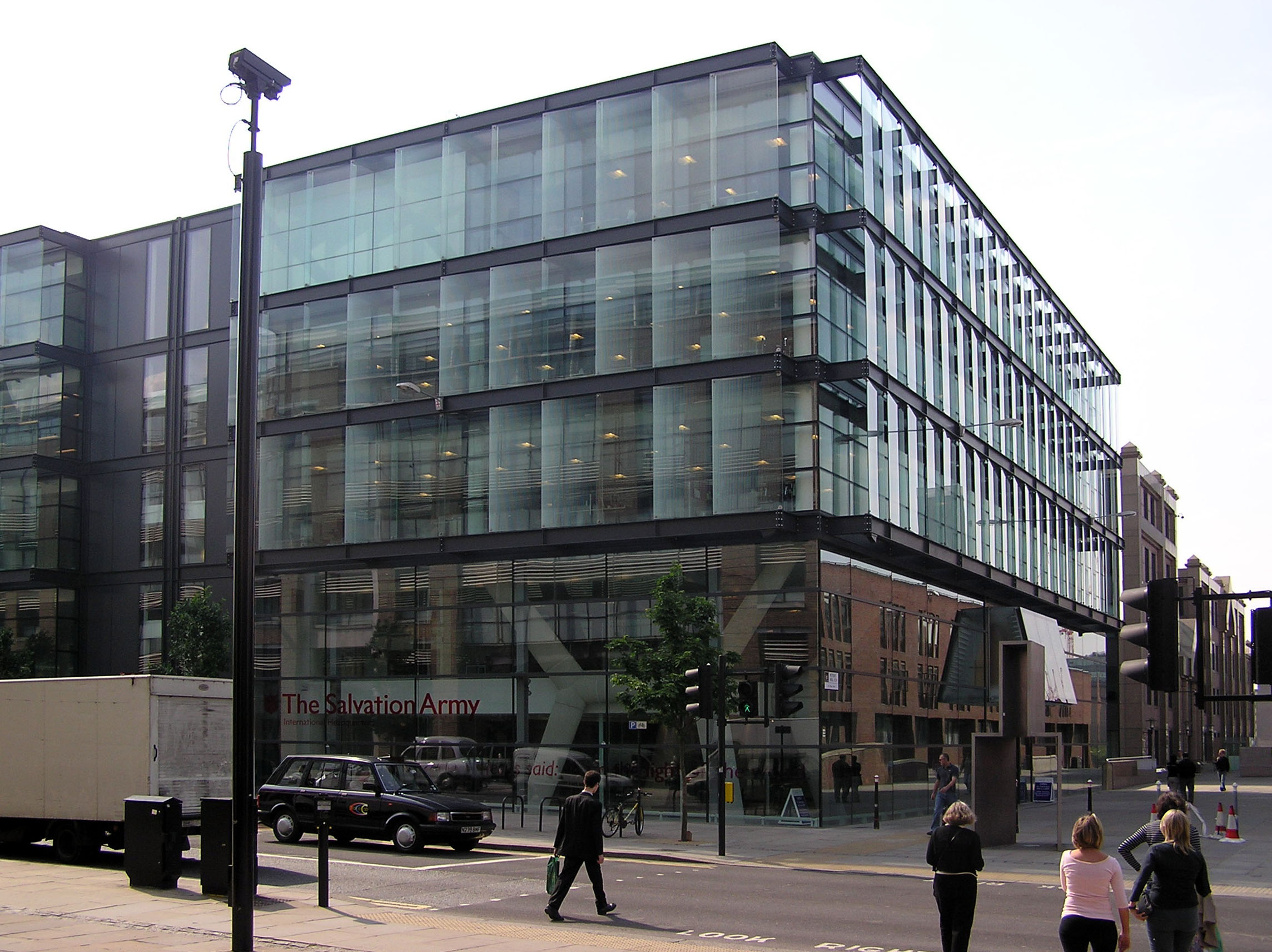
The International Headquarters of the Salvation Army

The International Headquarters of the Salvation Army (IHQ) is located in London at 101 Queen Victoria Street. It is six stories tall and has 34,861 square feet of office space.

The current IHQ building is the third to have been built on the site, which has been used by the Salvation Army for its headquarters since 1881. The present building was opened by Princess Anne in 2004, who described the office as a "working building" but also a "worship building." The previous building on the site was opened by Queen Elizabeth The Queen Mother. The building houses the offices of the General of the Salvation Army and the Chief of the Staff, in addition to a chapel and a public area, including a café. According to the Salvation Army website, IHQ "oversees, coordinates and supports the work" of the Salvation Army across the 133 countries in which it operates.
