= Officer (Salvation Army) =

Salvationist who is an ordained minister

An officer in The Salvation Army is a Salvationist who is an ordained minister of the Christian faith, but who fulfills many other roles not usually filled by clergy of other denominations. They do so having been trained, ordained and commissioned to serve and lead and given a title which uses the terms of typical military rank.

== Candidacy and training ==
When applying to become a Salvation Army officer, strict acceptance guidelines must be adhered to before training can commence. Each Salvation Army territory will have similar conditions that applicants must fulfill prior to entry and include the following, they must:

- Believe they are called by God to full-time ministry, specifically officership.
- Be active soldiers in their local Salvation Army corps.
- Receive a recommendation from the commanding officer of that corps.
- Be endorsed by the Salvation Army Divisional Candidates' Board.
- Receive satisfactory references from their families, friends, and peers.
- Attend an assessment conference weekend which includes a number of in-depth interviews with various assessors.
- Be accepted for training by the Territorial Candidates' Board, and territorial commander.

While attending a college for officer training, the training participants are referred to as "cadets". The length of training is normally twenty-two months, but a special dispensation may allow cadets to be commissioned after a shorter period, based on prior experience or training. Once this training is complete, the cadets are commissioned.

Officer training centres are located around the world.

Australia/New Zealand

- Eva Burrows College (Sydney, NSW)/(Melbourne, VIC)
- Booth College of Mission (Wellington, NZ)

Canada

- College for Officer Training (Toronto, Ontario)

United States of America

- College for Officer Training (Chicago, IL)
- College for Officer Training (Suffern, NY)
- Evangeline Booth College (Atlanta, GA)
- College For Officer Training At Crestmont (Rancho Palos Verdes, CA)

United Kingdom

- William Booth College (London, UK)

Philippines Officers Training College

== Commissioning and posting ==
Commissioning sees the cadets promoted to the rank of lieutenant and formalizes the cadets' first posting (commonly referred to as "marching orders"). These orders can send the new lieutenants anywhere in the territory, and sometimes even see them posted to other territories that could involve overseas service.

Officers have the opportunity to serve within the Salvation Army in many different capacities, and may be posted at a corps, divisional or territorial headquarters, the training college, supplies & purchasing, a recovery and rehabilitation centre, as a chaplain in courts (cancelled in Australia 2020), hospital chaplaincy (cancelled in Australia 2020), prison chaplaincy, Salvation Army 24hr help line (Cancelled in Australia), Missing Person Bureau (Cancelled in Australia), a street level outreach centre, a new corps (a church known as an "outpost" or "plant"), or any number of other need specific ministries or administrative functions.

Officers are regularly posted, officers are given "farewell orders" every two to five years and they are reassigned to different posts.

== The rank structure and uniform ==
Officers hold ranks throughout their service and into retirement, and their rank is reflected in their uniform. The uniform of an officer is much like that of a soldier and, like a soldier's, is defined by the region in which the person is serving. The consistent difference between the two uniforms is that the officer's uniform has red epaulettes, while a soldier's epaulettes are black or blue. Officers' epaulettes feature the Salvation "S" in silver, as well as another insignia to designate rank. These insignias may be sewn into the epaulette, or be separate metal pins attached to the epaulettes. Officers in all countries hold no legal or lawful commission as an Officer of any Government organisations; except that of being a public Minister of Religion.

All Ranks (Note: Many officers won't go through all ranks; most officers will only hold the ranks of Lieutenant, Captain, and Major.)
Epaulet	Rank	Date adopted	Current status	Description	Insignia / epaulettes
	General	1878	Active	The worldwide leader of The Salvation Army, elected by the most senior Salvation Army officers in the world	Crest with laurel leaves above gold bars on burgundy epaulet
	Chief of the Staff	1878	Active	The second-in-command to the general. Appointed by the general.	Crest with laurel leaves above silver bars on burgundy epaulet
	Commissioner	1880	Active	The leader of a territory, or international secretaries are also usually given the rank	Crest with laurel leaves above bar with another bar above the "S", upon burgundy epaulet
	Colonel	1880	Active	Reserved for territorial and international leaders	Crest above bar with another bar above the "S" upon a red epaulet
	Lieutenant-colonel		Active	Appointed to Salvation Army officers on merit by the General	Crest above bar upon red epaulets
	Brigadier	1880	Discontinued	Formerly used to signify 35 years of service. Discontinued in the 1970s, although still used by anyone who earned the rank before its termination.	Two stars and a Crest upon a red epaulet
	Major	1879	Active	After 15 years of exemplary service, the officer is eligible to be promoted to the rank of major	Crest upon red epaulet
	Captain	1877	Active	After five years of exemplary service, the officer is eligible to be promoted to the rank of captain	Two stars upon red epaulet
	Auxiliary Captain		Active	Serve as officers but are beyond the minimum age for training. Auxiliary Captains never hold the ranks of Lieutenant and Cadet, and they may be promoted to Captain after five years. This rank is used in certain territories only, most notably the Southern Territory of the USA and in Canada.	Blank red epaulet
	Lieutenant	1879	Discontinued (2001) reinstated (2008)	Following successful term at college for officer training, the cadet is commissioned with the rank of lieutenant	One star upon red epaulet
	Cadet-Lieutenant		Active	This rank is rare; it is given to a cadet who is sent into the field as an officer before graduating training.	Two red bars (upon blue epaulet / UK - on black epaulettes)
	2nd Year Cadet	1880	Active	A Salvation Army soldier who is undertaking training to become an officer at a Salvation Army college for officer training	Two (second year) red bars (upon blue epaulet / UK - upon black epaulet)
	1st Year Cadet	1880	Active	A Salvation Army soldier who is undertaking training to become an officer at a Salvation Army college for officer training	One red bar (upon blue epaulet / UK - upon black epaulet)
Varies	Envoy/Auxiliary-Lieutenant		Active	A non-commissioned officer who works for the Salvation Army in a ministry position	Varies by territory
	Sergeant		Active	A non-commissioned officer who works for the Salvation Army in a ministry position in the USA Southern territory	Three white chevrons upon a blue epaulet
	Candidate		Active	A person undergoing assessment for Salvation Army officership or envoyship	Candidate's pin worn on the left side of the tunic above the heart

Other notable non-officers ranks (in no particular order):

Epaulet	Rank	Description	Insignia / epaulettes
	Corps Sergeant Major	The lead local officer position, somewhat similar to a chief deacon or elder	Blue Epaulette
	Young People Sergeant Major	Young People’s Sergeant Major – responsible for the youth programs of the corps	Blue Epaulette
	Bandmaster	In charge of the corps band	Blue epaulette with two white bars
	Songster Leader	In charge of the corps songsters	Blue epaulette with two yellow bars (varies by territory)

Typical Rank Structure (Note: Cadet through Major ranks in The Salvation Army are earned by time served, not by any particular action. Most officers retire at the rank of major, while others are appointed to higher ranks. Officers retain the rank at which they retire until their promotion to glory (death).)
Rank	Time of service	Notes
Cadet	2 years	Training college rank - after two years, the cadet is promoted to lieutenant.
Lieutenant	5 years	Typically reserved for corps officers, low-level headquarters staff, or regional/area commanders
Captain	10 years	Typically reserved for corps officers, low-level headquarters staff, or regional/area commanders
Major	Until retirement or promotion	Typically reserved for corps officers, low-level headquarters staff, or regional/area commanders
Lieutenant Colonel	By appointment only	Typically reserved for divisional leaders and territorial headquarter staff
Colonel	By appointment only	Typically reserved for divisional leaders and territorial headquarter staff
Commissioner	By appointment only	Typically reserved for territorial commanders
General	By election only	Reserved for the head of the Salvation Army

=== Amendments to envoy and lieutenant rank ===
After a lengthy discussion with other Salvation Army leaders, General Shaw Clifton announced in November 2007 that the rank of lieutenant would be reinstated on March 1, 2008. All cadets are now commissioned as lieutenants for a period of five years. The rank of cadet-lieutenant was discontinued on the same date, but was reinstated in the USA Southern territory in June 2014.

All officers serving as lieutenants in the UK Territory now receive the rank of territorial envoy (as opposed to divisional envoy). Territorial envoys are soldiers who wish to work as non-commissioned officers for a limited time, usually three years. This replaced the rank of envoy and auxiliary-captain. Other territories have made other ranks to reflect this status such as feldsergeant in Germany; sergeant-major' in Ukraine; envoy in Russia and corpsenvoy in the Netherlands. The US Central, US Eastern, US and the US Western territories use envoy. In the US Southern territory they are sergeants. In the Canada and Bermuda territory they use envoy and auxiliary lieutenant.

== Corporate officers ==
In some jurisdictions officials may also have legal status as the officers of corporations associated with Salvation Army organizations. For example in the United States,

The national commander is the chairperson of the board of all Salvation Army corporations in the United States of America; the territorial commander is the president and chief executive officer and the territorial chief secretary is the vice president of all Salvation Army corporations in each territory. The board of trustees/directors of each corporation has the responsibility of management.

— Manual of Advisory Organizations and Articles of Organization (2015 revision)

== See also ==
- Generals of The Salvation Army
- Chief of the Staff of The Salvation Army
- High Council of The Salvation Army
- Soldier of The Salvation Army
