= Henry Mapp =

Salvation Army officer

Commissioner Henry Mapp
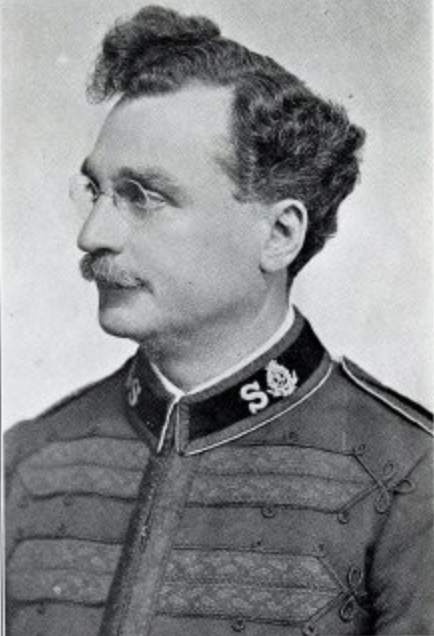

4th Chief of the Staff
- In office 5 March 1929 – 21 May 1937
- General: Edward Higgins; Evangeline Booth
- Preceded by: Edward Higgins
- Succeeded by: John McMillan

Personal details
- Born: Bombay British India
- Died: April 2, 1955 Bromley, Kent
- Spouse: Bessie Harriman (married 1890)

Henry Mapp was a British minister and Salvation Army officer who served as the 4th Chief of the Staff of The Salvation Army.

== Career ==
Mapp was commissioned by the Salvation Army in 1888 and served in British India and Ceylon before being transferred to London. He held administrative positions in Great Britain, Canada, South America, and Japan. General Bramwell Booth sent Mapp to Russia to establish a branch of the Salvation Army. However, communist revolutionaries forced the organisation to leave after the Bolshevik Revolution.

In 1929, while serving the organisation's international secretary, he participated in the first High Council of The Salvation Army, which successfully voted to remove the seriously ill General Bramwell Booth from office. Following Bramwell Booths removal from office, Mapp became Chief of the Staff of The Salvation Army under General Edward Higgins. Upon Higgins's retirement 1934, Mapp sought to succeed him as general. However, Evangeline Booth was elected to the position by the High Council. In 1937, Evangeline Booth removed Mapp as chief of staff after he became seriously ill and declared a leave of absence. She also accused him of various secret charges of immoral character which were never officially made public.

Mapp, however demanded, under Army rules, a hearing before a panel. The five-officer panel unanimously supported Booth's decision to remove Mapp as chief of staff and found him guilty of the secret charges. Rumors spread that Mapp was involved in an extramarital affair, to which he announced he would sue for defamation of character. Mapp claimed that he was dismissed as chief of staff because of his request to the general to retire on account of ill health.

== Later life ==
Little is known about the Mapps after they left Salvation Army officership, but it likely they lived in Bromley, Kent, where both of their deaths are recorded. At least one daughter became an officer, reaching the rank of Mrs Lieutenant-Commissioner, and retiring in Canada.

== Death ==
Henry Mapp was promoted to Glory in 1955 from Bromley, Kent. His wife Bessie re-deceased him in 1950, also in Bromley.
