= Clibborn =

Clibborn is a surname. Notable people with the surname include:

- Arthur Booth-Clibborn (1855–1939), Salvation Army officer in France and Switzerland
- Stanley Booth-Clibborn (1924–1996), British Anglican bishop
- John Clibborn (1941–2017), MI6 spy
- Judy Clibborn, American politician
