= Catherine Booth (disambiguation) =

Catherine Booth (1829–1890) was the co-founder of The Salvation Army with her husband William Booth.

Catherine Booth may also refer to:

- Katie Booth (1858–1955), English Salvationist and evangelist, daughter of the above
- Catherine Bramwell-Booth (1883–1987), English Salvation Army officer, granddaughter of Catherine Booth
- Catherine Booth Hospital, Indian hospital run by The Salvation Army, named after Catherine Booth
