= Order of the Founder =

Award given by The Salvation Army

In 1917, five years after the death of the founder of the Salvation Army William Booth, his son, General Bramwell Booth, inaugurated the Order of the Founder to recognise Salvationists who had rendered distinguished service, such as would have specially commended itself to the Founder.

The first awards were made in 1920 to 15 officers and one soldier. Three years later, seven officers and one local officer were honoured, but since then the awards have been made much more sparingly and, to date, 104 officers and 106 lay Salvationists have been recognised with the Army's highest honour, a mere 210 in total over 83 years.

The first presentation was to a soldier, Private Herbert Bourne, for outstanding Christian witness and service during military service in the First World War. A few senior leaders like Commissioner T. Henry Howard, General Evangeline Booth and Commissioner Catherine Bramwell-Booth have been picked out but, much more commonly, faithful and devoted service by less well known personalities has been acknowledged.

Some of the early awards went to people in the United Kingdom, Australia, Indonesia, Russia, France and the United States, but very quickly recipients from Japan, Guyana, Switzerland, Denmark, The Netherlands, China and Norway were picked out. New Zealand has probably had a higher than average recognition for the size of its population, but other territories such as Korea, South America West and Zimbabwe have also been featured.

The honour is rarely given and reviewed by a panel of senior leaders at IHQ to recognise meritorious Christian example, witness and service.

The recipients of the order are:

| Name | Rank | Region | Date |
|---|---|---|---|
| ADAMS Bernard | Colonel | British Territory | 1975 |
| ALEXANDER Alex | Major | British Territory | 1926 |
| ANDERSON Mary | Major | Australia Southern | 1944 |
| BECQUET Henri L | Lt-Commissioner | Belgium | 1955 |
| BEEK Anna M. J. A | Colonel | The Netherlands | 1990 |
| BENACK George | Captain | USA Eastern | 1920 |
| BENJAMIN Ruth (Mrs) | Major | Bermuda | 1982 |
| BLANCO Atanasio | Envoy | South America East | 1971 |
| BLOWERS Arthur R | Commissioner | British Territory | 1937 |
| BOIJE Helmy | Staff-Captain | Finland | 1920 |
| BOMAN Gustaf E | | Sweden | 1924 |
| BURROWS Eva | General (Rtd) | Australia | 2015 |
| BOOTH Evangeline C | Commander - in - Chief | USA | 1930 |
| BOOTH-HELLBERG Lucy (Mrs) | Commissioner | British Territory | 1933 |
| BOOTH-TUCKER Frederick | Commissioner | India | 1920 |
| BOSSHARDT Alida M | Major | The Netherlands | 1962 |
| BOURN Herbert J | | British Territory | 1920 |
| BOYD John (Sir) | | British Territory | 1981 |
| BRADWELL Cyril | Corps Sergeant Major (Rtd) | New Zealand and Fiji | 1993 |
| BRAMWELL- BOOTH Catherine | Commissioner | British Territory | 1983 |
| BRAUND Ralph C | YPSM | Canada | 1940 |
| BRENGLE Samuel L | Commissioner | USA Eastern | 1935 |
| BROKENSHIRE Nora | Brigadier | Canada | 1964 |
| BROUWER Jacob G | Lt-Colonel | The Netherlands | 1931 |
| BROWN Jean (Mrs) | Envoy | Canada and Bermuda | 1978 |
| BROWN Cecil | Major | USA Southern | 1947 |
| BROWN Jean | Major | Canada and Bermuda | 1988 |
| BUICK Steven | Envoy | New Zealand | 1925 |
| BURROWS Eva | General (Rtd) | Australia Southern | 2015 |
| BURTON Kenneth | CSM | USA Eastern | 2004 |
| BYWATERS Stella | Brigadier | Australia Southern | 1978 |
| CANNELL Thomas H | Corps Secretary | British Territory | 1932 |
| CARLETON John A. | Commissioner | British Territory | 1920 |
| CARREL Francoise | Adjutant | France | 1920 |
| CARROLL Mary Jane | Corps Sergeant Major | British Territory | 1955 |
| CASTILLO Ambrose | Sergeant | South America East | 1965 |
| CHANDLER W. George | Corps Sergeant Major | British Territory | 1949 |
| CHU Suet-King | Envoy | Hong Kong | 1976 |
| CLÉMENT Philippe | Sergeant | France & Belgium Territory | 2019 |
| CODOY Carolina (Mrs) | | The Philippines | 2000 |
| COLLETT Richard | Envoy | Australia | 2007 |
| COLLEY William | Envoy | New Zealand | 1943 |
| COLLIER Delilah (Mrs) | Home League Secretary | USA Eastern | 2002 |
| COOK A. Bramwell (Dr) | Lt-Commissioner | New Zealand and Fiji | 1983 |
| COX Sydney W | Bandmaster | British Territory | 1942 |
| COX Kathryn | Major | USA Southern | 2000 |
| COXHEAD Frederick J | Corps Sergeant Major | British Territory | 1931 |
| CROCKER James | Envoy | Australia Eastern | 1960 |
| CROCKER Tom | Senior-Captain | USA Central | 1952 |
| DALZIEL Geoffrey | | Australia | 2005 |
| DARTHUAMA Pu | | India Eastern | 2000 |
| DAVIDOVITCH Nina | | Eastern Europe | 2005 |
| DAVIES Bessie (Mrs) | | British Territory | 1927 |
| de NESFIELD Odessa Marshall | Corps Sergeant Major | Latin America North | 1991 |
| DeARMAN Billie Jean | Major | USA Southern | 1992 |
| DEGOUMOIS Lydia | Sergeant | France | 1967 |
| DEWE Herbert | Corps Sergeant Major | New Zealand | 1969 |
| DINSDALE George | Corps Sergeant Major | Canada | 1944 |
| DOCTER Robert (Dr) | Corps Sergeant Major | USA Western | 1992 |
| DUNLAP Eva | Sister | USA Eastern | 1946 |
| FAGERLIE Martin | Brigadier | Norway | 1953 |
| FITCH Polly | Sister | Canada | 1943 |
| FLINN William | Bandmaster | USA Western | 2015 |
| FOSTER George | Bandmaster | USA Eastern | 1951 |
| FRASER Jeannie (Mrs) | Corps Treasurer (Rtd) | Scotland | 1979 |
| FULLER George W | Colonel | British Territory | 1943 |
| FULLER Rebecca (Mrs) | Corps Secretary | South Africa | 1966 |
| FURSENKO Vladimir Mikhailovich | | Russia | 1993 |
| GALE Laura | Brigadier | British Territory | 1976 |
| GARIEPY Henry | Colonel | USA Eastern | 2007 |
| GAUGLER Lucie | Captain | France | 1920 |
| GEBBIE Eleanor | Brigadier | British Territory | 1973 |
| GEDDES Charles M | Brigadier | Australia Eastern | 1976 |
| GERMANY Pat | YPSM | USA South | 2003 |
| GOGIBUS Georgette | Major | France | 1958 |
| GOKSOYR Jorun | Major | Norway, Iceland & Færoes | 2001 |
| GOODING Edward | Corps Sergeant Major | USA Eastern | 1980 |
| GORDON Annie | Major | New Zealand | 1945 |
| GORE John | Adjutant | Australia Southern | 1924 |
| GORSKA Marija | Major | Sweden and Latvia | 1991 |
| GOVAARS Gerrit J | Colonel | Holland | 1947 |
| GREEN Jack | Bandmaster | Canada and Bermuda | 1978 |
| GREEN Thomas | Envoy | British Territory | 1923 |
| GREEN Stella | Major | Australia Eastern | 2018 |
| GUERRERO Raul | | USA Western | 2001 |
| HARTMAN Karin | Lt-Colonel | Sweden | 2001 |
| HAZELL George | Envoy | Australia Eastern | 1993 |
| HED Per | Brigadier | Sweden | 1920 |
| HERJE Anne Kristine | Major | Norway | 2004 |
| HIGGINS Ernest D | Lt-Colonel | USA Western | 1954 |
| HILE Kenneth | Corps Treasurer (Rtd) | Australia Eastern | 1980 |
| HIMES William F | Bandmaster | USA Central | 2000 |
| HINE Catherine | Adjutant | British Territory | 1920 |
| HODGE Thomas | Corps Sergeant Major | Australia Eastern | 1925 |
| HODGEN Jeanetta | Major | USA Western | 1944 |
| HOLLAND Arthur | Commissioner | British Territory | 1991 |
| HOLZ E. R. (Mrs) | Brigadier | USA Southern | 1987 |
| HOPPER Keith | Envoy | Australia Eastern | 1978 |
| HUDSON Bramwell | YPSM | Newfoundland East | 1970 |
| HOWARD T. Henry | Commissioner | British Territory | 1920 |
| IRWIN John | Brigadier | Australia Eastern | 1970 |
| IWASA Rin (Dr) | Adjutant | Japan | 1923 |
| JENSON Henry Kragh | Bandmaster | Denmark | 1962 |
| JEWKES Frederick E | Colonel | British Territory | 1961 |
| JOHANSSON Gustaf | | Sweden | 1924 |
| JOHNSON Warren | Corps Sergeant Major | USA Western Territory | 2012 |
| JONES Iris | Divisional Envoy | British Territory | 2015 |
| JONES Noel | Bandmaster | Australia Southern | 2014 |
| JONSSON Hulda | Brigadier | Sweden | 1977 |
| JOSEPH Hendrik Mangindaan | Envoy | Indonesia | 1970 |
| KHUMA Kawl | Lt-Colonel | India North Eastern | 1966 |
| KHUMALO Mzilikazi | | South Africa | 2001 |
| KIM Hyun-Sook | Envoy | Korea | 1990 |
| KIRBY Leonard | Colonel | Canada and Bermuda | 1982 |
| KIRBY Leonard | Major | Canada and Bermuda | 1972 |
| KIVINIEMI Julia | Corps Secretary | Finland | 1972 |
| KJØLNER Egil | Corps Sergeant Major | Norway | 1984 |
| KNIGHTLEY Brian | Lt-Colonel | UK | 2004 |
| KNIGHTLEY Dorothy | Lt-Colonel | UK | 2004 |
| KORBEL Josef | Brigadier | Czechoslovakia | 1990 |
| KRIDER George | Corps Treasurer | USA Eastern | 1985 |
| KRISTANO Ajub | Corps Sergeant Major | Indonesia | 1974 |
| KROEKER Levina | Lt-Colonel | Canada and Bermuda | 1990 |
| KUNZ Victor (Dr) | Corps Sergeant Major | Switzerland | 1953 |
| LALZUALA | Corps Sergeant Major | India Eastern | 1993 |
| LAMB David C | Commissioner | Scotland and Ireland | 1939 |
| LARSSON Karl | Commissioner | Sweden | 1949 |
| LAUDUN Ferraez (Mrs Ruby) | Soldier | USA Southern | 1983 |
| LAUTIER Marguerite | Major | France | 2000 |
| LEWIS Mother Ida | | USA Central | 1944 |
| LJUNGQVIST Erik | Corps Sergeant Major | Sweden | 1952 |
| LORD Olive | Envoy | New Zealand | 1969 |
| LUCAS Bramwell | Colonel | Australia Eastern | 2001 |
| McArthur Robert (Bob) and Shirley | | Canada and Bermuda | 2010 |
| McBRIDE Donald G | Corps Sergeant Major | Canada and Bermuda | 1988 |
| McBRIDE H. Joan (Mrs) | | Canada and Bermuda | 1988 |
| McCLINTOCK Walter | Envoy | USA Central | 1988 |
| MacFARLANE James | Corps Sergeant Major | Canada and Bermuda | 1975 |
| McILVEEN Arthur W | Brigadier | Australia Eastern | 1967 |
| McKENZIE William | Lt-Colonel | Australia Southern | 1920 |
| McLEOD Norman | Staff Bandmaster | Australia Southern | 1955 |
| MANSON William | Captain | British Territory | 1920 |
| MARSDAL Bård | Corps Sergeant Major | Norway | 1972 |
| MARSHALL George | Bandmaster | British Territory | 1951 |
| MATSUDA Sanya (Dr) | | Japan | 1924 |
| MATUNJWA Joel Mbambo | Major | South Africa | 1942 |
| MEECH Alice | Corps Treasurer | British Territory | 1961 |
| MERRITT Violet | Brigadier | British Territory | 2000 |
| MILANS Henry F | | USA | 1942 |
| MOORE May (Mrs) | Senior Field-Captain | Canada | 1971 |
| MORGAN Harold | Bandmaster (Rtd) | Australia Eastern | 1981 |
| NDODA David Elijah Zenzeleni | Envoy | Zimbabwe | 1997 |
| NELANDER Eric | Corps Sergeant Major | Sweden | 1974 |
| NERY Jorge | Lt-Colonel | South America West | 1978 |
| NEWTON Charles | Field-Adjutant | Canada | 1946 |
| NGUGI Joshua | Commissioner | East Africa | 1998 |
| NHARI Lilian (Mrs) | Brigadier | Rhodesia | 1976 |
| NISIEWICZ Mary | Brigadier | USA Eastern | 1979 |
| NKU IMBIE David (Dr) | | D.R. Congo | 2018 |
| NOBLE William A (Dr) | Colonel | USA Southern | 1957 |
| OHARA Tamokichi | Envoy | Japan | 1961 |
| ORELLANA Luis | Envoy | South America West | 1962 |
| OSBORNE James | Commissioner | USA Southern | 2014 |
| OSBORNE Ruth | Commissioner | USA Southern | 2014 |
| OUCHTERLONY Hanna | Commissioner | Sweden | 1923 |
| OVESEN Emil | Staff-Captain | Norway | 1925 |
| OZANNE Marie | Major | British Territory | 1947 |
| PACQUETTE Catherine | Major | Caribbean | 2006 |
| PAIGE Clara | YPSM | USA Southern | 1989 |
| PALMER Robert Henry | Envoy | Australia Southern | 1952 |
| PARSELL Lily May (Mrs) | Corps Sergeant Major | Australia Southern | 1984 |
| PATHAM Yesu (Walter Keil) | Lt-Colonel | India Western | 1923 |
| PEACOCKE Elizabeth | Brigadier | Canada and Bermuda | 2000 |
| PEDERSEN Victor Barrett | Brigadier | Australia Southern | 1999 |
| PEDLAR Edwin Clendennam | Envoy | Canada | 1945 |
| PEETERMAN Gerardus C | Envoy | Holland | 1940 |
| PERIESWAMI Saratha | Lt-Colonel | Burma | 1989 |
| PESATORI Mario | Staff-Captain | Italy | 1928 |
| POTTINGER Hester | Guard Leader | USA Central | 1974 |
| PUNCHARD Alfred W | National Bandmaster | British Territory | 1937 |
| PURDUE Gertrude | Brigadier | USA South | 2005 |
| PURKIS Daniel | Ensign | British Territory | 1920 |
| RADER Damon | Lt-Colonel | USA Eastern | 2002 |
| RADER Lyell | Lt-Colonel | USA Eastern | 1984 |
| RANDALL Edward G | Envoy | Australia Eastern | 1981 |
| RASMUSSEN Tora E | Major | Denmark | 1992 |
| READ Harry | Commissioner | British Territory | 2019 |
| READ James E. | Soldier | Canada & Bermuda Territory | 2021 |
| RICE R. Eugene | Lieut-Colonel | USA West | 2004 |
| RICHES Lucy | Sister | British Territory | 1976 |
| RIDGERS Pamela (Mrs) | Over-60 Club Secretary | British Territory | 1981 |
| RIVE Faye | Lieut-Colonel | New Zealand and Fiji | 2004 |
| RIVE Lance | Lieut-Colonel | New Zealand and Fiji | 2004 |
| RIVE Philip | Lt-Colonel | New Zealand and Fiji | 1988 |
| RIVITT Dolores | Major | USA Western | 2000 |
| ROBB Anita (Mrs) | Colonel | USA Central | 2001 |
| RODIN Bertil | CSM | Latvia | 2003 |
| RÖMHILD E | YPSM | Denmark | 1939 |
| ROSTETT Henry T | Lt-Colonel | USA Central | 1976 |
| RUSSELL Mina | Lt-Colonel | USA Eastern | 1992 |
| SATTERFIELD Julius M | Brigadier | USA Southern | 1954 |
| SAULNIER Mary | | Canada and Bermuda | 2000 |
| SCHOCH Ruth | Major | Switzerland | 1996 |
| SCHRALE Ids Klaas | Envoy | The Netherlands | 1956 |
| SEGAWA Yasowa | Colonel | Japan | 1968 |
| SEILS Else (Mrs) | Colonel | Germany | 1986 |
| SERVAIS Muilton Eli | Corps Sergeant Major | USA Southern | 1991 |
| SHEPHERD William | Envoy | Australia Eastern | 1925 |
| SIBILIN Marie | Corps Sergeant Major | Switzerland | 1939 |
| SIGLEY Hilda | Major | Australia | 2004 |
| SIGSWORTH Alice | Senior - Major | British Territory | 1956 |
| SILFVERBERG Anne-Lise | Envoy | Denmark | 2013 |
| SILFVERBERG Erik | Bandmaster | Denmark | 2013 |
| SIMMONS Cyril J | Corps Sergeant Major (Rtd) | Canada and Bermuda | 1981 |
| SINCLAIR John | Corps Sergeant Major | Scotland | 1968 |
| SIPLEY Clifton | Brigadier | USA Eastern | 1996 |
| SLATER Richard | Lt-Colonel | British Territory | 1923 |
| SMITH J. Allister | Colonel | British Territory | 1923 |
| SMITH Jane (Mrs) | Sister | Scotland | 1959 |
| SORENSON Helen J (Mrs) | Corps Treasurer | USA Central | 1972 |
| SOUTER George | Colonel | British Territory | 1929 |
| STAIGER Frank O | Corps Sergeant Major (Rtd) | USA Central | 1981 |
| STAINES Alan | Envoy | Australia | 2007 |
| STEADMAN-ALLEN Ray | Lt-Colonel | British Territory | 2006 |
| STEVENS Arthur James | Divisional Bandmaster | Australia Southern | 1949 |
| STEWART Christine | Ensign | British Territory | 1920 |
| STICKELLS Elizabeth Jane (Mrs) | Sister | Canada | 1923 |
| STILLWELL Harry B | Bandmaster (Rtd) | USA Western | 1983 |
| STIMPSON Alfred | Corps Treasurer | British Territory | 1933 |
| STYLES Mary | Brigadier | South Africa | 1965 |
| SU Chien-Chi | Major | Northern China | 1946 |
| SUGHANANTHAM Grace | Mrs Commissioner | India South Eastern | 1988 |
| THAIN Alex | Bandmaster | Scotland | 1968 |
| THANGKIMA C. | Corps Sergeant Major | India Northern | 1990 |
| THOMAS Peggy | Deputy Bandmaster | USA Central | 2019 |
| THOMPSON (Mrs) Joseph | Sister | New Zealand | 1951 |
| THÖRNKVIST Hubert | Brigadier | Sweden | 1960 |
| TOFT Ester (Mrs) | Colonel | Sweden | 1920 |
| TURNER John William | Bandmaster | Australia Southern | 1946 |
| TWITCHIN Herbert W | Bandmaster | British Territory | 1939 |
| VALLENTGOED, Helena Dehaas | | Holland | 1949 |
| VENABLES Lily | YPSM | British Territory | 1979 |
| VICTOR N. L. | Corps Sergeant Major | India Central Territory | 2013 |
| VIVANTE Armand (Dr) | Envoy | South America East | 1980 |
| von WATTENWYL Christine | Lt-Colonel | Switzerland | 1964 |
| WALKER Wilbur | Envoy | Australia Eastern | 1990 |
| WALKLEY Maud (Mrs) | Home League Secretary | British Territory | 1963 |
| WARREN Mary | Sister | British Territory | 1960 |
| WEBB Joy | Major | British Territory | 2004 |
| WELLS Bertram | Adjutant | British Territory | 1923 |
| WHANG Sook Hyun | Envoy | Korea | 1971 |
| WHITE Polly | Sister | British Territory | 1940 |
| WILLCOX Harvey Stanley | Sgt | British Territory | 1944 |
| WILLE Vilhelm | Major | Denmark | 1920 |
| WILLIAMS Harry | Commissioner | UK | 2005 |
| YAMAMURO Gunpei | Commissioner | Japan | 1937 |
| YEE Check | Lt-Colonel | USA Western | 1997 |
| YIN Hung-Shun | Major | China | 1990 |
| ZIMMERMAN Emma | Major | Caribbean | 2000 |

== See also ==
- List of religion-related awards
