= Rebecca Jarrett =

English activist

- Born: 1846; London, England
- Died: 1928 (aged 81–82)
- Occupations: Prostitute, brothel-keeper, activist
- Known for: Eliza Armstrong Case

Rebecca Jarrett (1846–1928) was a former English prostitute and procuress who, with reformer and newspaper editor William Thomas Stead, fought against child prostitution and white slavery during the late 19th century.

== Biography ==
Jarrett was the youngest of seven children. Her father deserted the family and she was raised by her alcoholic mother, who prostituted her in London at the age of 12 (then the age of consent). Child prostitution was common at the time. Virgins especially commanded a higher price, at least partly due to the lower risk of catching an STI at a time when antibiotics were not yet available.

As an adult she supported herself through prostitution and later became a brothel-keeper, procuring girls and women to work for her. She tried to leave the world of prostitution several times, but was later lured back into the lifestyle while living in London. At age 36, by now an alcoholic and gravely ill, Jarrett was taken in by Florence Booth of the London Salvation Army. Jarrett prayed to "be a good woman and truly break away from the drink".

Jarrett died on 20 February 1928 at 259 Mare Street, Hackney, and was buried with Salvation Army honours at Abney Park Cemetery. Stoke Newington on 23 February 1928.

== Winchester ==
Jarrett was sent to Josephine Butler's "House of Rest" in Winchester in 1885 where she became involved in rescue work. With her knowledge of prostitution and brothels, she went into dangerous areas and persuaded women and girls to come with her to Winchester where she helped care for them. Boys were also rescued and cared for at Winchester. Jarrett also sought out young women in Portsmouth public houses.

== Eliza Armstrong Case ==
In June 1885, Bramwell Booth took Jarrett to meet W.T Stead. She helped Stead in obtaining a 13-year-old Eliza Armstrong from her mother, making sure the mother was well aware of their supposed 'purposes', and had her taken to a local midwife before being sent to a London brothel.

Posing as a rich businessman, Stead visited the brothel and had the girl drugged before she was brought to him (from where he had the girl taken to a Salvation Army home in France). Following a series of articles published by Stead in the Pall Mall Gazette, entitled The Maiden Tribute of Modern Babylon, which received an immediate public outcry resulting in the beginnings of the Social purity movement as rallies were held across the country and a petition sent to the House of Commons. However, despite public support behind them, both she and Stead were arrested on charges of abduction and indecent assault (possibly arranged by George Cavendish-Bentinck, a politician implicated in the sexual trafficking of boys in the Cleveland Street Scandal.) and Jarrett was imprisoned for six months.

After her release from Millbank Prison, she continued with her rescue work with the Salvation Army. Initially she returned to Winchester, but later returned to Florence Booth's care at 259 Mare Street, Hackney, where she remained until her death in early 1928.

== Bibliography ==
- Barry, Kathleen L. (1996). The Prostitution of Sexuality. NYU Press. ISBN 9780814723364.
- Eckley, Grace (2007). Maiden Tribute: A Life of W.T. Stead. Xlibris Corporation. ISBN 9781462838110.
- Neal, Diana (2006). Sex, Gender, and Religion: Josephine Butler Revisited. Peter Lang. ISBN 9780820481173.
- Robinson, James (2011). Divine Healing: The Formative Years: 1830–1880: Theological Roots in the Transatlantic World. Wipf and Stock Publishers. ISBN 9781621895862.
- Walker, Pamela J. (2001). Pulling the Devil's Kingdom Down: The Salvation Army in Victorian Britain. University of California Press. ISBN 9780520925854.
