= Edward Higgins =

General of The Salvation Army

General Edward Higgins
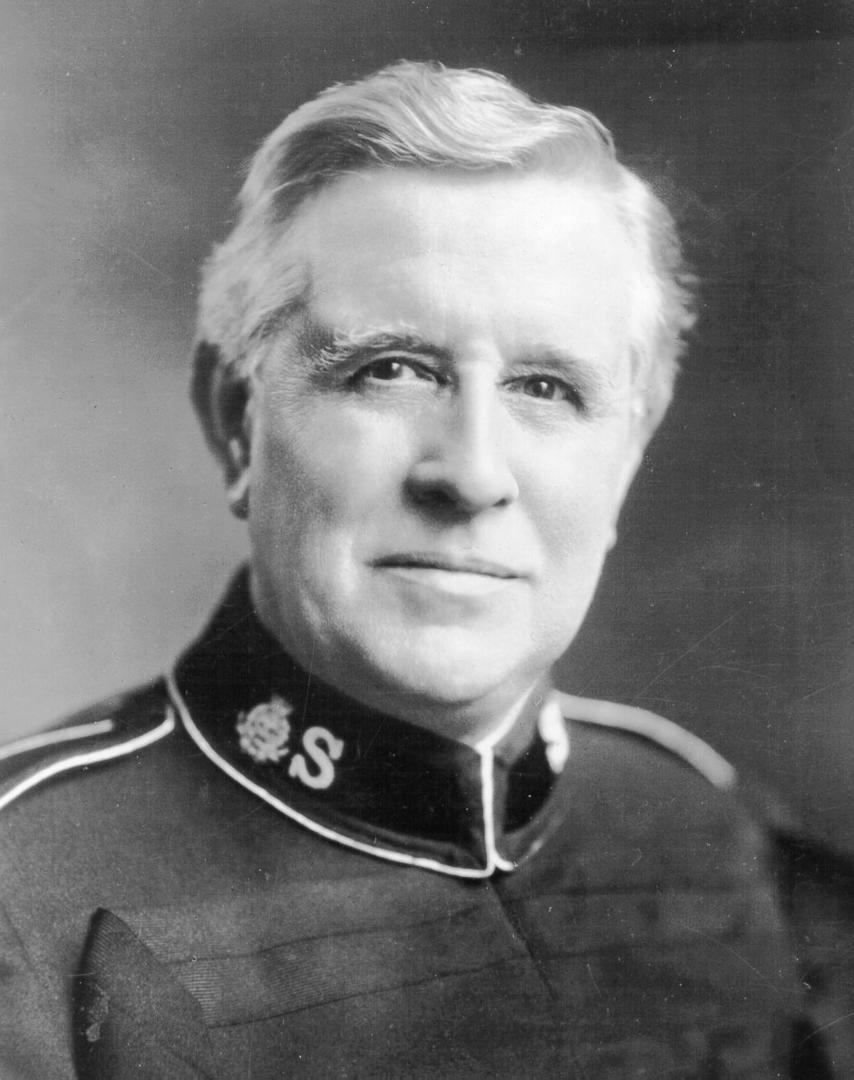

3rd General of The Salvation Army
- In office 14 February 1929 – 11 November 1934
- Preceded by: Bramwell Booth
- Succeeded by: Evangeline Booth

3rd Chief of the Staff of The Salvation Army
- In office 1919–1929
- General: Bramwell Booth
- Preceded by: T. Henry Howard
- Succeeded by: Henry Mapp

Personal details
- Born: 26 November 1864 Highbridge, Somerset, England
- Died: 14 December 1947 (aged 83)

Edward John Higgins (26 November 1864 – 14 December 1947) was the third General of The Salvation Army (1929–1934).

== Life ==
He was born in Highbridge, Somerset, England. His father became a much revered Commissioner in the Army's ranks, and travelled extensively in the interests of the organisation. His mother died when he was 8 years of age.

He became an officer in 1882 at the age of 17. Most of his earlier career was spent as an officer in the United States. During his time as an officer in the U.S., there was great divisions amongst the American Salvationists. He was known as the peace maker, thus earning him a lot of respect.

When Higgins was 42 years of age, Commissioner and Chief of the Staff Bramwell Booth gave him the oversight of the evangelistic work in the United Kingdom. By this time, Higgins was a great speaker, and had a lot of leadership skills which was needed in this role.

The Siege of London was a 10-day effort that took place in November 1912. It was an attempt to bring a prayer service to the people out in the core of London. It was such a huge success that it was repeated in 1913.

In 1919, Bramwell Booth appointed him as his Chief of the Staff. Higgins was never one to lead a political agenda, but he took his new role in stride. However, 1929 was a real test for Higgins and a critical time in the history of The Salvation Army, the calling of the first High Council to elect a new General. Bramwell Booth was asked to resign because of his ill health over the past several months. He refused, however, and was then reluctantly deposed from office, to be succeeded in the election of Higgins. As General Booth sued, the matter was put in the hands of the court. The court ruled in favour of the High Council. Thus, Higgins was the first General to be elected by the High Council.

The UK Parliament then passed the Salvation Army Act 1931.

As leader of the International Salvation Army, General Higgins still had his personal touch and warmth towards others. During his term in office as the General, he allowed a centenary of William Booth's birth to be celebrated. He also presided over a gathering in the Royal Albert Hall, and among those taking part was then Prime Minister, The Rt Hon. Stanley Baldwin.

Higgins retired from the post of General in 1934. His retirement meeting was held at the Royal Albert Hall on 1 November 1934, presided over by Prince Albert, then the Duke of York, who was accompanied by the Duchess.

The General and his wife then went to live in Florida, and later moved to Canada. He continued to prove himself a true "son of the Army" by maintaining as much interest in the relatively small corps around them as he had done in the greater issues when in office. Mrs General Catherine Higgins died in 1952.

Higgins wrote a number of books, including Stewards of God.

General Edward Higgins died at age 83.

== Family ==
In 1888, he married Captain Catherine Price. They had seven children.

Preceded by Bramwell Booth	General of The Salvation Army; 1929–1934	Succeeded by Evangeline Booth
