= Kate Booth =

British Salvation Army officer

Catherine Booth-Clibborn
- Catherine Booth-Clibborn
- Born: 18 September 1858; Gateshead, County Durham, England
- Died: 9 May 1955 (aged 96)
- Resting place: Highgate Cemetery, London
- Occupation: Christian evangelist
- Spouse: Arthur Clibborn (m. 1887; died 1939)
- Children: 10
- Parents: William Booth (father); Catherine Mumford (mother)
- Relatives: William Booth-Clibborn (son); Bramwell Booth (brother); Ballington Booth (brother); Evangeline Booth (sister); Emma Booth-Tucker (sister)

Catherine Booth-Clibborn (Katie Booth, 18 September 1858 – 9 May 1955) was an English Salvationist and evangelist who extended the Salvation Army into France and Switzerland against local opposition. She was the oldest daughter of William and Catherine Booth. She was also known as "la Maréchale".

== Early life ==
Born in Gateshead, where her father was serving as a minister, during her childhood Katie Booth was particularly close to William Booth's secretary, George Scott Railton, who lived with the Booth family for ten years and acted as her spiritual mentor. Saved by the age of thirteen, she began preaching at the age of fifteen and shared the platform with her father at the East London Christian Mission's annual conference in 1876.

== Salvation Army officer ==
As an adult Katie Booth brought The Salvation Army to France in March 1881. A captain, she led two lieutenants (one of whom was Florence Soper, who later married Katie's brother Bramwell Booth) in preaching the Gospel in Paris, wearing sandwichboards when the police forbade them to hand out leaflets. They were not well received. Their street-corner sermons were often interrupted by people pelting them with mud and stones. After repeated attempts by men on the roads to strangle them by their bonnet strings, they began pinning the strings on rather than sewing them. They lived in rented apartments where prostitutes lived in poor conditions. Progress was slow. Opposition was fierce, and those who were converted were given a rough time, sometimes being fired from their jobs. The newspaper reports in France were nearly unanimously critical.

Eventually, Captain Booth moved on to Switzerland, where the opposition was even fiercer. The authorities refused to allow her to rent halls in which to preach, and she was arrested, tried, acquitted, and subsequently deported from Switzerland for conducting an open-air meeting in a forest outside Neuchâtel.

== Marriage ==
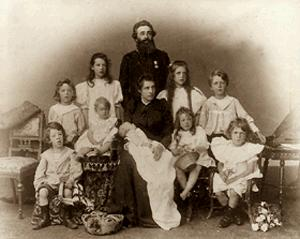
The Booth-Clibborn family in about 1900

Katie Booth married Arthur Clibborn at the age of 28 on 18 February 1887. It was a well-attended event and subject of interest to the press, which reported that at least 6,000 people were in attendance. On marriage, Arthur and Kate changed their surname by deed poll to Booth-Clibborn at the insistence of General Booth. They had ten children, including the Pentecostal preacher William Booth-Clibborn.

Following the birth of their tenth child the Booth-Clibborns resigned from The Salvation Army in January 1902, unhappy at the restrictive nature of the Army's military style of government. For the rest of her life she had almost no contact with her father or with those siblings who remained in The Salvation Army.

At her husband's wish, Katie and the children travelled with him to the cult leader John Alexander Dowie's Zion City, a township about 40 miles north of Chicago. Katie Booth-Clibborn did not believe Dowie's grandiose claims — in 1901 he declared himself the prophet Elijah the Restorer, and in 1904 the first apostle of Jesus Christ — and was offended by his criticism of her father.

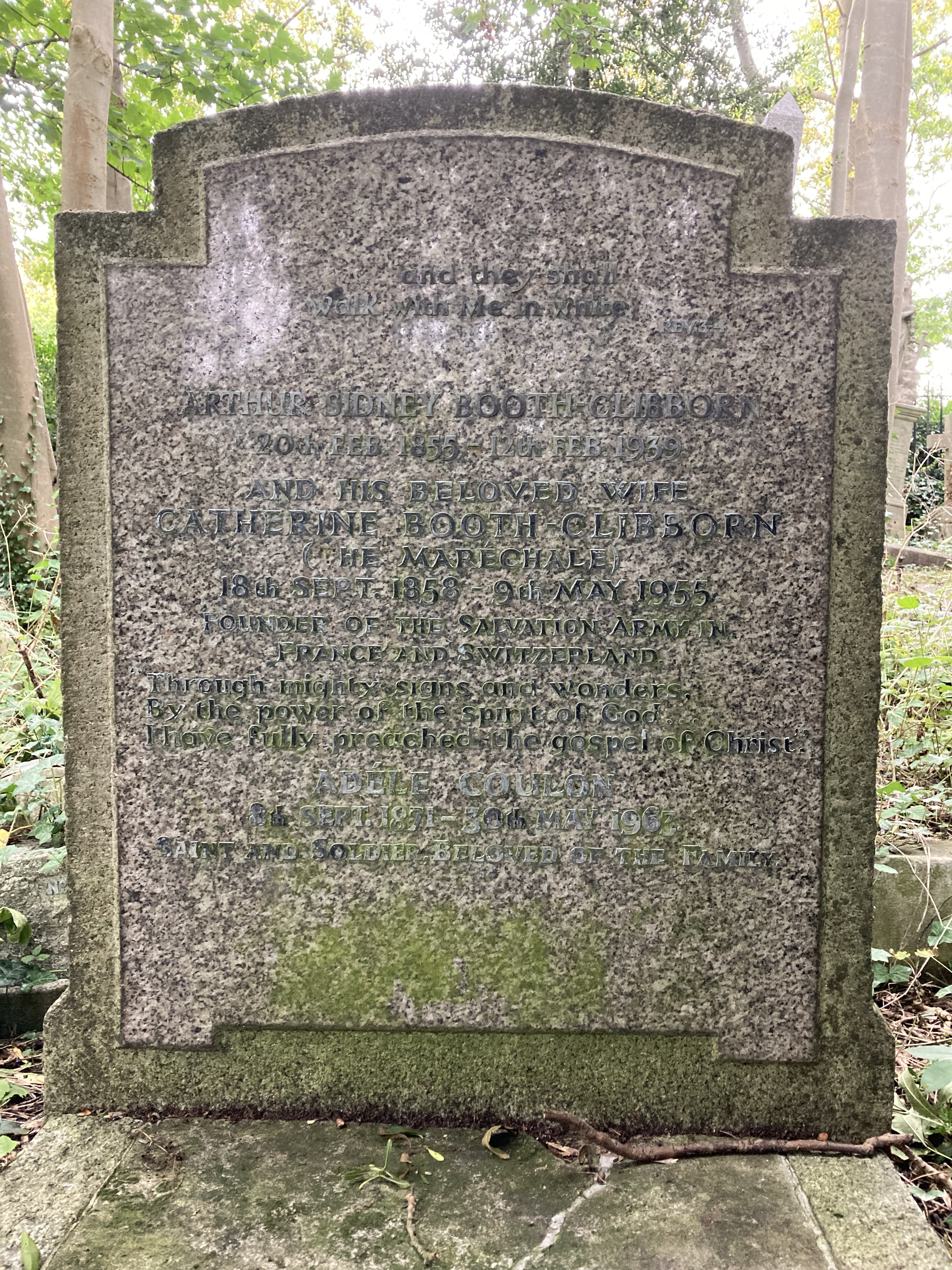
Family grave of Catherine Booth-Clibborn in Highgate Cemetery

== Later years ==
After becoming Pentecostals in 1906 the Booth-Clibborns together continued preaching and spreading the Gospel as travelling evangelists in Europe, the United States, and Australia for the rest of their lives.

The Kate Booth House, a Salvation Army residential environment for women and children fleeing family violence in Vancouver, British Columbia, was named in her honour.

On her death from double pneumonia in 1955 Katie Booth-Clibborn was buried on the eastern side of Highgate Cemetery (plot no.47536). Her earlier falling out with her father William Booth and the other Salvationist members of the family prevented her from being buried near her parents and deceased siblings in Abney Park Cemetery.

Her grandson Stanley Eric Francis Booth-Clibborn became the Anglican Bishop of Manchester.
