= Anna von Wattenwyl =

Swiss religious worker (1841–1927)

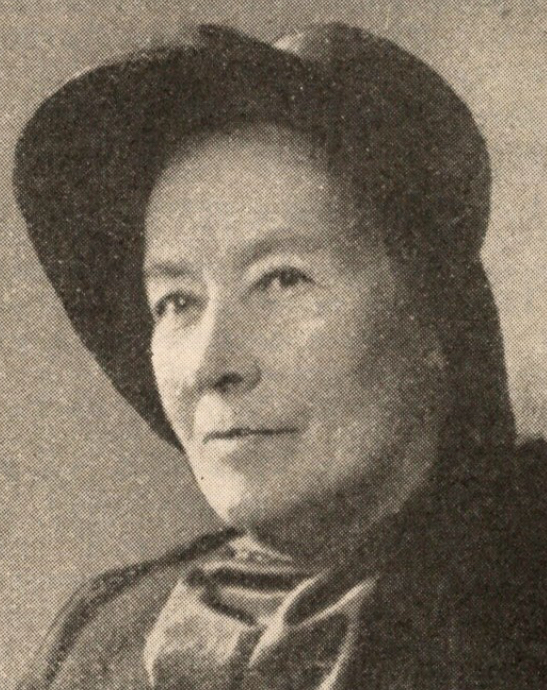
- Born: 1841; Lauenen, Switzerland
- Died: 12 January 1927 (aged 85–86); Switzerland
- Occupations: religious worker, missionary, nurse
- Parent(s): Gottlieb von Wattenwyl; Anna Maria von Wattenwyl
- Relatives: Christine von Wattenwyl (niece)

Anna von Wattenwyl (1841 – 12 January 1927) was a Swiss religious worker and a pioneer of the Salvation Army. She held the rank of colonel in the Army, and served as the Secretary of Women's Social Work, helping establish programs and centers in Switzerland. She was the last Swiss Salvation Army officer to be sentenced to prison in Basel, as participation in the Holiness movement at that time was a criminal offense in the Swiss Confederation.

== Biography ==
Von Wattenwyl was born in Lauenen in 1841 to an Irish mother, Anna Maria von Wattenwyl, and a Swiss father, Gottlieb von Wattenwyl. She was one of six children. Her father was the Reformed pastor of Reichenbach im Kandertal. Her family, an old patrician Bernese family, were part of the Swiss nobility. Her father's country estate, Schlingmoos, near Gurzelen, was a center of the Réveil movement.

When she was eighteen years old, von Wattenwyl travelled with her older sister to Paris and London, where they stayed with relatives. In London, she was introduced to The Salvation Army, an evangelical Methodist denomination and charitable organization. She joined the Salvation Army, much to the concern of her family and friends, as activities of the Holiness movement were forbidden in Switzerland. She became a pastoral assistant to the revivalist clergyman Franz Eugen Schlachter and worked as a translator for William Booth when he visited Switzerland.

In 1870, during the Franco-Prussian War, she worked as a hospital nurse.

Von Wattenwyl helped establish the organization in Switzerland, and founded a shelter for homeless people in Zürich. She was made an officer and promoted to the rank of colonel. She was later imprisoned for her work, which was still illegal at the time, and was the last Swiss Salvation Army officer to be sentenced to prison in Basel. In her later years, she founded an outpost for The Salvation Army in Gurzelen, near her family's estate. She served one term as the Army's Secretary of the Women's Social Work.

In 1921 she authored the book Einige Erinnerungen aus meinem Leben. She died on 12 January 1927. She is remembered in Barbara Traber's book 40 Important Berneses Women from Seven Centuries.
