= Eliza Armstrong case =

1885 major UK scandal involving child prostitution

The Eliza Armstrong case was a major scandal in the United Kingdom involving a child bought for prostitution for the purpose of exposing the evils of sexual slavery. While it achieved its purpose of helping to enable the passage of the Criminal Law Amendment Act 1885, it also brought unintended consequences to W. T. Stead.

== Background ==
Since the middle of the 19th century, efforts by the Social Purity movement, led by early feminists such as Josephine Butler and others, sought to improve the treatment of women and children in Victorian society. The movement scored a triumph when the Contagious Diseases Acts were repealed under pressure due to their double standard nature and ultimate ineffectiveness.

At the same time, the campaign had also turned towards the problem of prostitution, and male oppression of women. By the end of the 1870s, this had become particularly focused on fears that British females (women and children) were being lured—or abducted—to brothels on the Continent, especially since this was happening to children and women without their consent. Although the age of consent was raised to 13 when amendments to the Offences against the Person Act 1861 were made in 1875, the movement sought to further raise this to at least 16, but Parliament was reluctant to make this change.

However, a Criminal Law Amendment Bill to change this was introduced in 1881. While it passed the House of Lords easily in 1883 after a two-year Select committee study, it stalled twice in the House of Commons. Then in 1885, it was reintroduced for a third time, but again it was threatened to be set aside ultimately because of a political crisis and the upcoming general election that year.

== W. T. Stead ==
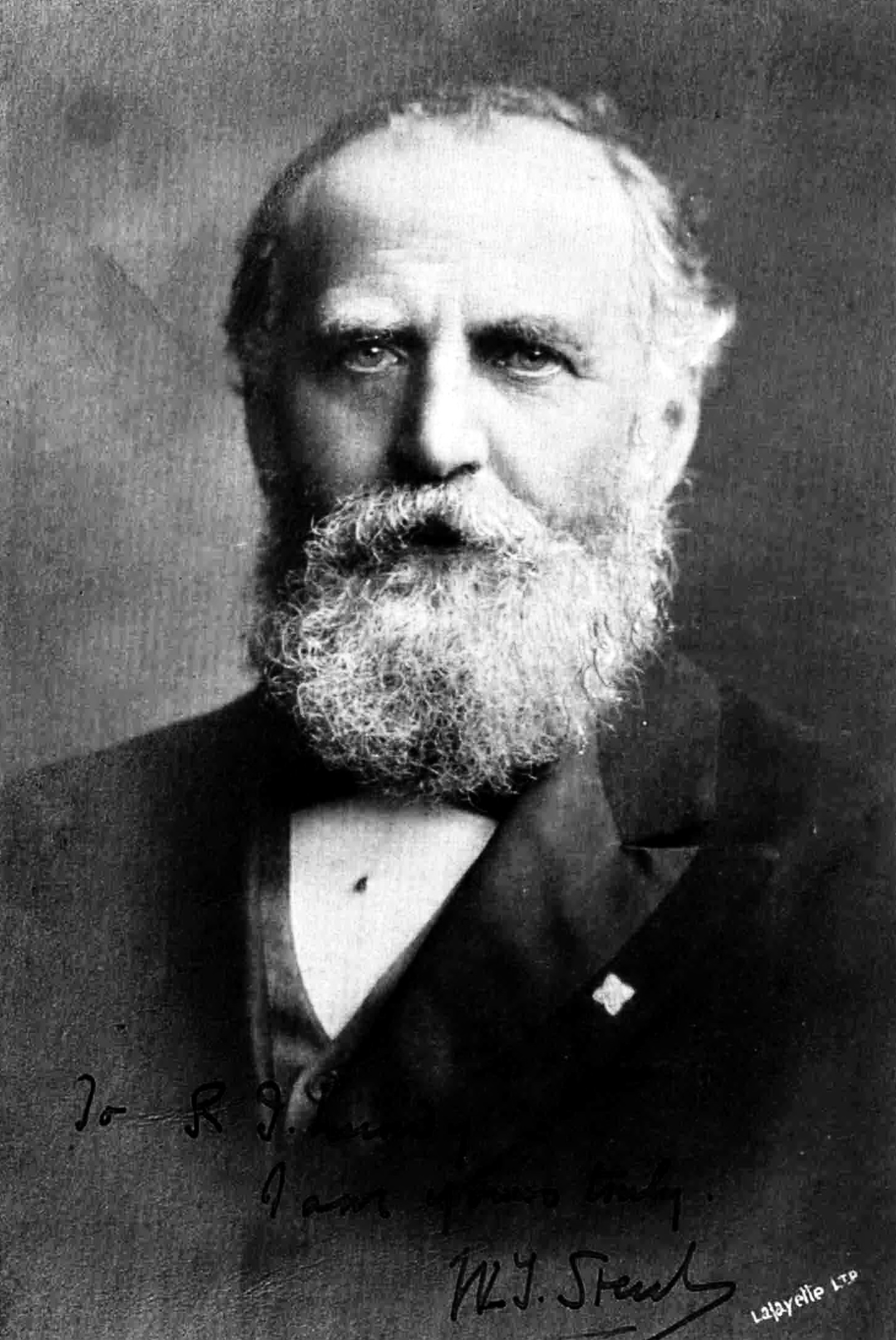
W.T. Stead in later years

Parliament recessed for the Whit Week bank holiday on 22 May, and upon the following day Benjamin Scott, anti-vice campaigner and the Chamberlain of the City of London, went to see W. T. Stead, editor of the Pall Mall Gazette. Stead was a pioneer of modern investigative journalism, with a flair for the sensational. He was a supporter of the Social Purity movement.

Scott told stories of sexually exploited children to Stead, who agreed to work for popular support. Stead set up a "Special and Secret Committee of Inquiry" to investigate child prostitution, which included Josephine Butler, as well as representatives of the London Committee for the Suppression of the Traffic in British Girls for the Purposes of Continental Prostitution (of which Scott was the chairman) and the Salvation Army. As part of the investigation, two women, an employee of the Pall Mall Gazette and a girl from the Salvation Army, posed as prostitutes and infiltrated brothels, leaving before they were forced to render sexual services. Butler spent ten days walking the streets of London with her son Georgie, posing as a brothel-keeper and a procurer, respectively; together they spent a total of £100 buying children in high-class brothels. Stead, in turn, also spoke to a former director of criminal investigation at Scotland Yard to get first-hand information; he later cast his net wide to include active and retired brothel keepers, pimps, procurers, prostitutes, rescue workers and jail chaplains.

Stead felt that he needed something more to make his point: he decided to purchase a girl to show that he could do it under the nose of the law.

== A £5 virgin ==
Bramwell Booth (c. 1881)

With the help of Josephine Butler and Bramwell Booth of the Salvation Army, Stead got in touch with Rebecca Jarrett, a reformed prostitute and brothel-keeper who was staying with Butler in Winchester as an assistant. Although Butler had no problem with Rebecca's meeting Stead, she did not know Stead's reason for doing so.

Stead prevailed upon Jarrett to help him to show that a 13-year-old girl could be bought from her parents and transported to the Continent. Despite her reluctance about returning to her old brothel contacts for help, Jarrett agreed to help.

Rebecca Jarrett met an old associate, a procuress called Nancy Broughton. Through her Jarrett learned of a 13-year-old named Eliza Armstrong, whose alcoholic mother Elizabeth was in need of money. She arranged for Jarrett to meet Mrs Armstrong, who lived in the Lisson Grove area of West London, and although Rebecca told the mother the girl was to serve as a maid to an old gentleman, she believed Mrs Armstrong understood that she was selling her daughter into prostitution. The mother agreed to sell her daughter for £5 (equivalent to £555.5 in 2025). On 3 June, the deal was finalised.

On the same day, Jarrett then took Eliza to a midwife and abortionist named Louise Mourez, who examined her and attested to her virginity and sold Jarrett a bottle of chloroform. Then Eliza was taken to a brothel and lightly drugged to await the arrival of her purchaser, who was Stead. Stead, anxious to play the part of libertine almost in full, drank a whole bottle of champagne, although he was a teetotaler. He entered Eliza's room and waited for her to awaken from her stupor. When she came to, Eliza screamed. Stead quickly left the room, letting the scream imply he had raped her. Eliza was quickly handed over to Bramwell Booth, who took her to France, where she was taken care of by a Salvationist family.

In the meantime, Stead wrote his story.

== The Maiden Tribute of Modern Babylon ==
On Saturday 4 July 1885, a "frank warning" was issued in the Pall Mall Gazette: "All those who are squeamish, and all those who are prudish, and all those who would prefer to live in a fool's paradise of imaginary innocence and purity, selfishly oblivious to the horrible realities which torment those whose lives are passed in the London inferno, will do well not to read the Pall Mall Gazette of Monday and the three following days". The public's appetite whetted sufficiently in anticipation, on Monday 6 July, Stead published the first instalments of The Maiden Tribute of Modern Babylon.

The first instalment taking up six whole pages, Stead attacked vice with eye-catching subheadings: "The Violation of Virgins", "The Confessions of a Brothel-Keeper", "How Girls Were Bought and Ruined". He argued that while consensual adult behavior was a matter of private morality and not a law enforcement issue, issues rife in London existed that did require legislative prohibition, listing five main areas where the law should intervene:

1. "The sale and purchase and violation of children.
2. The procuration of virgins.
3. The entrapping and ruin of women.
4. The international slave trade in girls.
5. Atrocities, brutalities, and unnatural crimes."

The theme of "Maiden Tribute" was child prostitution, the abduction, procurement and sale of young English virgins to Continental "pleasure palaces". Stead took his readers to the labyrinthine streets of London (intentionally recalling the Greek myth) to its darker side, exposing the flesh trade while exposing the corruption of those officials who not only turned a blind eye but also condoned such abuse. Stead acknowledged that his articles described the situation of a small minority of London's prostitutes, agreeing that most "have not come there by the road of organized rape", and that his focus was child victims who were "regularly procured; bought ... or enticed under various promises into the fatal chamber from which they are never allowed to emerge until they have lost what woman ought to value more than life". In particular, he drew a distinction between sexual immorality and sexual criminality, and criticized those members of Parliament who were responsible for the Bill's impending "extinction in the House of Commons" and hinted that they might have personal reasons to block any changes in the law.

The disclosure began properly in the 6 July publication, in which Stead reveals that he had asked if genuine maiden virgins could be procured, and being told it was so, asked whether such girls were willing and consensual, or aware of the intentions planned for them:

"But," I continued, "are these maids willing or unwilling parties to the transaction–that is, are they really maiden, not merely in being each a virgo intacta in the physical sense, but as being chaste girls who are not consenting parties to their seduction?" He looked surprised at my question, and then replied emphatically: "Of course they are rarely willing, and as a rule they do not know what they are coming for." "But," I said in amazement, "then do you mean to tell me that in very truth actual rapes, in the legal sense of the word, are constantly being perpetrated in London on unwilling virgins, purveyed and procured to rich men at so much a head by keepers of brothels?" "Certainly," said he, "there is not a doubt of it." "Why, "I exclaimed, "the very thought is enough to raise hell." "It is true," he said; "and although it ought to raise hell, it does not even raise the neighbours." "But do the girls cry out?" "Of course they do. But what avails screaming in a quiet bedroom? Remember, the utmost limit of howling or excessively violent screaming, such as a man or woman would make if actual murder was being attempted, is only two minutes, and the limit of screaming of any kind is only five ... But suppose the screams continue and you get uneasy, you begin to think whether you should not do something? Before you have made up your mind and got dressed the screams cease, and you think you were a fool for your pains ... Once a girl gets into such a house she is almost helpless, and may be ravished with comparative safety."

Stead commented that "Children of twelve and thirteen cannot offer any serious resistance. They only dimly comprehend what it all means. Their mothers sometimes consent to their seduction for the sake of the price paid by their seducer. The child goes to the introducing house as a sheep to the shambles. Once there, she is compelled to go through with it. No matter how brutal the man may be, she cannot escape". A madam confirmed the story for him, stating of one girl that she was rendered unconscious beforehand, and then coercively given the choice to continue or be homeless afterwards.

The last section of the first instalment bore special mention: under the subheading "A Child of Thirteen bought for £5" Stead related the story of Eliza, a purchased victim, whose name he changed to "Lily". Although he vouched "for the absolute accuracy of every fact in the narrative", Stead changed a number of details, and omitted the fact that "Lily's" purchaser was none other than himself. Describing himself as an "investigator" rather than an "informer", and having also promised not to use information obtained against those who provided it, he stated that he would disclose actual names and identifying details only to the two UK Archbishops, one M.P., two members of the House of Lords active in criminal legislation or child protection, and a past director of the CID.

=== Reactions to the "Maiden Tribute" ===
The "Maiden Tribute" was an instant hit. While W.H. Smith & Sons, who had a monopoly on all the news stalls, refused to sell the paper due to its lurid and prurient content, volunteers consisting of newsboys and members of the Salvation Army took over distribution. Even George Bernard Shaw telegraphed Stead offering to help. Crowds gathered in front of the Pall Mall Gazette offices. Second-hand copies of the paper sold for up to a shilling – twelve times its normal price.

Within days, Stead had been getting telegrams from across the Atlantic inquiring about the scandal. By the end of the series he had thrown Victorian society into an uproar about prostitution. Fearing riots on a national scale, the Home Secretary, Sir William Harcourt pleaded with Stead to cease publication of the articles; Stead replied that he would comply if the Bill would be passed without delay. Since Harcourt could not make that guarantee, Stead ordered the Pall Mall Gazette presses to continue until paper ran out.

Stead's revelations struck a responsive chord in the public. Amidst the hysteria, it provoked a wide variety of reform groups and prominent individuals to call for an end to the scandal. Dozens of protest meetings were held throughout London and the provincial towns. Thousands, including wagon loads of virgins dressed in white, marched to Hyde Park demanding that the Bill be passed. The government was soon on the defensive, and those members of Parliament who had previously opposed the Bill now understood that opposition would not only mean denying the existence of child prostitution, but condoning it as well. While many of them wanted to have the paper prosecuted under obscenity laws, they bowed to the inevitable. On Wednesday 8 July debate resumed over the bill, on 7 August it passed its third and final reading, and passed into law a week later.

== Unintended consequences ==
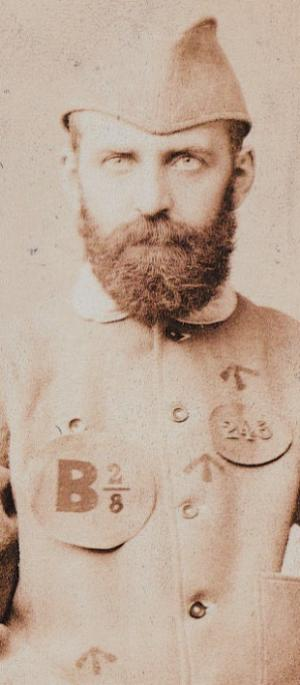
W. T. Stead photographed in his prison uniform

Although Stead was supported in his investigation by the Salvation Army and religious leaders including Cardinal Henry Edward Manning and Charles Ellicott, the Bishop of Bristol, his plan backfired on him. Rival newspapers, including The Times, investigated the original "Lily" and found that Stead was the "purchaser". Mrs Armstrong told police that she had not consented to put her daughter into prostitution, saying she understood that she would enter domestic service. Jarrett did not get the permission of the child's father.

Stead, Jarrett, Booth and Louise Mourez, the midwife, and two others appeared in court on 2 September charged with the assault and abduction for Eliza Armstrong without the agreement of her parents.

On 23 October, the defendants were brought to trial, with the Attorney General, Richard Webster, acting as prosecutor. Stead defended himself. He admitted that the girl was procured without the consent of the father and that he had no written evidence of payment to the mother. Stead had relied on Rebecca Jarrett's word, and was unable to prove Mrs Armstrong's complicity in the crime. Stead, Jarrett and Mourez were found guilty of abduction and procurement. The others were acquitted. Jarrett and Mourez were sentenced to six months in jail and Stead was sentenced to three months. He was sent to Coldbath Fields Prison for three days and then to Holloway as a first-class inmate for the rest of his sentence.

== Aftermath ==
Many groups protested against Stead's imprisonment, and he was treated well in prison. "Never had I a pleasanter holiday, a more charming season of repose", he later said. In Holloway as a "first class misdemeanant" he had his own room with an open fire and a fellow prisoner as a servant to tend to him. His wife and children were allowed in for Christmas. Mourez died in jail. Jarrett survived her six months with hard labour. While in prison, Stead continued to edit the Pall Mall Gazette, and his Christmas card played up his martyrdom. Stead wrote a threepenny pamphlet of his prison experience soon after his release. He asked the prison governor whether he could keep his prison uniform, although he spent much of his sentence in ordinary civilian street clothes. The governor agreed, and thereafter, every 10 November, the anniversary of his conviction, Stead would dress up in his prison garb to remind people of his "triumph".

After the trial the prosecutor, Harry Bodkin Poland, started a public subscription for the Armstrong family through an advertisement in The Times. The money paid for Eliza to attend Princess Louise Home for the Protection of Young Girls in Wanstead, receiving training to become a servant. Later in her life, she lived in North East England, married twice and had six children from her first and four children from her second marriage. As late as 1906, she still maintained a friendly correspondence with Stead. She died in 1938, 66 years old.

Stead died in the sinking of the RMS Titanic.

== In popular culture ==
A six-part BBC television drama series, The Case of Eliza Armstrong, was broadcast in 1974. It was directed by Rodney Bennett. A tie-in book, The Case of Eliza Armstrong: "A Child of 13 Bought for £5" by Alison Plowden was published by the BBC the same year.

== See also ==
- White slave trade affair
