= Catherine Bramwell-Booth =

British Salvation Army officer (1883–1987)

Commissioner Catherine Bramwell-Booth CBE, OF
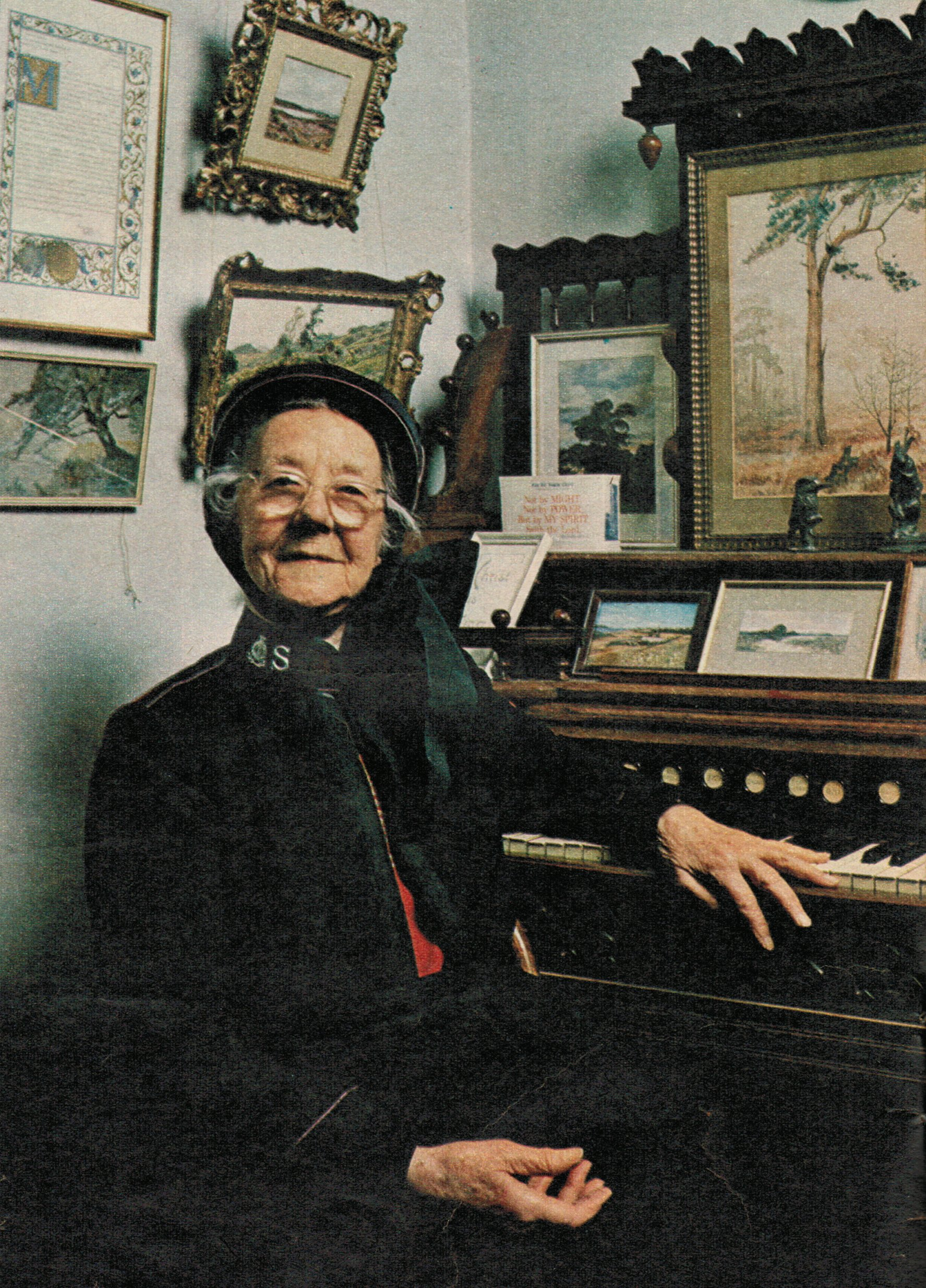
- Catherine Bramwell-Booth photographed at North Court in Finchampstead in 1977

Captain in The Salvation Army
- In office 1903–1907

Training officer for Woman at the Salvation Army International Training College
- In office 1907–1917

Salvation Army Secretary for Europe
- In office 1917–1926

Colonel/Commissioner of The Salvation Army
- In office 1926 – 1947 (retired)

Personal details
- Born: Catherine Booth-Booth; 20 July 1883 Hadley Wood, London, England
- Died: 3 October 1987 (aged 104) Finchampstead, Berkshire
- Relations: General Bramwell Booth, father, General William Booth, grandfather

Commissioner Catherine Bramwell-Booth CBE OF, born Catherine Booth (20 July 1883 – 3 October 1987), Salvation Army officer, was one of seven children born to General Bramwell Booth and Florence Eleanor Soper, and was the granddaughter of the Salvation Army's Founder, General William Booth and his wife Catherine Mumford, known as the 'Mother of the Salvation Army'. In her later years Bramwell-Booth became well-known through her books and various radio and television appearances. Bramwell-Booth lived to be 104.

== Early years ==
At birth she was dedicated by her grandfather, General William Booth, and from her infancy she was involved in the demands which Salvation Army service made upon her parents, being taken with them to their various appointments whenever their busy schedules required it. More settled periods during her childhood were spent at Hadley Wood, which was 'so perfect that I have never written about it, as no-one would believe me'.

Her mother, Florence Eleanor Soper, disapproved of outside influences acting on the tender minds of her children and taught them all herself for two hours every morning. Her own involvement in Army service began in the Corps at High Barnet, playing in the band and singing trios with her sisters in the open-air meetings. She was sworn-in as a Salvation Army soldier on her 15th birthday and was later given responsibility for the newly formed 'Band of Love'.

== The Salvation Army officer ==
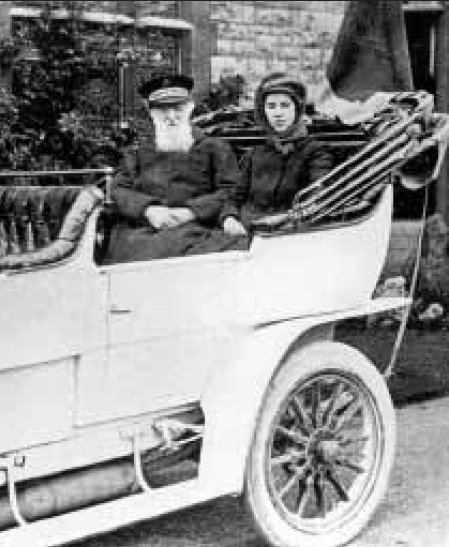
With her grandfather the General during the 1904 motorcade

In her late teens, she became aware of the call to officership but her natural shyness made her reluctant to respond; however, eventually realising that God's power would help her, she added her father's Christian name to her surname and entered the Salvation Army Training College at Clapton in 1903, aged 19. She was a lively cadet with a great sense of fun but she also applied herself to training. Later, as a cadet-sergeant, she was remembered for her individual care of cadets.

Bramwell-Booth was given her first posting in 1904 as a Captain in Bath. She then held appointments in a number of important provincial centres, being placed in charge of the Salvation Army's evangelical work. In 1904, she joined her grandfather, General Booth, as he travelled in a motorcade around the country, preaching from his car in village and town centres. From 1907 to 1917, she was involved in the training of women officers at the Army's International Training College in Clapton in London.

In 1913, she preached in Russia and in 1917 made headlines when she led a rescue team into the area devastated by the Silvertown TNT explosion at the Brunner-Mond munitions factory in what has become known as the Silvertown explosion, when seventy-three people died and hundreds were injured. Later, she was to be involved with relief work in Europe after both World War I and World War II.

She left the International Training College in 1917 to become the Under Secretary for Europe for Salvation Army work in Europe, being attached to the International Headquarters in London. In 1926, she was promoted to colonel, and from then until 1946 she was in charge of the Army's social work among women in Great Britain. In 1927 she was promoted to Commissioner, and became closely involved in the Salvation Army's social welfare activities, dealing with everything from orphaned children to the elderly residents of the Salvation Army eventide homes. From 1946, she was international secretary for Europe until her retirement in 1948.

Bramwell-Booth was nominated three times for the Generalship of the Salvation Army, in 1934, 1939, and 1946. However, on each occasion she was unsuccessful, it possibly being felt that leadership of the Salvation Army should not appear to be exclusive to the Booth 'dynasty', as both her father and aunt Evangeline Booth had previously been Generals.

== Later life and honours ==
Lt. Col. Catherine Bramwell-Booth in about 1920

Bramwell-Booth wrote several books, including biographies of her grandmother, Catherine Mumford, and of her father Bramwell Booth. This brought her a certain fame, and, because of her engaging personality, during the 1970s and 1980s, she made frequent appearances on radio and television programmes, being interviewed by, among others, Malcolm Muggeridge, Russell Harty and Roy Plomley on Desert Island Discs in 1979.

She reached her greatest audience through her appearance on Parkinson, hosted by Michael Parkinson at Christmas 1979. In 1971 she was appointed CBE, and in 1977, at the age of 93, as a lifelong teetotaller, she was delighted to receive the Guild of Professional Toastmasters best speaker award. She was presented with the Humanitarian Award of 1981 by the Variety Clubs International, and in 1983 was awarded the Salvation Army's prestigious 'Order of the Founder' (OF).

Bramwell-Booth died at the age of 104 on 3 October 1987, at her home, North Court, in Finchampstead, Berkshire, where she lived with two of her sisters. She never married. She is buried in the churchyard of St James, Finchampstead.

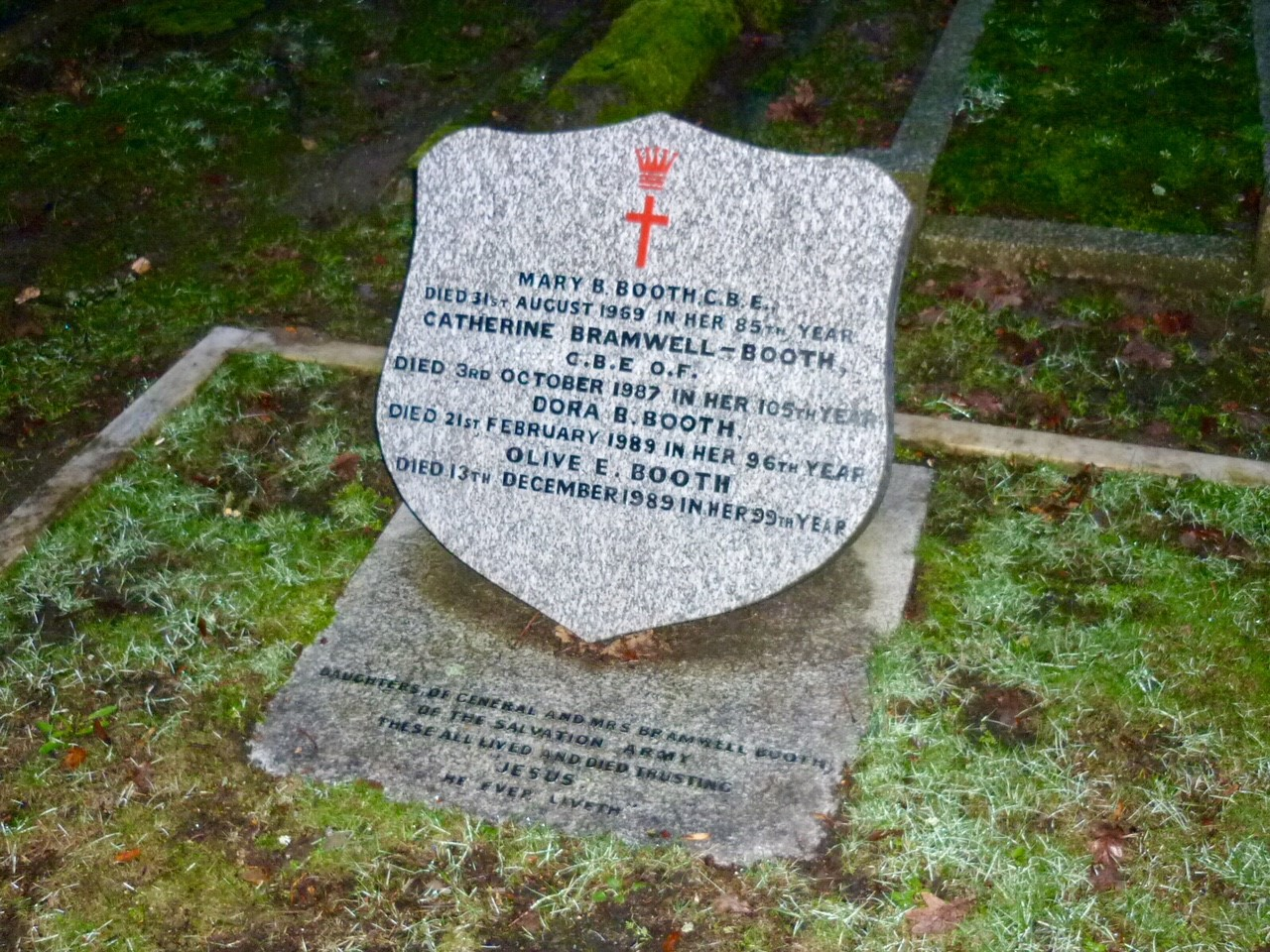
The grave of Catherine Bramwell-Booth in the churchyard of St James, Finchampstead.

== Publications ==
- Bramwell Booth Pub. by Rich and Cowan, 1933.
- Catherine Booth: the Story of Her Loves Pub. by Hodder & Stoughton, London, 1970.
- Fighting for the King Pub. by Hodder and Stoughton, London, 1983.
- Letters: Catherine Bramwell-Booth Pub. by Lion, 1986.
- With Ted Harrison: Commissioner Catherine Pub. by Darton, Longman and Todd, London, 1983.

== Books about Bramwell-Booth ==
- Batchelor, Mary: Catherine Bramwell-Booth Pub. by Lion, 1986.
- Swift, Catherine M.: Catherine Bramwell-Booth Pub. by Marshall Pickering, 1989.
