= Egil Kjølner =

Norwegian politician

Egil Kjølner (8 January 1920 – 25 February 2010) was a Norwegian politician for the Christian Democratic Party.

He was born in Fredrikstad, but moved to Bærum in 1927. He was a member of Bærum municipal council for twenty years and Akershus county council for eight years. He served as a deputy representative to the Parliament of Norway during the terms 1969–1973 and 1973–1977.

He was a secondary school headmaster from 1969 to 1980, and was also active in the Salvation Army. He was decorated with the Order of the Founder as well as the HM The King's Medal of Merit. Not long before his death he was said to be the only living Norwegian with the Order of the Founder. He died in February 2010.
