= Evangeline Booth House =

Historic house in New York, United States

- U.S. National Register of Historic Places
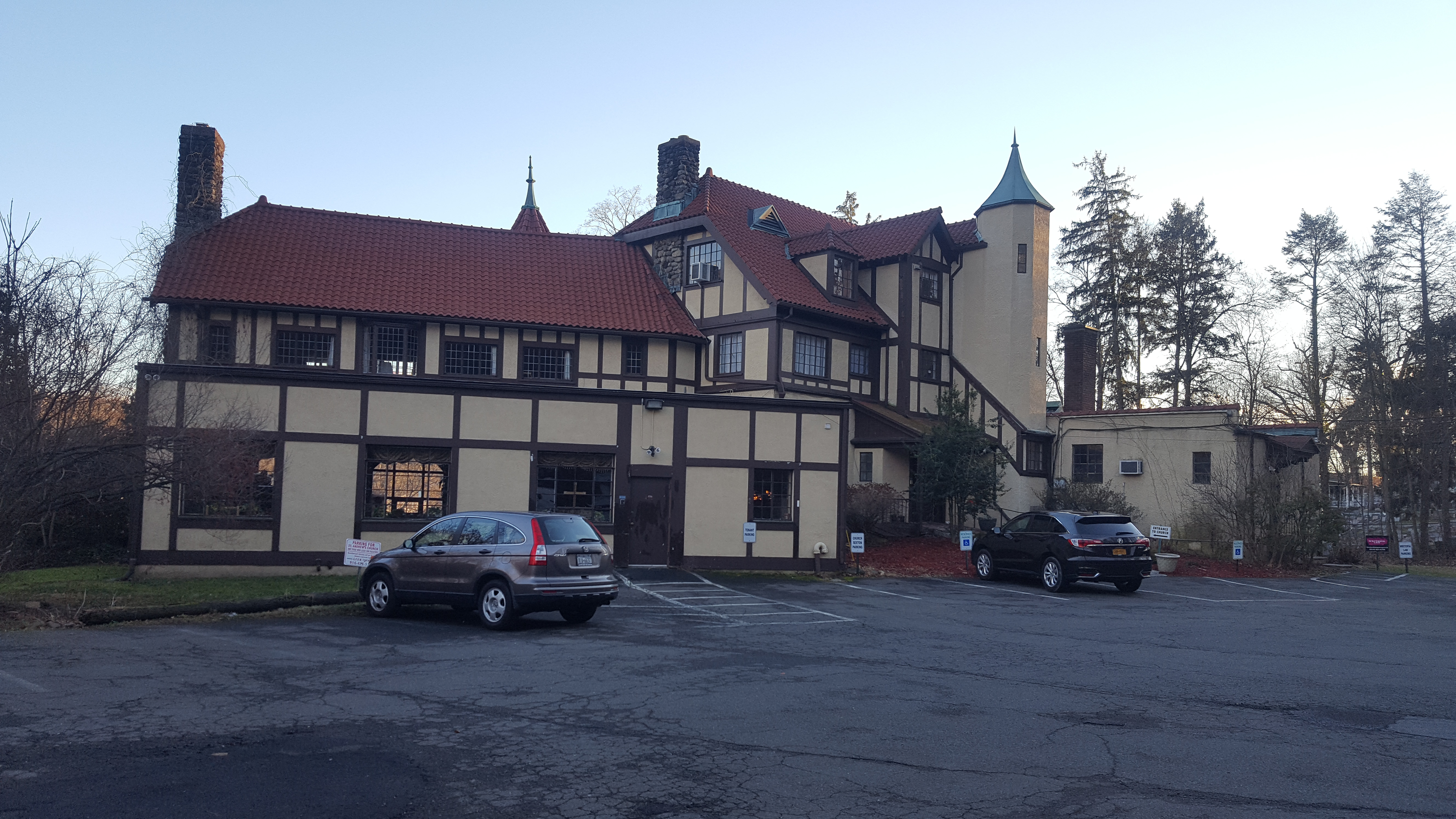

- Location within New York Location within the United States
- Location: 101 N Central Ave, Hartsdale, New York
- Coordinates: 41°01′12″N 73°47′50″W
- Area: 5.5 acres (2.2 ha)
- Built: c. 1870, c. 1919
- Built by: Walker, James E.
- Architectural style: Tudor Revival
- NRHP reference No.: 11000040
- Added to NRHP: February 22, 2011

The Evangeline Booth House (now known as St. Andrew's Episcopal Church) is a historic house in the hamlet of Hartsdale, Westchester County, New York.

== Description and story ==
It was originally built about 1870 and extensively remodeled and enlarged after being acquired by Evangeline Booth (1865–1950) in 1919. It is a 2 1/2-story, Y-shaped, fieldstone and half-timbered building. It has a high gable roof with clipped gable ends covered in red "Spanish" tiles. The house is in the Tudor Revival style. It features a large stone chimney, a limestone-trimmed Tudor-arched entrance, and an octagonal stair tower. Additions to the dwelling made by the church include a parish hall and chapel (1955). Also on the property are a contributing carriage house and stone garage. Evangeline Booth resided here until she died in 1950. She donated it to the Salvation Army, who sold it in 1951 to the St. Andrew's Episcopal Church.

It was added to the National Register of Historic Places on February 22, 2011.

== See also ==
- National Register of Historic Places listings in southern Westchester County, New York
