= Evangeline Booth College =

Theological college

Coordinates: 33°43′37.51″N 84°24′22.65″W

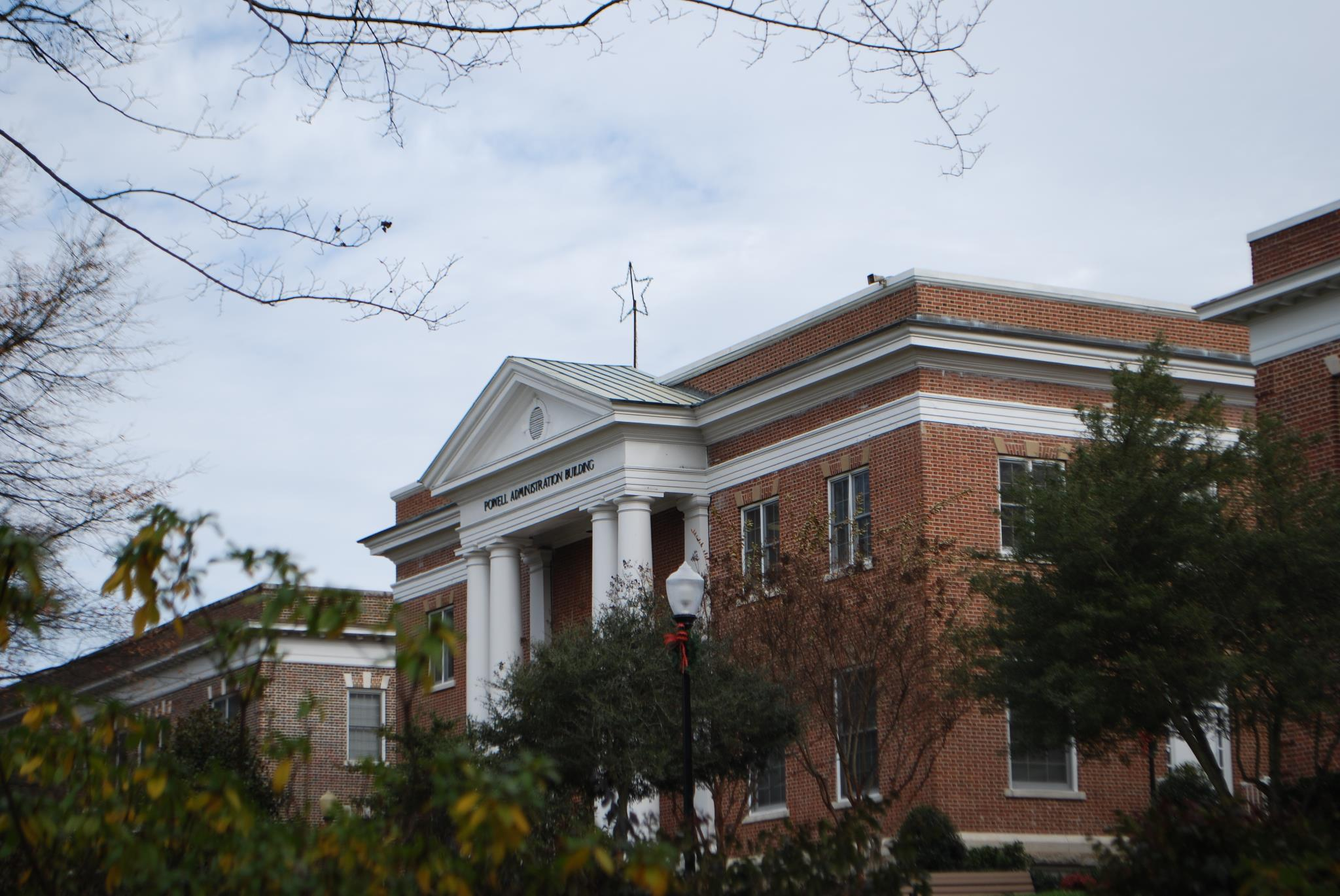
- Type: Private College
- Established: 1927
- Parent institution: The Salvation Army
- Religious affiliation: Salvationist Christian
- President: Major Zachary Bell
- Location: Atlanta, Georgia, U.S.
- Campus: Urban
- Nickname: EBC, Training College
- Website: salvationarmyebc.org

The Salvation Army Evangeline Booth College, or EBC, is a theological college administered by The Salvation Army. The school is located in Atlanta, Georgia and is named after General Evangeline Booth, the 4th General of The Salvation Army. The Evangeline Booth College follows the Salvation Army's ranking system where there are first-year and second-year cadets.

Evangeline Booth College was established for the training of Salvation Army Officers. Enrolled students are referred to as either first-year or second-year cadets. Once a cadet completes two years of training and receives his/her diploma, the cadet is commissioned as a Salvation Army officer with the rank of lieutenant.

According to the Evangeline Booth College website, the aim of the college is to "To develop officers possessing such blood and fire spirit that they will be enabled to sustain and advance the interest of The Salvation Army."

== Requirements ==
Students must dedicate their career to The Salvation Army. They are required to be Christians who adopt the eleven doctrines of The Salvation Army, and they must wear the uniform prescribed by The Salvation Army. Students are not allowed to be in any sort of financial debt, whether that be owing money on a mortgage, a vehicle, student or private loans, etc. To graduate, students must complete coursework in addition to summer and winter assignments in which they will be expected to work in a Salvation Army location. Additionally, students must partake in mission trips that often occur outside of the United States.

The Salvation Army Southern Territory Historical Center is also located at the college.
