= Christine von Wattenwyl =

Swiss religious worker

- Born: 25 November 1888; Uttigen, Switzerland
- Died: 25 January 1964; Oberdiessbach, Switzerland
- Occupation(s): religious worker, missionary
- Relatives: Anna von Wattenwyl (aunt)
- Awards: Order of the Founder

Christine von Wattenwyl (25 November 1888 – 25 January 1964) was a Swiss Salvationist officer and religious worker. She was a lieutenant colonel in the Salvation Army and a pioneer of prison care in Switzerland. In 1964, she was posthumously awarded the Order of the Founder.

== Biography ==
Christine von Wattenwyl was born on 25 November 1888 to a family of the Swiss nobility. Her parents were Rudolf von Wattenwyl and Pauline von Wattenwyl. She was raised in the Swiss Reformed Church. Inspired by her aunt, Anna von Wattenwyl, she converted to Salvationism.

In 1912, von Wattenwyl enrolled in the Salvation Army's officers' school in London. She was appointed to the rank of lieutenant colonel.

From 1914 to 1916, she worked for the church in Paris before returning to Switzerland to work in Le Locle, Orbe, and Sainte-Croix. From 1921 until the end of her career, von Wattenwyl was based at the Salvation Army in Bern. She spent her life serving prisoners and was a pioneer for prison care for the Salvation Army in Switzerland. Modeled after the prison welfare system of the Salvation Army in Japan, von Wattenwyl set up an independent branch of prison welfare that included spiritual and material support for inmates and their families and aftercare programs following inmate release.

Von Wattenwyl died on 25 January 1964 in Oberdiessbach. She was posthumously awarded the Order of the Founder that same year, becoming the third Swiss woman to receive the honor.
