= Arthur Booth-Clibborn =

Irish Salvation Army officer (1855-1939)

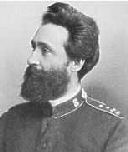
- Born: Arthur Sydney Clibborn; 1855; Moate, Westmeath, Ireland
- Died: 20 February 1939 (aged 83–84)
- Education: University of Lausanne
- Known for: Salvation Army; Pentecostal Church
- Spouse: Kate Booth (m. 1887)
- Children: 10
- Relatives: William Booth (father-in-law); Catherine Booth (mother-in-law)

Commissioner Arthur Sydney Booth-Clibborn (né Clibborn) (1855 – 20 February 1939) was a pioneering Salvation Army officer in France and Switzerland. He was the husband of Kate Booth, the oldest daughter of General William and Catherine Booth.

== Early life ==
Clibborn was born in Moate, County Westmeath in Ireland, the son of a linen mill owner. At age 13 he was sent to boarding school in France and Switzerland. He graduated from the University of Lausanne. During this time abroad, he developed his capacity for languages. At age 26 he was appointed a Quaker minister.

== Salvation Army career ==
Joining The Salvation Army in 1881 at the invitation of General William Booth, Major Clibborn became Kate Booth’s chief of staff during her mission in France. They married on 18 February 1887. On marriage, Arthur and Kate changed their surname by deed poll to Booth-Clibborn at the insistence of General Booth. They had ten children, including the Pentecostal preacher William Emmanuel Booth-Clibborn. A grandson was Stanley Eric Francis Booth-Clibborn, who became the Anglican Bishop of Manchester.

The Booth-Clibborns were posted by The Salvation Army to Switzerland in 1889. However, opposition to their movement eventually led to the Swiss government's order that all Salvation Army halls be closed, and Arthur Booth-Clibborn was imprisoned for a time.

Following the birth of their tenth child the Booth-Clibborns resigned from The Salvation Army in January 1902, unhappy at the restrictive nature of the Army's military style of government. A commission of enquiry had already decided to dismiss him from officership.

== Post-Salvation Army ==
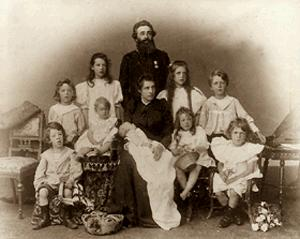
The Booth-Clibborn family in about 1900

At her husband's wish, Kate and the children travelled with him to the religious leader John Alexander Dowie's Zion City, a township about 40 miles north of Chicago. Kate Booth-Clibborn did not believe Dowie's grandiose claims – in 1901 he declared himself the prophet Elijah the Restorer, and in 1904 the first apostle of Jesus Christ – and she was offended by his criticism of her father even though her resignation had made her an outcast from both her family and The Salvation Army. For the rest of her life Kate Booth-Clibborn had almost no contact with her father or with those siblings who remained in The Salvation Army.

After converting to Pentecostalism in 1906 the Booth-Clibborns together continued preaching and spreading the Gospel as travelling evangelists in Europe, the United States, and Australia for the rest of their lives.
