= Stanley Booth-Clibborn =

British Anglican bishop (1924–1996)

The Right Reverend Stanley Booth-Clibborn
- Bishop of Manchester
- Church: Church of England
- Province: York
- Diocese: Manchester
- In office: 1979 to 1992
- Predecessor: Patrick Rodger
- Successor: Christopher Mayfield
- Other post: Vicar of the Church of St Mary the Great, Cambridge (1970–1979)

Orders
- Ordination: 1952 (deacon); 1953 (priest)
- Consecration: 1979 by Stuart Blanch

Personal details
- Born: Stanley Eric Francis Booth-Clibborn; 20 October 1924 London, England
- Died: 6 March 1996 (aged 71) Edinburgh, Scotland
- Denomination: Anglicanism
- Spouse: Anne Forrester (m. 1958)
- Children: Four
- Education: Highgate School
- Alma mater: Oriel College, Oxford; Westcott House, Cambridge

Stanley Eric Francis Booth-Clibborn (20 October 1924 – 6 March 1996) was a British Anglican bishop in the late 20th century. He was Bishop of Manchester from 1979 to 1992. He was well known during his episcopal ministry for his outspoken political views and interventions on behalf of the poor.

Booth-Clibborn was the great-grandson of William Booth, the founder of The Salvation Army. He was educated at Highgate School. He was called up to the British Army during World War II, and served in the Royal Artillery and the Royal Indian Artillery. Having returned to England after five years military service, he studied history at Oriel College, Oxford, and then trained for the priesthood at Westcott House, Cambridge.

Booth-Clibborn was ordained in the Church of England. He served two curacies in the Diocese of Sheffield in the first half of the 1950s. In 1956, he emigrated to Kenya where he worked for the Christian Council of Kenya, and then for a newspaper. In 1967, he returned to England and was Priest-in-Charge of a group of inner-city churches in Lincoln. Then, from 1970 to 1979, he was Vicar of the Church of St Mary the Great, Cambridge; Great St Mary's is the university church of the University of Cambridge.

In 1978, it was announced that Booth-Clibborn would be the next Bishop of Manchester, the diocesan bishop of the Diocese of Manchester in the north of England. The following year, he was consecrated a bishop and took up the post. In 1985, he joined the House of Lords as a Lord Spiritual. He retired from full-time ministry in 1992.

== Early life and education ==
Booth-Clibborn was born on 20 October 1924 in London, England. He was the grandson of Arthur Clibborn and Kate Booth, the daughter of The Salvation Army founder William Booth. His father, John Eric Booth-Clibborn, was a Church of England clergyman.

Booth-Clibborn was educated at Highgate School, then an all-boys private school in Highgate, London. He was for a time an evacuee when his school was moved to the country to escape The Blitz. Having returned from military service, he spent three years studying modern history at Oriel College, Oxford. In 1950, he was elected Secretary of the Oxford Union, having stood as a socialist. He graduated from the University of Oxford with a second-class Bachelor of Arts degree in 1951. In 1950, he entered Westcott House, Cambridge, an Anglican theological college in the Liberal Catholic tradition. There, he spent the next two years training for the priesthood.

== Military service ==
During the Second World War, Booth-Clibborn served with the British Army. On 25 December 1943, he was commissioned into the Royal Regiment of Artillery as a second lieutenant. He spent two years serving in India during which he was attached to the Royal Indian Artillery. He was demobilised in 1948 after five years of military service. On 14 January 1953, he relinquished his commission and was granted the honorary rank of captain.

== Ordained ministry ==
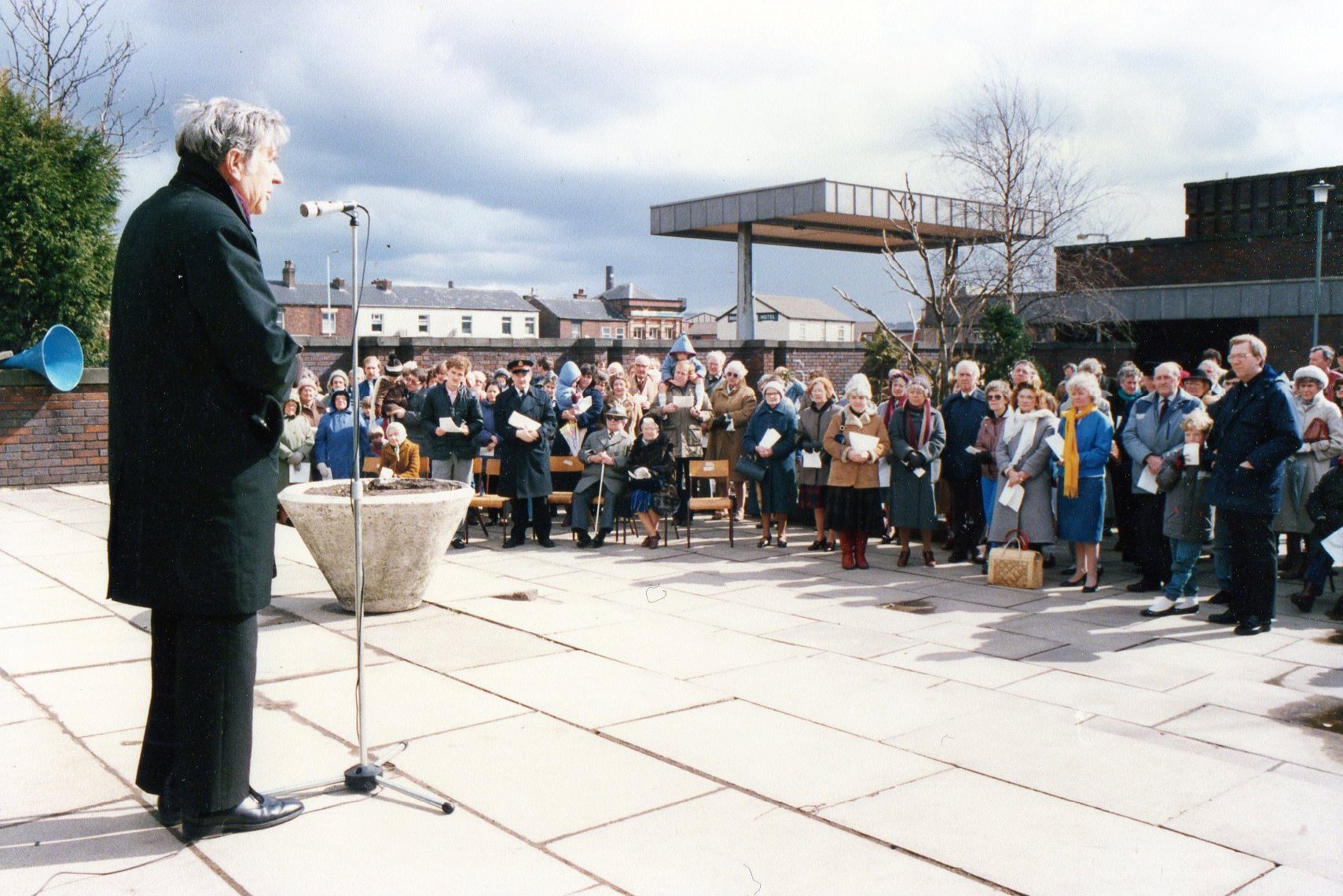
Booth-Clibborn preaching at an open air gathering in the 1980s

Booth-Clibborn was ordained in the Church of England as a deacon in 1952 and as a priest in 1953. From 1952 to 1954, he served his curacy in Christ Church, Heeley in the Diocese of Sheffield. He then served as curate of the Parish of Attercliffe with Carbrook, also in the Diocese of Sheffield.

In 1956, Booth-Clibborn and his wife emigrated to Kenya. He was Training Secretary to the Christian Council of Kenya from 1956 to 1963. This was an ecumenical organisation and convinced him of the importance of cross-denominational unity. He was then editor-in-chief of the East African Venture Newspapers based in Nairobi.

In 1967 Booth-Clibborn returned to England. From 1967 to 1970, he was Priest-in-Charge of the Lincoln City Centre Team Ministry. He was then Vicar of the Church of St Mary the Great, Cambridge, between 1970 and 1979; the church of the University of Cambridge. In a letter begging him to accept the appointment, Bishop John Robinson stated "Do accept – we are scraping the bottom of the barrel". In 1976, he was made an Honorary Canon of Ely Cathedral.

=== Episcopal ministry ===
On 5 September 1978 it was announced that Booth-Clibborn was to be the next Bishop of Manchester. This was one of the first appointments made by the newly created Crown Appointments Commission. He was consecrated as a bishop in 1979. He helped raise £350,000 towards the production of the Faith in the City report that was published in 1985. On 22 May 1985, he was introduced to the House of Lords as a Lord Spiritual. He was the next most senior diocesan bishop by length of term and so filled the seat of a retiring bishop in the Lords.

In November 1992, Booth-Clibborn stepped down as Bishop of Manchester and retired from full-time ministry.

== Later life ==
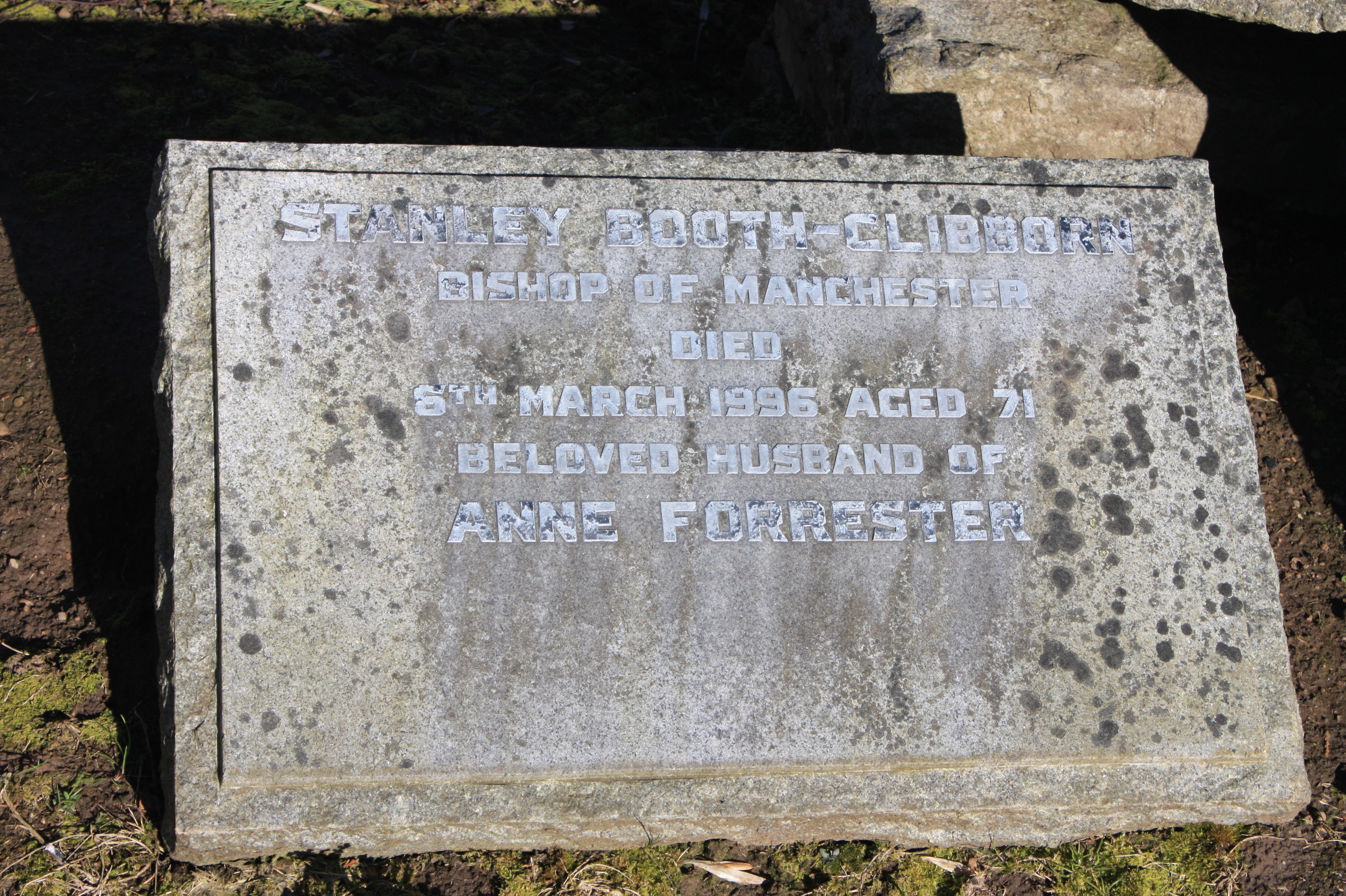
The grave of Bishop Stanley Booth-Clibborn, Morningside Cemetery, Edinburgh

In June 1994, it was reported that while in Uganda Booth-Clibborn had been shot in the leg by attackers who demanded money.

On 6 March 1996, Booth-Clibborn died in Edinburgh, Scotland, at the age 71. He had been suffering from an infection that occurred following a hernia operation. On 12 March, he was cremated following a private funeral. A memorial service was held at Manchester Cathedral on 29 March.

His ashes are buried in a grave in Morningside Cemetery, Edinburgh in the south-west section.

== Family ==
On 15 February 1958, Booth-Clibborn married Anne Forrester. Anne's parents, William and Margaret Forrester, had been distinguished figures in the Church of Scotland. Anne would later become Deputy Chair of the charity Christian Aid. Together, they had four children; two sons and two daughters.

== Views ==
=== Political ===
During his time in Kenya, Booth-Clibborn would preach that the Kenyans had "to be responsible for their own nation", stating on one occasion that "politics is not a dirty business Africans can leave to the British". He also campaigned for the freeing of Jomo Kenyatta and described his importance to Kenya as similar to Gandhi's importance to India.

Booth-Clibborn was a member of the Labour Party. He was regarded as a "dangerous radical" by supporters of the Thatcher government.

During his time as bishop, Booth-Clibborn took an active interest in politics and social policy, and wrote letters to various newspapers. In 1980, he spoke out against the Assisted Places Scheme that would see poor pupils receive state-funded places in private school. In a letter to The Times, he said that "Politicians' task is to improve the state schools where the vast majority of our children are educated. ... Every penny of public money available should be directed to this purpose." On 18 December 1980, he appeared on the BBC's Question Time. In 1987, he wrote a letter to The Independent speaking out against credit cards and accusing financial institutions of "selling debt". In 1988, during a debate about the Local Government Act, he spoke out against Section 28 (which banned the promotion of homosexuality) saying "Many peers should surely be well aware of the dangers of encouraging prejudice". Also in 1988, during a speech in the House of Lords, he described the million-pound salaries of some company chairmen as "obscene" especially when compared to the £5000 paid to a trainee nurse: he stated it is "utterly wrong and misguided thinking to imagine that one can have a nation which is spiritually healthy when one has large numbers of millionaires".

=== Religious ===
Booth-Clibborn trained for the priesthood at a Liberal Anglo-Catholic theological college. In a brief obituary published in The Tablet, a Roman Catholic magazine, he was described as a "noted liberal".

Booth-Clibborn was a supporter of the ordination of women. From 1979 to 1982, he served as the first Moderator of the Movement for the Ordination of Women. His leadership of MOW helped establish it as a national organisation.

== Honours ==
In 1989, Booth-Clibborn was awarded an honorary fellowship by Manchester Polytechnic. He was awarded an honorary Doctor of Divinity degree by the University of Manchester in 1994.

Church of England titles
Preceded by Patrick Rodger	Bishop of Manchester; 1979–1992	Succeeded by Christopher Mayfield
