= Florence Booth =

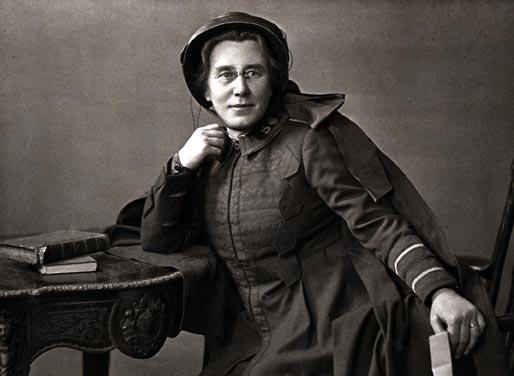
Florence Soper Booth c.1912

Florence Eleanor Booth (née Soper; 12 September 1861 – 10 June 1957) was the wife of Bramwell Booth, Second General of The Salvation Army.

== Early life ==
Born in Blaina, Monmouthshire, she was the eldest daughter of Dr Isabell Hawker Soper, a Plymouth physician, and his wife, Jane Eleanor (née Levick), and had a sister Evelyn Mary and a brother Frederick. Her mother died in 1870 when she was nine years old. She was a gifted girl fond of reading and music and also had a secret ambition to become a doctor.

== The Salvation Army ==
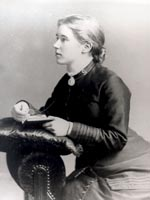
A young Florence Soper in uniform

Florence had just passed her last school examination and was visiting her two aunts in London when she converted at a Whitechapel meeting she had attended as a sightseer. Here she heard Catherine Booth speak and made the decision to follow Christ and learn more about The Salvation Army. She became friendly with the Booth family including their son Bramwell. After making the decision to join the Army, by 1881 she had been promoted to Lieutenant and in that year went with the Booth's eldest daughter Catherine to begin the Salvation Army's work in France. It was at this time that Bramwell asked her to marry him. As she was not yet 21 her father was against the marriage, but finally, on 12 October 1882, Captain Florence Soper married Chief of the Staff Bramwell Booth at Clapton Congress Hall before a crowd of 6,000 Salvationists, who were charged 1 shilling each to attend, the money being used to purchase the notorious "Eagle Tavern" public house. The wedding ceremony was performed by General Booth. In 1912, on the death of his father, Bramwell Booth was to become the second General of The Salvation Army.

== The Women's Social Work ==
Soper with five of her seven children

Life for women in the early 1880s was difficult. Jobs were scarce, and prostitution was rampant. Girls as young as 13 were selling themselves or being sold for money. When Florence Booth, a pioneer of The Salvation Army's social work for women, caught wind of this travesty she knew The Salvation Army needed to do something. She and her husband, Bramwell Booth, were moved as they walked the streets of London and saw the desperation and despair. Florence championed the cause and helped bring social reform.

In 1884 Florence inaugurated The Women's Social Work which was run from a small house known as the Women's Rescue Home in Hanbury Street, in Whitechapel, London.

She was young, delicate, refined; her remarkable powers of grasp and administration had not been developed at this time; she was typical of the well-educated, rather shrinking and self-conscious girl of the English professional classes — perhaps the last person in the world to whom any one would have thought of committing so hazardous and dreadful a business as this rescuing of fallen women. But she was moved by her husband's appeal, and, in spite of some doubt on William Booth's part, was appointed to take charge of the Salvation Army's first Rescue Home.

She continued to lead this pioneering aspect of The Salvation Army's work for the next 28 years, until Bramwell became General.

One of the tangible ways The Salvation Army helped these destitute women was by opening homes for women in the hopes they would not have to turn to prostitution and providing a safe haven for those who were already suffering from the trade. Many of the residents were young, expectant mothers. Realizing the need for additional care for pregnant women, The Salvation Army opened rescue homes across the globe.

== Family life ==
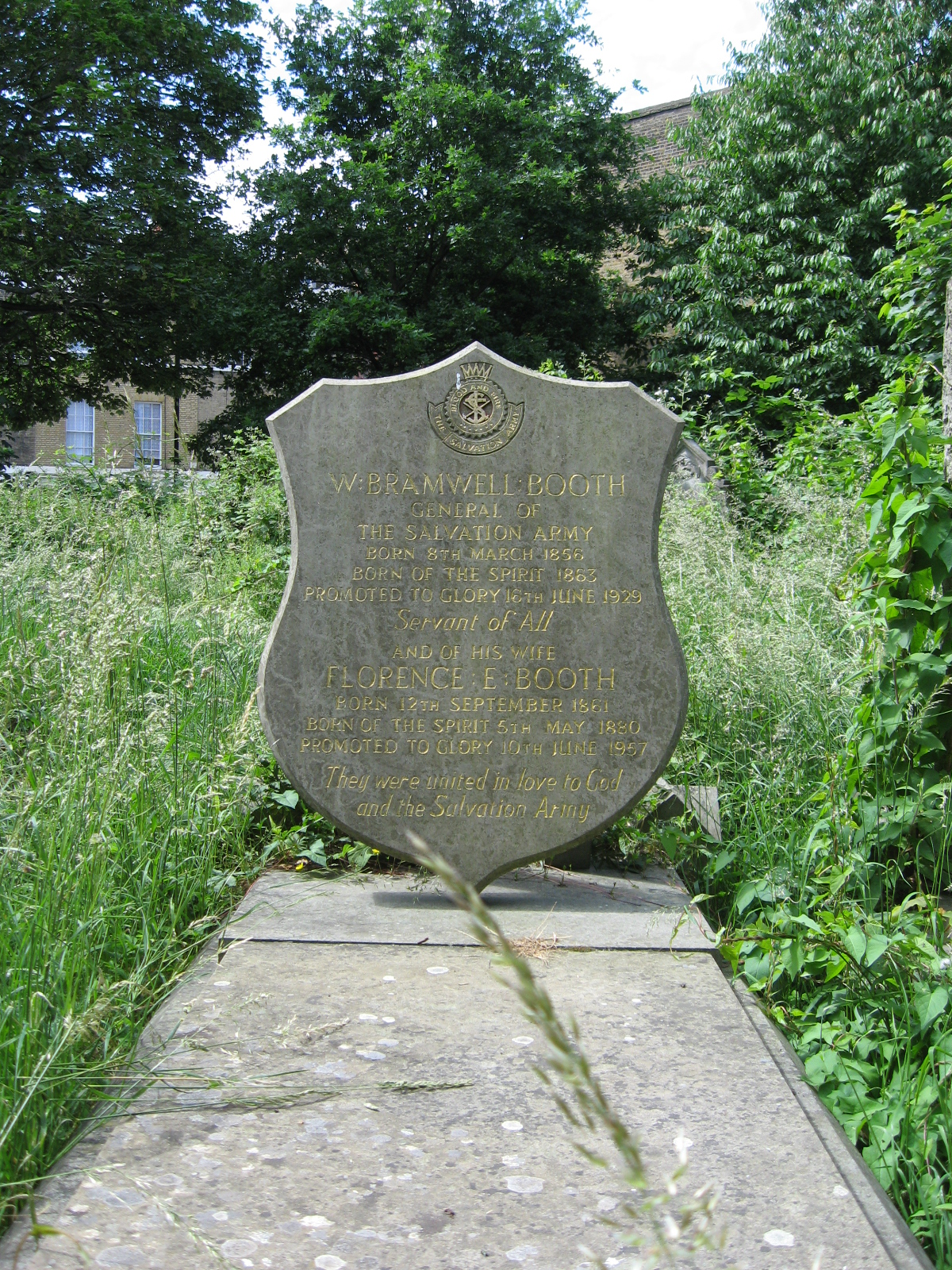
Grave of Florence Booth at Abney Park Cemetery

Florence and Bramwell Booth had five daughters and two sons: Catherine (1883-1987), Mary B. (1885-1969), Florence Miriam (1887-1917), Olive Emma (1891-1989), Dora (1893-1989), Bramwell Bernard (1889-1984) and William Wycliffe (1895-1975).

On her death in 1957, Florence Soper Booth was buried with Bramwell Booth at Abney Park Cemetery.

== Legacy ==
Florence Booth House is a shelter for homeless people in Ontario, Canada
