= T. Henry Howard =

- t-henry-howard.jpg

Commissioner Thomas Henry Howard OF (July 17, 1849 – July 1, 1923) was the Second Chief of the Staff of The Salvation Army, succeeding Bramwell Booth on his appointment as General on the death of his father William Booth in 1912.

== Biography ==
Howard was born on July 17, 1849, in Ilkeston in Derbyshire to Hannah and William Howard. He worked as a builder and spent a night in prayer before making the decision to join The Salvation Army. After a short period spent at the Whitechapel Corps, he was appointed to the work of officer training.

In 1884, he was transferred to Australia, where he was instrumental in expanding the work of the Army, and was the first Commander of The Salvation Army Australia Southern Territory, from 1886 to 1889. Later appointments included British Commissioner, International Training Commissioner and Foreign Secretary at the International Headquarters in London.

Howard was appointed The Salvation Army's Second Chief of Staff by General Bramwell Booth in 1912, a post he held until his retirement from active service in 1919. In 1920, he was awarded the Order of the Founder, the Salvation Army's most prestigious award. Commissioner Howard died in Margate in Kent in 1923.

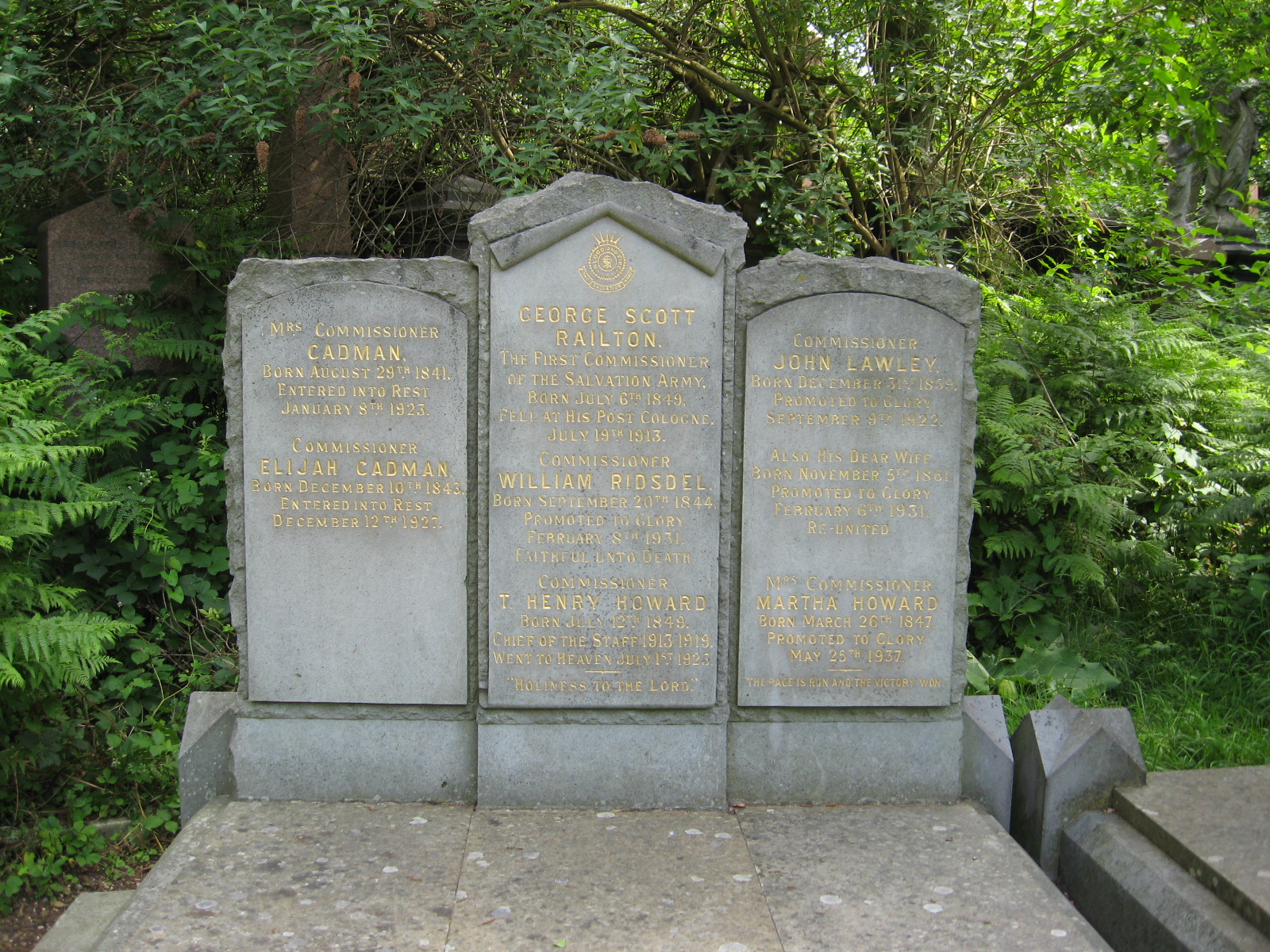
Howard's grave at Abney Park Cemetery

Two of the children he had with his wife Martha (1847-1937) died young. His son John Howard married Florence Annie Lawley, the daughter of Commissioner John Lawley.

He died on July 1, 1923. Like many prominent Salvationists, T. Henry Howard is buried in Abney Park Cemetery.
