= Bramwell Booth =

General of The Salvation Army (1856–1929)

Bramwell Booth CH
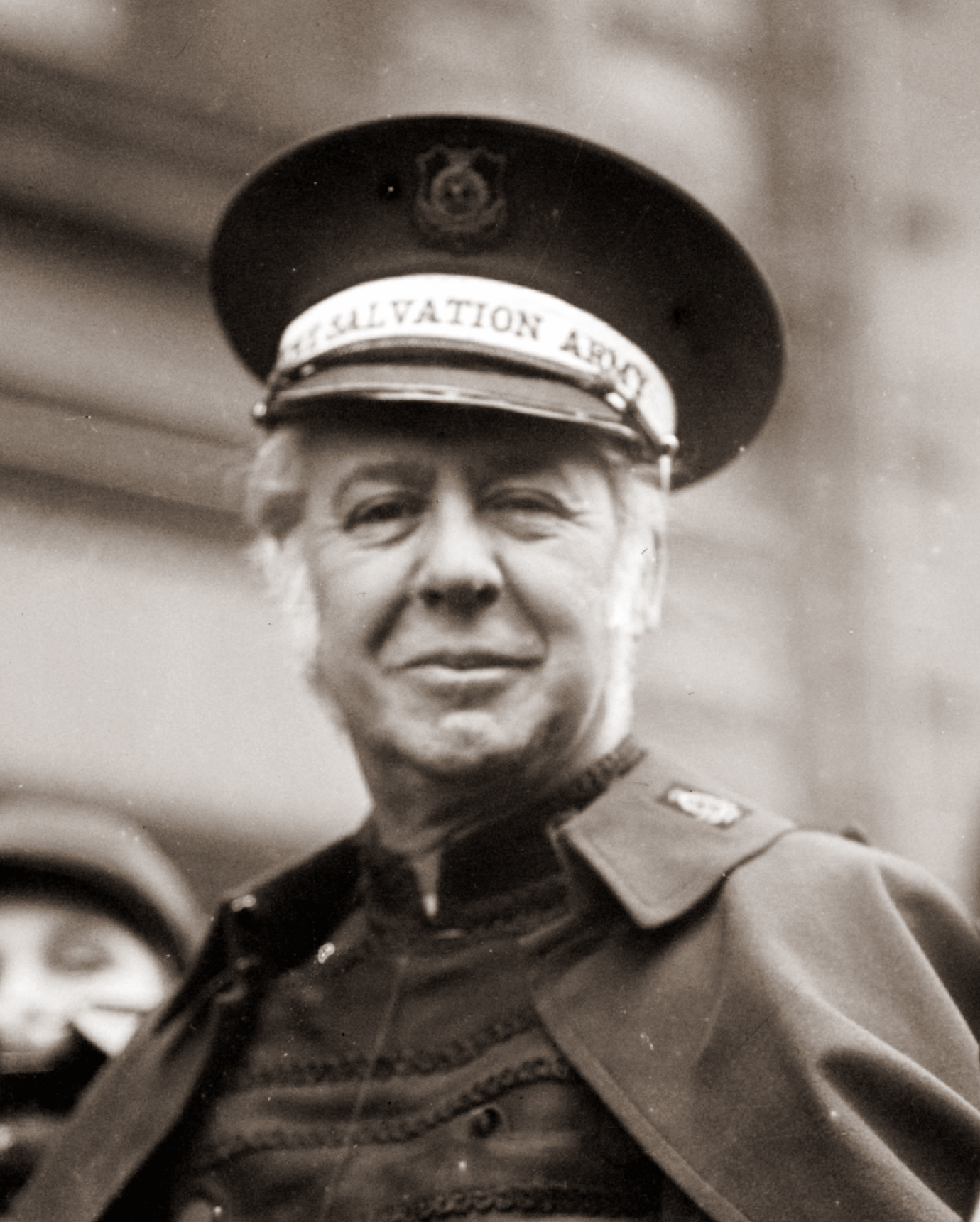
- Booth in about 1910

2nd General of The Salvation Army
- In office 21 August 1912 – 13 February 1929
- Appointed by: William Booth
- Preceded by: William Booth
- Succeeded by: Edward Higgins

1st Chief of the Staff of The Salvation Army
- In office 1881–1912
- General: William Booth
- Preceded by: Office Established
- Succeeded by: T. Henry Howard

Personal details
- Born: 8 March 1856 Halifax, West Riding of Yorkshire
- Died: 16 June 1929 (aged 73) Hertfordshire
- Resting place: Abney Park Cemetery, Stoke Newington, London
- Spouse: Florence Eleanor Soper (m. 1882–1929)
- Parent(s): William Booth; Catherine Mumford

William Bramwell Booth, CH (8 March 1856 – 16 June 1929) was a British church and charity leader who was the first Chief of Staff (1881–1912) and the second General of The Salvation Army (1912–1929), succeeding his father, William Booth.

== Biography ==
Booth was born in Halifax, Yorkshire, England. He was named after William Bramwell, a Methodist revivalist. The oldest child born to William Booth and Catherine Mumford, Bramwell Booth had two brothers and five sisters, including Evangeline Booth, Catherine Booth-Clibborn, Emma Booth and Ballington Booth. The Booth family regularly moved from place to place as William Booth's ministry necessitated until the family finally settled in London in 1865. Bramwell Booth was involved in The Salvation Army right from its origins as the obscure Christian Mission, established in Whitechapel in 1865, into an international organisation with numerous and varied social activities. He was educated at home, briefly at a preparatory school and at the City of London School, where he was bullied.

Known to his family as 'Willie', as a youth he suffered poor health and had a slight hearing loss. In 1870, aged just 14, Bramwell Booth started to help in the management of his father's Christian Mission and in the cheap food kitchens set up in its early days. He had intended to study medicine and had a fear of public speaking, but despite these obstacles he became William Booth's amanuensis, adviser and administrator. He became an active full-time collaborator with his father in 1874, and an officer when the Christian Mission became The Salvation Army in 1878.

The name The Salvation Army developed from an incident in May 1878. William Booth was dictating a letter to his secretary George Scott Railton and said, "We are a volunteer army." Bramwell Booth heard his father and said, "Volunteer? I'm no volunteer, I'm a regular!" Railton was instructed to cross out the word "volunteer" and substitute the word "salvation".

== Chief of the staff ==
Bramwell Booth as Chief of the Staff

In 1881, General William Booth appointed Bramwell as his Chief of the Staff of The Salvation Army. Bramwell would hold this title until his father's death, when he himself was named General in his father's will. In 1885 Bramwell was involved with William Thomas Stead in an attempt to publicise the prostitution of young girls. The lurid revelations of how thirteen-year-old Eliza Armstrong was sold for £5 resulted in the 1885 Criminal Law Amendment Act, which raised the age of consent to sixteen years. After the revelations, Booth, Stead, and Rebecca Jarrett, a converted brothel-keeper who assisted them, were arrested on several charges. Booth was acquitted but the others served short prison terms.

On 12 October 1882 Bramwell married Captain Florence Eleanor Soper, the eldest daughter of Dr Soper, a medical practitioner of Blaina, Monmouthshire. The congregation at Clapton Congress Hall were charged one shilling each for admission to the ceremony. She had joined The Salvation Army in 1880 and worked in France with Bramwell's sister Catherine Booth. After her marriage she took charge of the women's social work. All of their seven children (five daughters and two sons) became active workers in the army. Their eldest child was Commissioner Catherine Bramwell-Booth.

== General of The Salvation Army ==
Upon his death in 1912, William Booth appointed Bramwell his successor as General, by way of a sealed envelope. This process was the legal way in which a successor to the General was chosen, as outlined by the Christian Mission's founding deed of 1878. Like his father, Bramwell Booth ruled autocratically, and expected complete obedience. However, what officers had tolerated from William Booth, by then known as 'The Founder', they would not tolerate from Bramwell.

The early years of Bramwell Booth's Generalship were complicated by World War I, which threatened the international nature of The Salvation Army, with Salvationists in both Germany and Great Britain. However, he was able to steer a course that offended neither the Germans nor outraged British public opinion, saying in his Christmas message of 1915, "Every land is my fatherland, for all lands are my Father's.".

Like his father before him, Bramwell would not tolerate any perceived insubordination and he summarily retired Salvation Army officers with little reason or sent officers too young to be retired to distant appointments; such officers were said to be in 'the freezer'. Bramwell faced allegations of nepotism, in that he appointed his own children to posts for which others were better qualified. This system could be seen as being inherited from his father, who similarly appointed his own children to high ranking positions. This led to accusations that The Salvation Army was a Booth family-business; however, William Booth had once said to his children that "The Salvation Army does not belong to you, or to me, it belongs to the world" and was very wary of the leadership of the Army becoming a dynasty.

Discontent simmered among Salvation Army senior officers, including the chief-of-the-staff Edward Higgins and George Carpenter, who incidentally had been sent to 'the freezer' by his appointment to Sydney in a role he previously held 22 years earlier. These two officers later became Generals of The Salvation Army. As a result of the affair, Higgins and Carpenter became somewhat distant from Booth. Another notable Army leader that disagreed with Bramwell's leadership was Commissioner Charles Jeffries who would later be British Commissioner. In his final years as General he increasingly gave control of The Salvation Army to his wife, Florence Booth, who was given power of attorney when he was away travelling. She had been the Army's 'First Lady' since the death of his mother Catherine Booth in 1890, and had started several Army organisations including the Home League, Girl Guards, and League of Mercy.

As the years passed the Army's senior officers, including Bramwell's sister Evangeline Booth and his former brother-in-law Frederick Booth-Tucker, began to question his leadership. In May 1928 Bramwell's health began to deteriorate, and by September he was suffering from insomnia and depression. His poor health offered those in the Army who were dissatisfied with his leadership an opportunity to act, and on 8 January 1929 the first High Council of The Salvation Army convened, and firstly asked the General to resign due to his ill health, which, they said, was hampering him in the performance of his duties and decisions. He refused to resign, believing that his health would soon be fully recovered, so on 13 February 1929 the High Council voted by 52 votes to 5 that Bramwell's term of office as General should now end, based on Bramwell being 'unfit' to hold the position. Booth was succeeded in the election of Edward Higgins, his Chief of the Staff.

Bramwell Booth visites The Hague in 1925 and speaks to the gathered crowd at his arrival (no audio)

General Bramwell Booth then took the High Council to court, which lost him a lot of respect; he also lost the court case. His sister, Evangeline Booth later succeeded General Higgins to serve as the fourth General of The Salvation Army. Henceforth the General of The Salvation Army would be elected by the High Council.

On 29 April 1929 the now former General Bramwell Booth received a letter from Prime Minister Stanley Baldwin stating that King George V had appointed him a member of the Order of the Companions of Honour.

== Vegetarianism ==
Booth, like his parents William and Catherine and his wife Florence, was vegetarian. He authored the booklet The Advantages of Vegetarian Diet, published by the London Vegetarian Society. In 1925, it was reprinted by the Order of the Golden Age. Booth suggested nineteen reasons for adopting vegetarianism. He commented that a vegetarian diet is "favourable to purity, chastity, and a perfect control of the appetites and passions."

Booth's wife also became a vegetarian and they both believed that meat stimulated the consumption of alcohol.

== Death ==
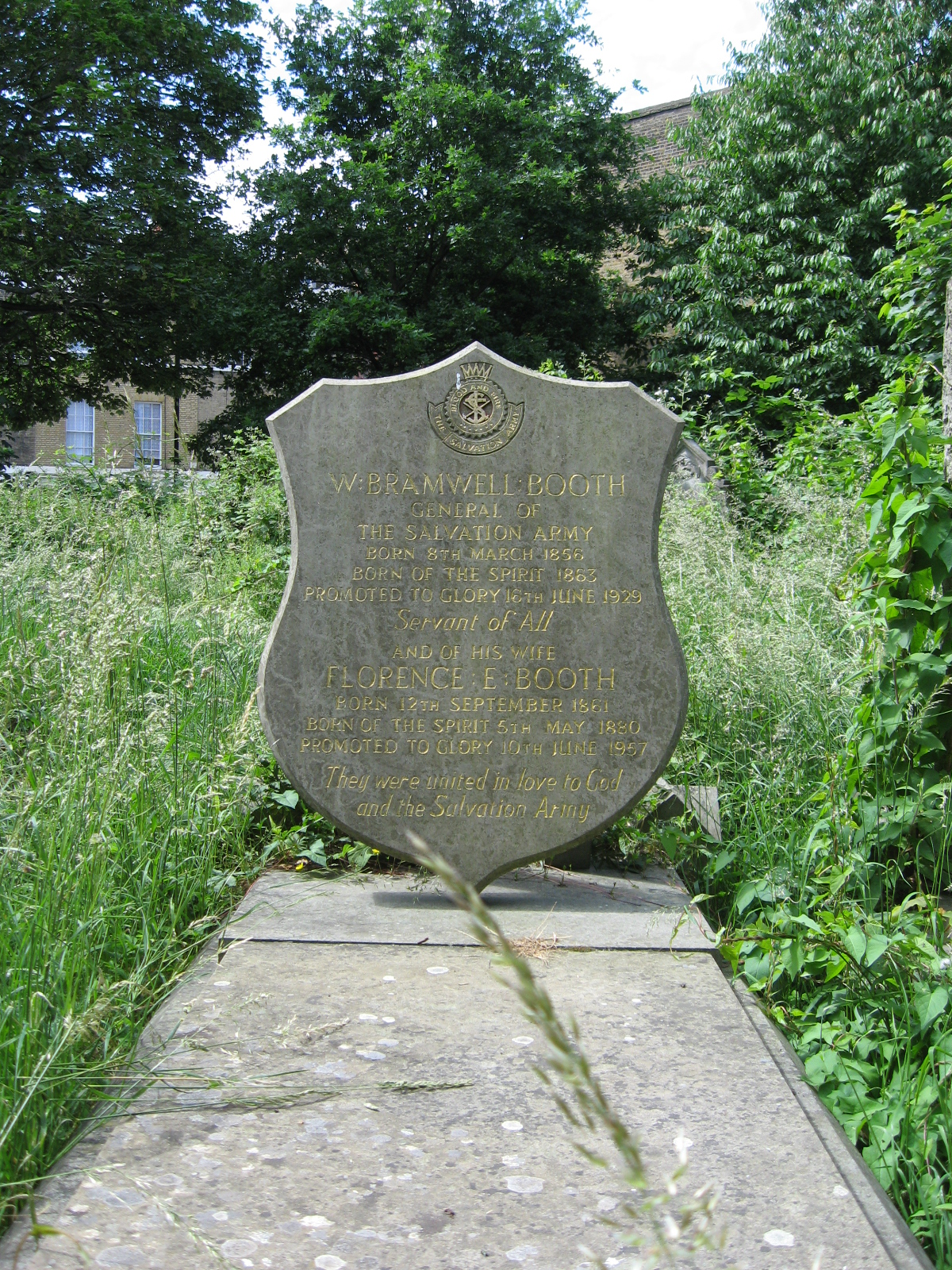
Grave of Bramwell Booth at Abney Park Cemetery

On 16 June 1929 his family was summoned to his bedside, and on that Sunday evening General Bramwell Booth died at his home, The Homestead, Hadley Wood, near Barnet, Hertfordshire. For the Friday and Saturday following his death Bramwell Booth's body lay in state at The Salvation Army's Congress Hall. On the Saturday evening 10,000 Salvationists and friends filled the Royal Albert Hall to bid farewell to their beloved former General.

General Bramwell Booth was buried opposite his parents at Abney Park Cemetery, Stoke Newington, London. The grave lies near the southern entrance. Huge crowds attended his funeral. He was commemorated by the Bramwell Booth Memorial Hall, Queen Victoria Street, London.

== Notes ==
Preceded by William Booth	General of The Salvation Army; 1912–1929	Succeeded by Edward Higgins
