= Evangeline Booth =

British General of the Salvation Army (1865–1950)

General Evangeline Booth OF
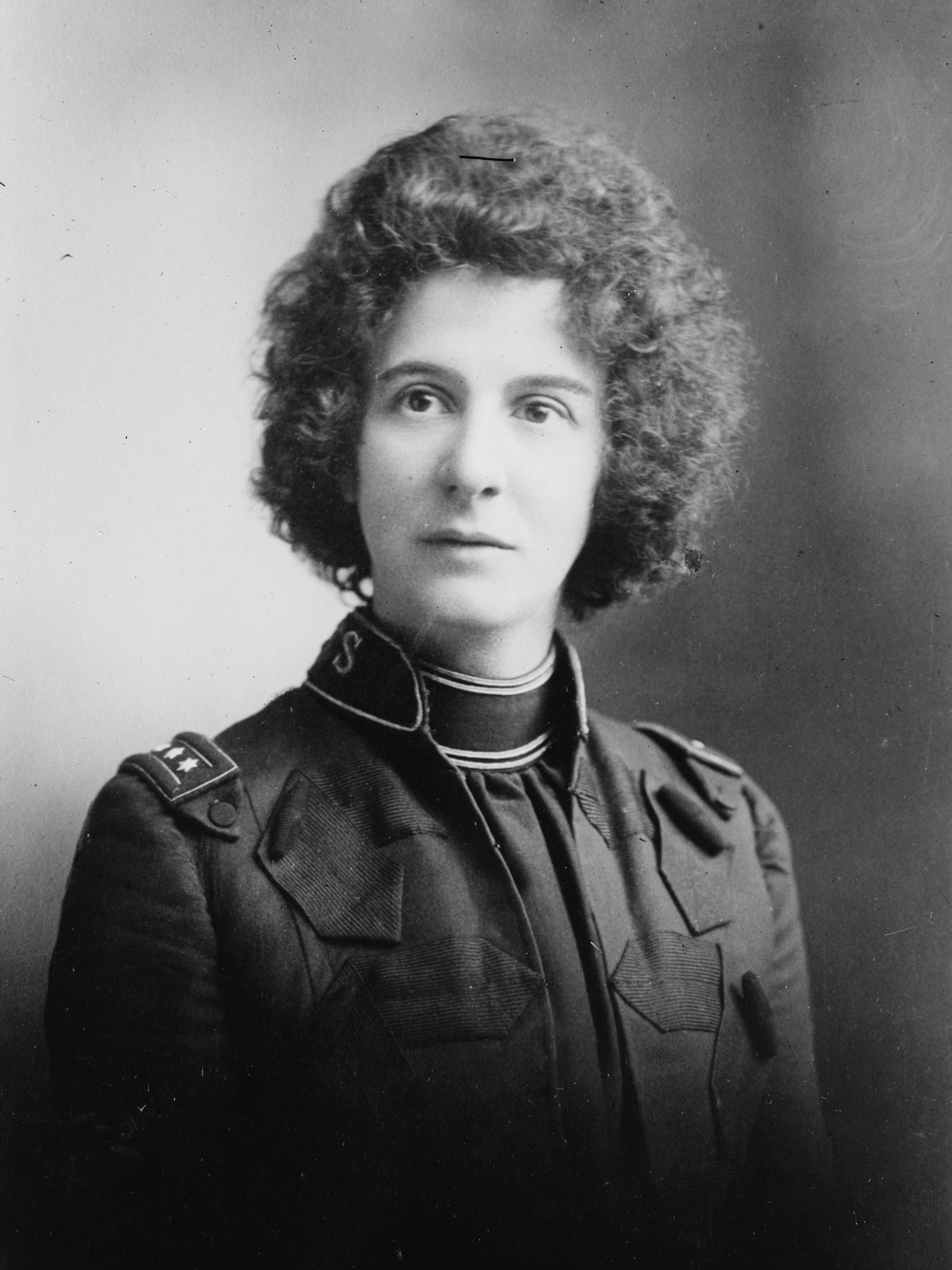
- Booth in 1907

4th General of The Salvation Army
- In office 11 November 1934 – 1 November 1939
- Preceded by: Edward Higgins
- Succeeded by: George Carpenter

Personal details
- Born: Evelyne Cory Booth; December 25, 1865 South Hackney, London, England
- Died: 17 July 1950 (aged 84) Hartsdale, New York, United States
- Parent(s): William Booth; Catherine Mumford

Evangeline Cory Booth OF (December 25, 1865 – July 17, 1950) was a British evangelist and the fourth General of The Salvation Army from 1934 to 1939; she was the first woman to hold the post.

== Early life ==
She was born in South Hackney, London, England, the seventh of eight children born to William Booth and Catherine Mumford. Earlier the same year, William and Catherine had founded The Christian Mission, which became The Salvation Army in 1878. Catherine Booth had recently read Uncle Tom's Cabin and wanted to name her baby 'Evangeline', but William Booth did not like the name and wrote 'Evelyne' on the birth certificate. Years later, while in the United States, Evelyne would be persuaded by Frances Willard, founder of the Woman's Christian Temperance Union, to adopt the name 'Evangeline' as being more dignified and more befitting the commander of The Salvation Army in America.

At 15 she was a Sergeant selling the Army's paper The War Cry in the slums of east London. In 1887, at 21 years of age, she became the officer of the corps in Marylebone, where there was very strong opposition to The Salvation Army. Wherever trouble threatened, General Booth's solution was invariably the same, 'Send Eva!'.

== The Salvation Army ==
Booth was appointed as Field Commissioner throughout Great Britain from 1888 to 1891, courageously facing riotous crowds. From 1891 until 1896 she was in charge of Officer Training. When in 1896 an American break-away group led by her brother Ballington Booth and his wife Maud Ballington Booth attempted to tempt American Salvationists away from The Salvation Army and into a rival group called Volunteers of America, General Booth sent Evangeline to New York. When she arrived the doors to Army headquarters on 14th Street had been locked against her. However, "she mounted the fire escape and climbed through a rear window. The dissidents hissed and booed until she literally wrapped herself in an available American flag and challenged: "Hiss that, if you dare." In the stunned silence she played her concertina and sang "Over Jordan without Fearing." Ballington's rebellion was quelled."

She was appointed temporary Territorial Commander of the United States, then Territorial Commander of Canada. In 1904 she returned as Commander of the United States, and held this position until 1934. In the aftermath of the 1906 San Francisco earthquake, she led a mass meeting in Union Square, New York, and raised over $12,000 for Salvation Army relief work among the victims of the disaster. During this period she became a US citizen.

In August 1917, despite the differences between Commander Evangeline Booth and US General Pershing, commander of the American Expeditionary Force (AEF), the first of 250 Salvationists left New York for the front line of the Great War in France. They soon won the confidence of the troops with their cheerful brand of 'seven-days-a-week' Christianity. As tributes poured in, Evangeline protested: 'The Salvation Army has had no new success; we have only done an old thing in an old way.' The American people disagreed, and subscribed an unprecedented $13 million to clear debts incurred by The Army, through its provision of canteens, hostels, rest rooms during the war, and afterwards on the provision of care and accommodation for the returning forces. For her work in support of the AEF, Booth was awarded the Distinguished Service Medal by the U.S. Army. Booth was one of only a very few civilian women to be so honored for service during the First World War.

In 1926, Booth recounted a story in which her dog "Mazie" saved her life by fetching others in her household to give her mouth-to-mouth resuscitation. In 1927, Booth visited her brother, General Bramwell Booth, with a memorandum which set to change the way in which The Salvation Army appointed its General. At first Bramwell refused to speak with Evangeline and forced communication through his speech writer, Commissioner Cornelius Obadiah Phelps. After finally agreeing to meet, Bramwell was not convinced; he was adamant that he would appoint his successor as his father had done before him.

In January 1929, the first High Council of The Salvation Army decided otherwise, and since then the General has been elected by the High Council, in line with Evangeline Booth's original proposal.

== Fourth General ==
Evangeline Booth was elected General by the second High Council in 1934. She brought to the Generalship experience in many areas of The Army's work but never lost the zeal and enthusiasm of the early years. Dubbed 'The Musician General' by Army papers of the time, she took great interest in the soul-winning activities of the musical sections of The Salvation Army.

Like her father, the Founder, Booth extensively travelled the world. After her election as General she toured Great Britain, and in 1935 India, Ceylon, Australia, New Zealand, Hawaii and the United States; then, immediately upon her return, Norway and Sweden. By the end of 1935 she undertook a 'motorcade' - the entire East Coast of England up to Darlington, then several Western Counties and the Thames Valley. The following year she went on another motorcade from Land's End to John o' Groats, and visited Canada, the United States and France, though by this time she was over seventy years old.

The Salvation Army's work greatly prospered during Evangeline Booth's leadership, with Salvation Army activities being commenced in Singapore, Algeria, Egypt, French Equatorial Africa, the Philippines, Mexico, and Penang (Malaya).

== Later years ==
Her term of office ended on October 31, 1939, when Commissioner George Lyndon Carpenter was elected as the Army's fifth General. Towards the end of November, Evangeline left Britain for her home in up-state New York, and spent the remaining years of her life there.

She wrote several books, including Toward a Better World and Songs of the Evangel. The Salvation Army Evangeline Booth College in Atlanta, Georgia is named after her, as is 'The Evangeline Booth Lodge' in Chicago which is "a haven for families and individuals suddenly homeless because of eviction, disasters such as a fire or flood, loss of utilities, domestic violence, being stranded while traveling, or other crises."

General Evangeline Booth lived in Hartsdale, New York, until her death at the age of 84 from arteriosclerosis. She is interred in Kensico Cemetery, Valhalla, Mount Pleasant, New York near White Plains, New York. Her home, the Evangeline Booth House, now known as St. Andrew's Episcopal Church, was added to the National Register of Historic Places in 2011.

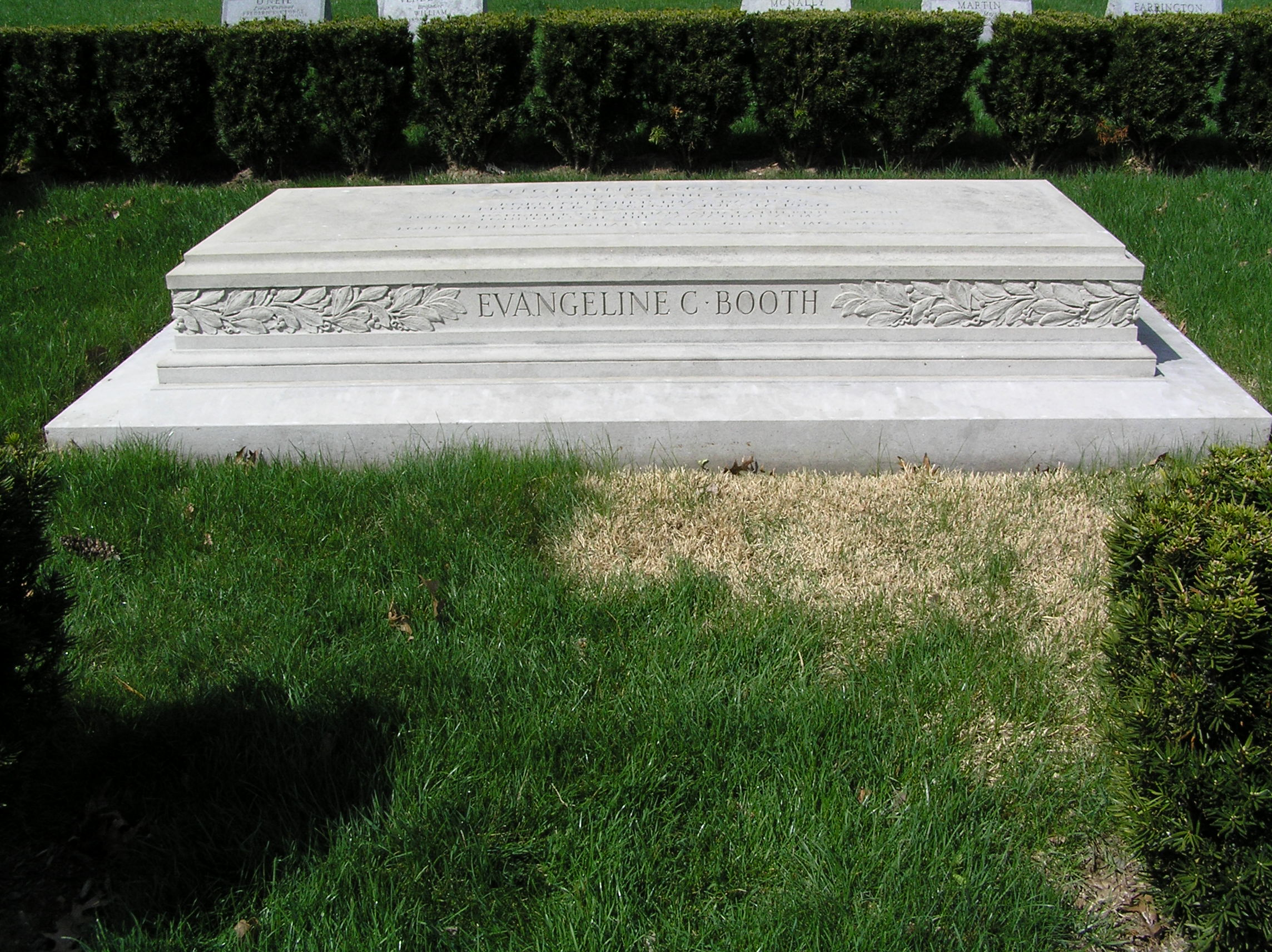
The monument of Evangeline C. Booth

== Family ==
Booth did not marry, but adopted four children.

Preceded by Edward Higgins	General of The Salvation Army; 1934–1939	Succeeded by George Carpenter
