= Salvation Army =

Christian denomination and charity

- Classification: Protestant
- Orientation: Methodist
- Scripture: Protestant Bible
- Theology: Wesleyan-Holiness
- Structure: Military rank–based chain of command
- General: Lyndon Buckingham
- Associations: National Association of Evangelicals Wesleyan Holiness Connection Christian Churches Together
- Region: Worldwide
- Headquarters: IHQ, London, EC4V; United Kingdom
- Founder: William Booth; Catherine Booth
- Origin: 2 July 1865; 161 years ago London
- Separated from: Methodism
- Separations: American Rescue Workers (1882); Associated Gospel Churches (1892); Volunteers of America (1896)
- Congregations: 15,409
- Members: 1.65 million
- Ministers: 26,359
- Other name: East London Christian Mission (formerly)
- Official website: salvationarmy.org

The Salvation Army is a Methodist Christian church and an international charitable organisation aligned with the Wesleyan-Holiness movement. It was founded and headquartered in London, England. The organisation reports a worldwide membership of over 1.7 million Salvationists, consisting of "soldiers", officers, and adherents who are collectively known as salvationists. Its founders sought to bring salvation to the poor, destitute, and hungry by meeting both their "physical and spiritual needs". It says it has an official presence in 133 countries, running charity shops, operating shelters for the homeless, and disaster relief and humanitarian aid to developing countries.

The theology of the Salvation Army derives from Methodism, although it differs from other Methodist denominations in institution and practice; an example is that the Salvation Army does not observe sacraments. As with other evangelical denominations in the Holiness Methodist tradition, the Salvation Army lays emphasis on the New Birth (referred to as the first work of grace) and entire sanctification (second work of grace). A distinctive characteristic of the Salvation Army is its use of titles derived from military ranks, such as "lieutenant" or "major". The Army's doctrine is aligned with the Wesleyan–Arminian tradition, particularly the holiness movement. The Army's stated purposes are "the advancement of the Christian religion... of education, the relief of poverty, and other charitable objects beneficial to society or the community of mankind as a whole".

The Salvation Army was founded in 1865 as the "East London Christian Mission" in London by Methodist preacher William Booth and his wife Catherine. It can trace its origins to the Blind Beggar Tavern. In 1878, Booth reorganised the mission, becoming its first "general" and introducing the pseudo-military structure, which it has retained as a matter of tradition. The Salvation Army's highest priority is its Christian principles. As of 2023 the international leader and chief executive officer (CEO) of the Salvation Army is General Lyndon Buckingham.

The Salvation Army is the largest non-government provider of social services in the United States and one of the largest in the world, with expenditures including operating costs of US$3.6 billion in 2022, assisting more than 32 million people in the U.S. alone. In addition to funding feeding centres, homeless shelters, drug rehabilitation centres, community centres, and disaster relief, the organisation also establishes refugee camps, especially among displaced people in Africa. In the United Kingdom, the Salvation Army is no longer the largest non-governmental provider of social services; it still provides a significant service to people in need. The Salvation Army is the sixth largest charity in the United States, with a total revenue of $4.78 billion in 2024. It is a member of many national interdenominational groups, including the American organisation Christian Churches Together.

== History ==
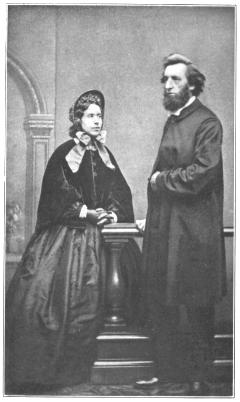
The Salvation Army founders, Catherine Booth and William Booth

The Salvation Army was founded in London's East End in 1865 by one-time Methodist Reform Church minister William Booth and his wife Catherine Booth as the East London Christian Mission, and this name was used until 1878. The name "The Salvation Army" developed from an incident on 19 and 20 May 1878. William Booth was dictating a letter to his secretary George Scott Railton and said, "We are a volunteer army." Bramwell Booth heard his father and said, "Volunteer! I'm no volunteer, I'm a regular!" Railton was instructed to cross out the word "volunteer" and substitute the word "salvation". The Salvation Army was modelled after the military, with its own flag (or colours) and its own hymns, often with words set to popular and folkloric tunes sung in the pubs. Booth and the other soldiers in "God's Army" would wear the Army's own uniform for meetings and ministry work. He became the "General" and his other ministers were given appropriate ranks as "officers". Other members became "soldiers".

George Scott Railton – first Commissioner of the Salvation Army

When William Booth became known as the General, Catherine was known as the "Mother of The Salvation Army". William was motivated to convert poor Londoners such as prostitutes, gamblers, and alcoholics to Christianity, while Catherine spoke to wealthier people, gaining financial support for their work. She also acted as a religious minister, which was unusual at the time. The Foundation Deed of the Christian Mission states that women had the same rights to preach as men. William Booth described the organisation's approach: "The three 'S's' best expressed the way in which the Army administered to the 'down and outs': first, soup; second, soap; and finally, salvation."

In 1880, the Salvation Army started work in three other countries: Australia, Ireland, and the United States. Salvationists set out for the U.S. in 1880. George Scott Railton and his team started work in Harry Hill's Variety Theatre on 14 March 1880. The first notable convert was Ashbarrel Jimmie who had so many convictions for drunkenness that the judge sentenced him to attend the Salvation Army. The corps in New York were founded as a result of Jimmys' rehabilitation. It was not always an Officer of The Salvation Army who started the Salvation Army in a new country; sometimes Salvationists emigrated to countries and started operating as "the Salvation Army" on their own authority. When the first official officers arrived in Australia and the United States, they found groups of Salvationists already waiting for them and started working with each other. The Army's organised social work began in Australia on 8 December 1883 with the establishment of a home for ex-convicts. The Army encouraged emigration from 1885, and continued the work until the 1980s; its own resources describe it as the "largest voluntary migration society in the first half of the twentieth century, helping around 250 000 people to emigrate from the British Isles to the British Empire Dominions".

In 1891, William Booth established a farm colony in Hadleigh, Essex, which allowed people to escape the overcrowded slums in London's East End. A fully working farm with its own market-gardens, orchards, and milk production, it provided training in basic building trades and household work.

The Salvation Army's main converts were at first alcoholics, morphine addicts, prostitutes, and other "undesirables" unwelcome in polite Christian society, which helped prompt the Booths to start their own church. The Booths did not include the use of sacraments (mainly baptism and Holy Communion) in the Army's form of worship, believing that many Christians had come to rely on the outward signs of spiritual grace rather than on grace itself. Other beliefs are that its members should completely refrain from drinking alcohol (Holy Communion is not practised), smoking, taking illegal drugs, and gambling.

As the Salvation Army grew rapidly in the late 19th century, it generated opposition in England. Opponents, grouped under the name of the Skeleton Army, disrupted Salvation Army meetings and gatherings with tactics such as throwing rocks, bones, rats, and tar and physical assaults on members of the Salvation Army. Much of this was led by pub owners who were losing business because of the Army's opposition to alcohol and its targeting of the frequenters of saloons and public houses.

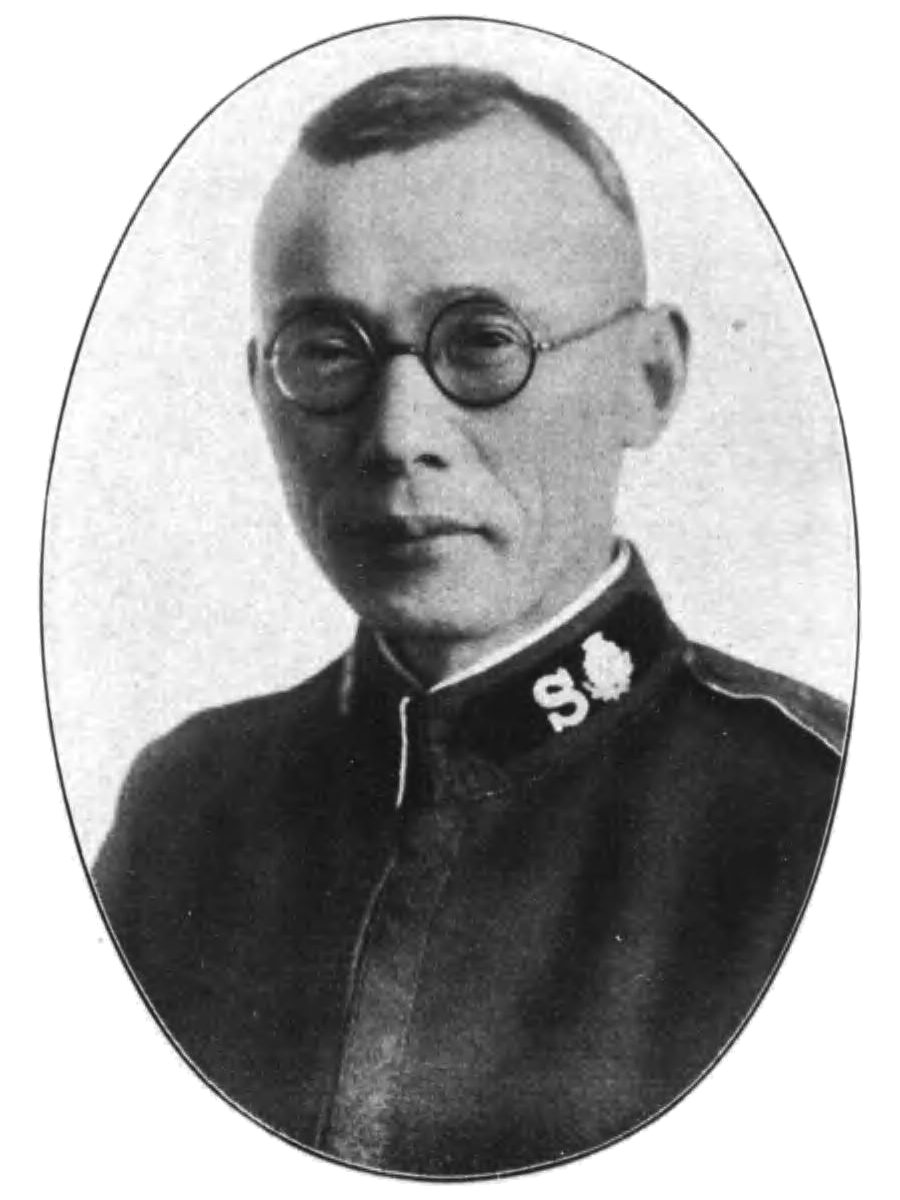
Gunpei Yamamuro, the first Japanese officer in the Salvation Army

In 1882, the Salvation Army was established in Asia with the first outpost in India.

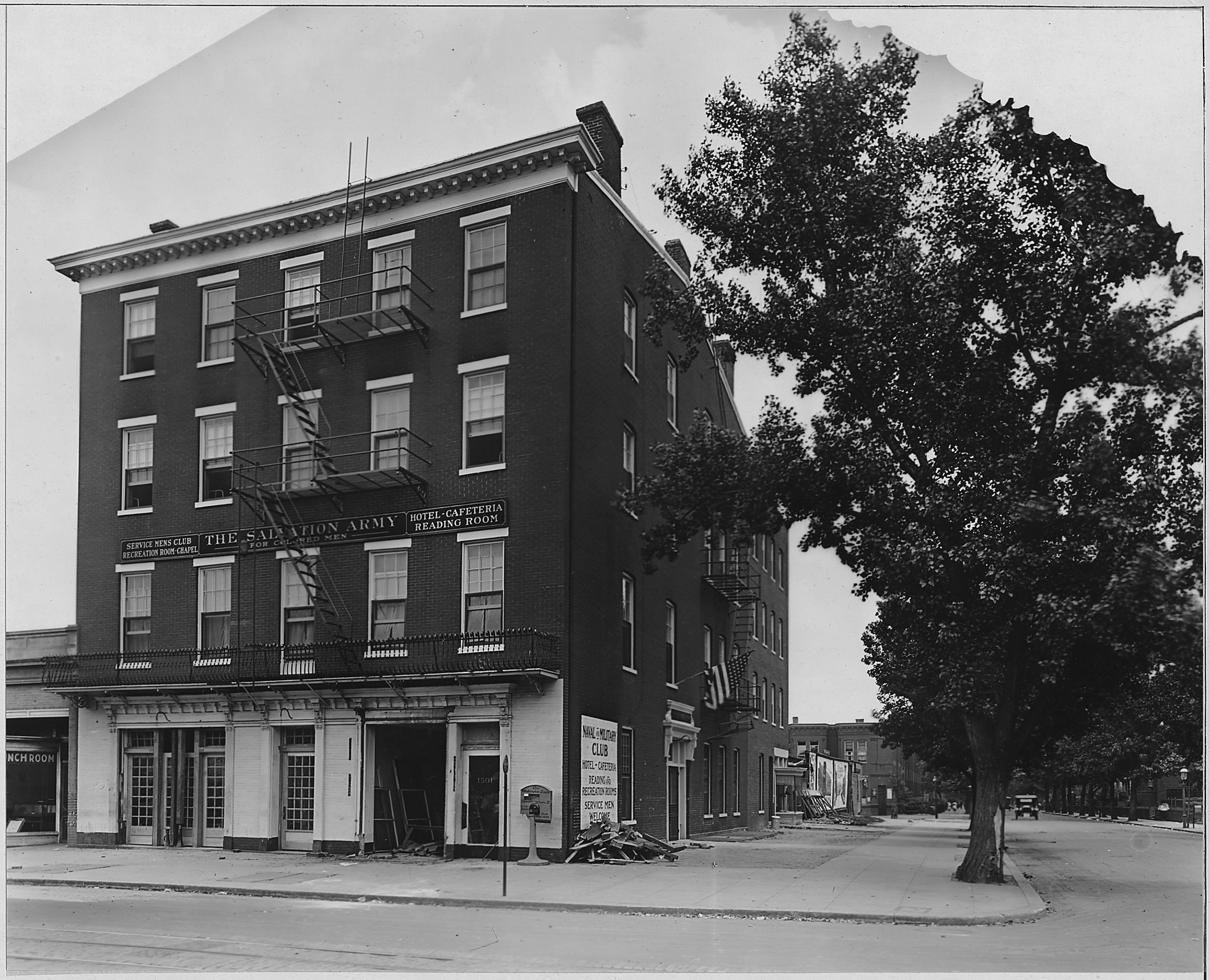
Hotel and cafeteria for coloured men operated by The Salvation Army, Washington, D.C. circa 1917

Today, in the U.S. alone, over 25,000 volunteer bell ringers with red kettles are stationed near retail stores during the weeks preceding Christmas for fundraising.

The Salvation Army was one of the original six organisations that made up the USO, along with the YMCA, YWCA, National Catholic Community Services, National Jewish Welfare Board, and National Travelers Aid Association.

National Salvation Army week was created by President Dwight D. Eisenhower on 24 November 1954, encouraging people to honour the Salvation Army for its work in the United States throughout the past seventy-five years.

=== History of Doughnut Day ===
In 1917, over 250 Salvation Army volunteers went to soldiers' camps in France during World War I to provide supplies and baked goods, including doughnuts, to soldiers. The women who served doughnuts to the troops fried them in soldiers' helmets. They were known as "Doughnut Lassies" and are credited with popularising doughnuts in the United States. National Doughnut Day is now celebrated in the United States on the first Friday of June every year, a tradition that started in Chicago in 1938, to honour those who served doughnuts to soldiers during World War I.

=== Salvation Navy ===
In 1911, New York City architect Bradford Gilbert donated a yacht, The Jerry McAuley, to the Salvation Army. Jerry McAuley was a reformed criminal who founded the McAuley Water Street Mission (now the New York City Rescue Mission) in Lower Manhattan; he was also Mrs. Gilbert's first husband. This 35-foot powerboat with two cabins was the first vessel in the Salvation Navy in America; there were already two or three such vessels in Scandinavia. Its purpose is "to cruise the Atlantic coast, north in the summer and south in the winter, doing missionary work among the seamen of the ports." There was a six person crew; the captain was evangelist Major Nils Erikson.

=== Safeguarding Work ===
The involvement of the Salvation Army in work to combat slavery and human trafficking can be traced back to William Booth publishing a letter in The War Cry in 1885. In the same year an escapee from a prostitution house arrived at the door of the Salvation Army headquarters and sought help from Bramwell Booth.

An early precursor to the Salvation Army becoming involved in safeguarding work was Catherine Booth writing to Queen Victoria regarding a Parliamentary bill for the protection of girls. Safeguarding legislation was strengthened by a new act of Parliament, the "Public General Act, an Act to make further provision for the protection of women and girls, the suppression of brothels, and other purposes, (otherwise known as the Criminal Law Amendment Act 1885)", which received Royal Assent on 14 August 1885 The Salvation Army was involved in getting this Act passed. Its work included a petition (numbering 340,000 signatures, deposited on the floor of the House of Commons by eight uniformed Salvationists), mass meetings, and an investigation into child prostitution. W.T. Stead of The Pall Mall Gazette launched a campaign in 1885 by writing articles on The Maiden Tribute of Modern Babylon to expose the extent of child prostitution, which involved procuring a girl, Eliza, for £5.

The newly founded Salvation Army in Japan also encountered child prostitution, derived from a system of debt bondage. An imperial ordinance (written in classical Japanese that few could understand) declared the girls' right to freedom; the pioneer Salvationist Gunpei Yamamuro rewrote it in colloquial speech.

== Ministers ==
The Salvation Army refers to its ministers as "officers". When they are acting in their official capacities, they can often be recognised by the colour-coded epaulettes on their white uniform dress shirts. The epaulettes have the letter "S" embroidered on them in white. Officer ranks include lieutenant, captain, major, lieutenant colonel, colonel, commissioner, and general. Promotion in rank from lieutenant to major depends primarily on years of service.

Officers are given "marching orders" to change ministries within the Salvation Army. Usually, officers are given new marching orders every two to five years and reassigned to different posts, sometimes moving great distances.

The Salvation Army permits the ordination of women. Salvation Army officers were previously allowed to marry only other officers (this rule varied in different countries); but this rule has been relaxed in recent years. Husbands and wives usually share the same rank and have the same or similar assignments. Such officer-couples are assigned together to act as co-pastors and to administer corps (churches), Adult Rehabilitation Centres, and such.

== Facilities ==
=== Churches ===
The Army has churches throughout the world, known as Salvation Army corps. These serve as churches and community centres. Traditionally, many corps buildings are also called temples or citadels. They also sometimes have youth nights once a week.

=== Charity Shops ===
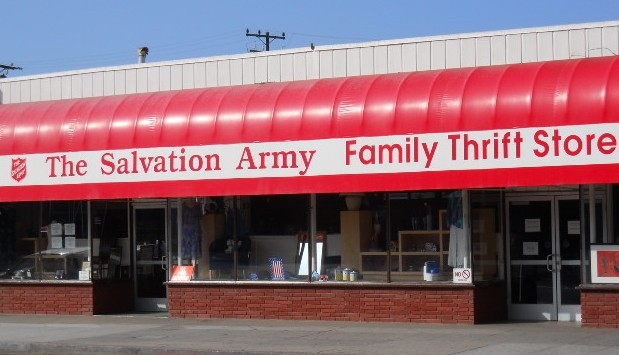
The Salvation Army Family Thrift Store in Santa Monica, California, United States

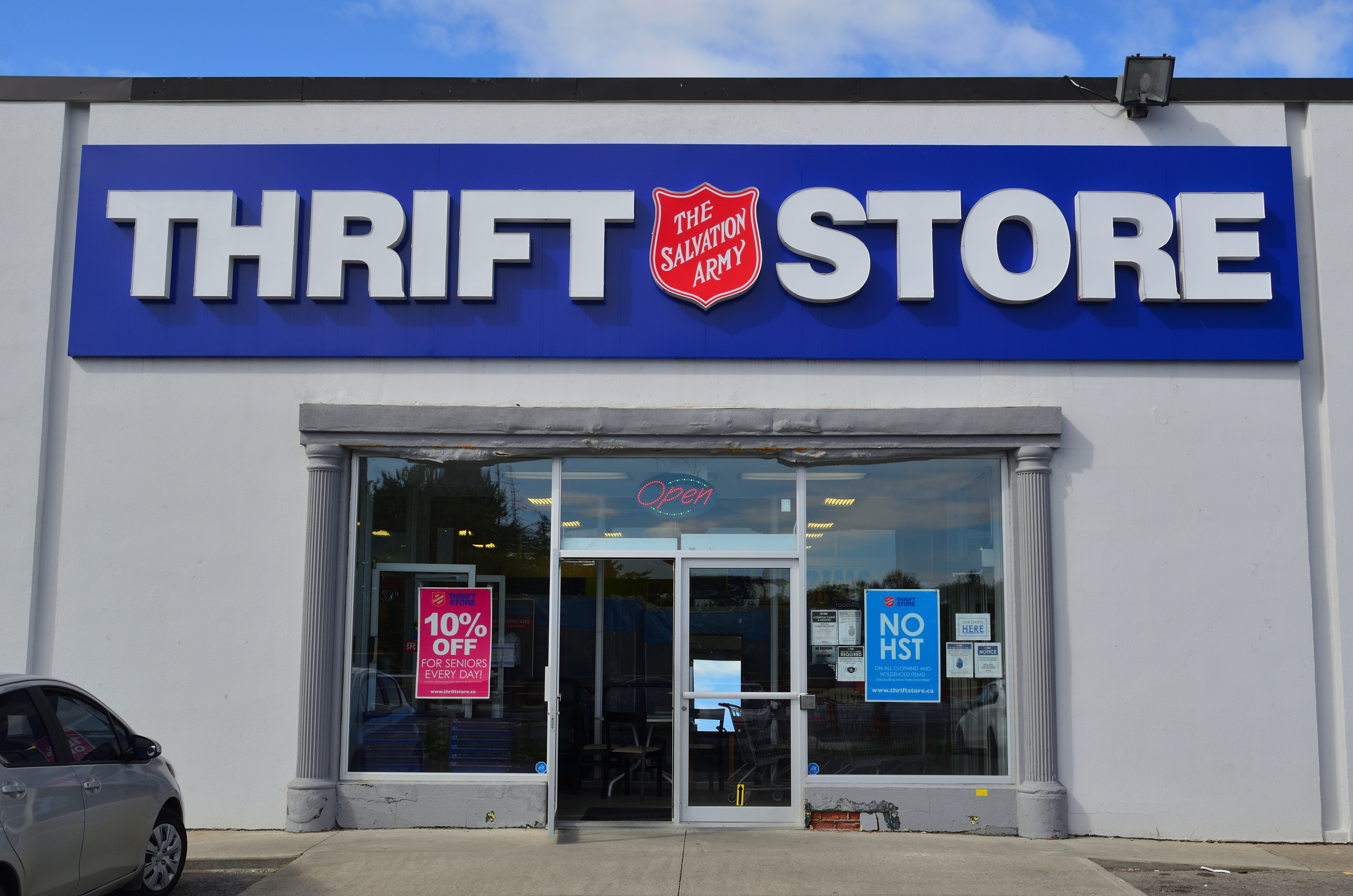
The Salvation Army Thrift Store in Richmond Hill, Ontario

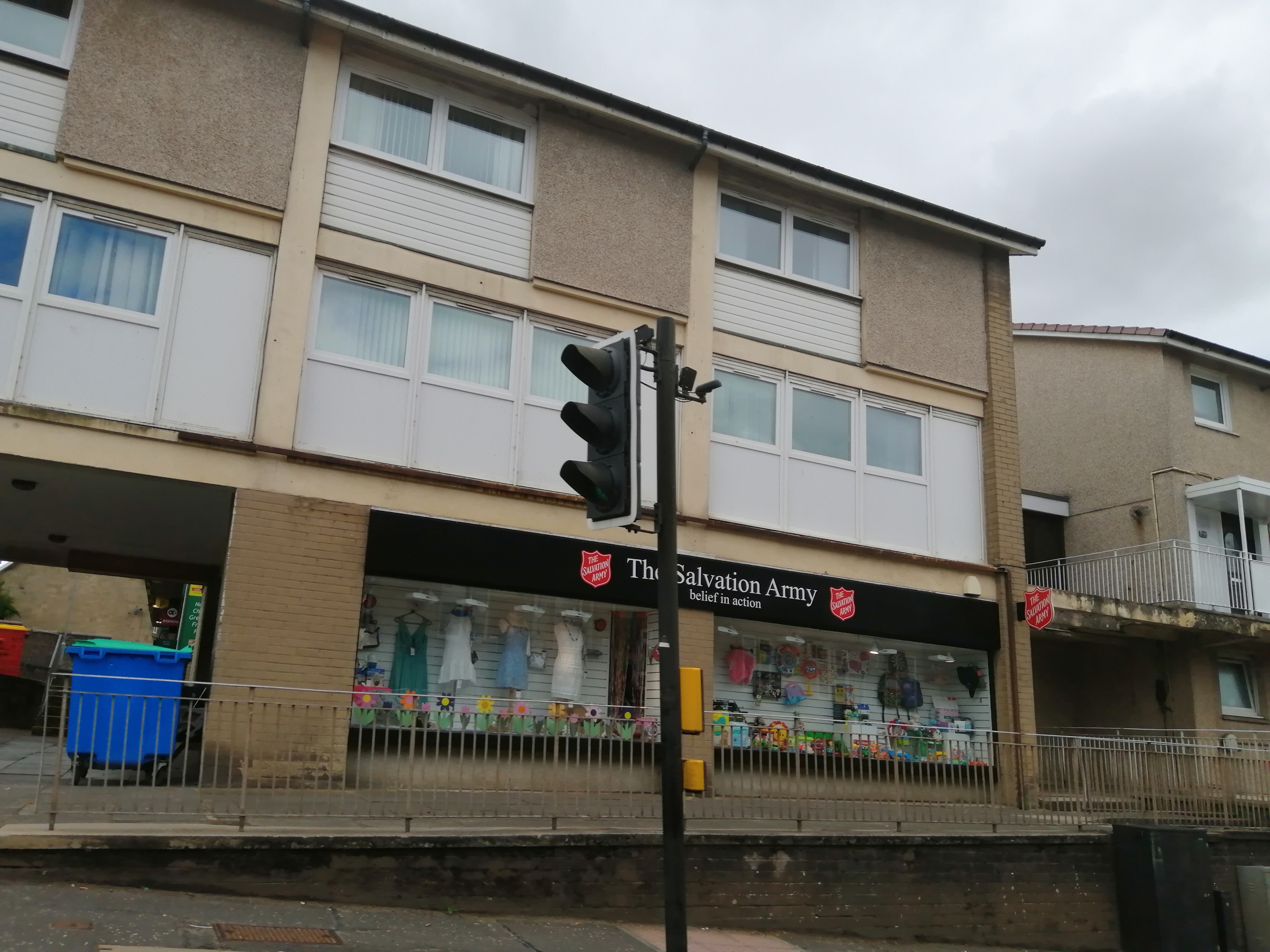
The Salvation Army in Eastfield, South Lanarkshire, Scotland

The Salvation Army is well-known for its network of charity shops colloquially referred to as "Sally Army" shop's in the United Kingdom and "the Sally Ann" in Canada and the United States, "Salvos Stores" in Australia, and "Sally's" in New Zealand—which raise money for its rehabilitation programs by selling donated used items such as clothing, housewares, and toys. Clothing collected by Salvation Army stores that is not sold on location is often sold wholesale on the global secondhand clothing market.

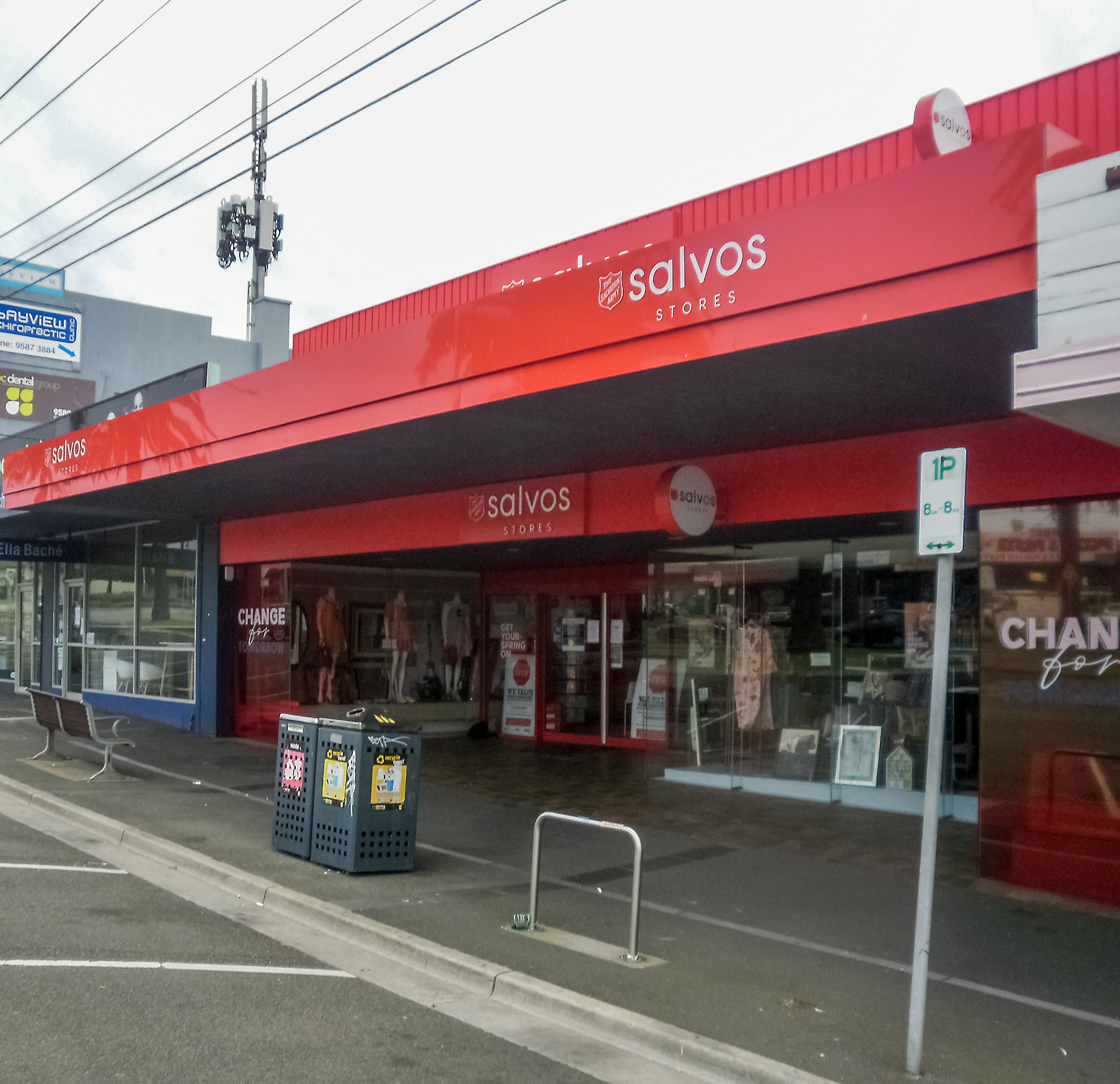
Salvos store in Victoria, Australia

The Salvation Army's fundraising shops in the United Kingdom participated in the UK government's Work Programme, a workfare programme in which benefit claimants had to work for no compensation for 20 to 40 hours per week over periods as long as six months.

When people buy items at Salvation Army thrift stores, part of the proceeds go toward The Salvation Army's emergency relief efforts and programs. Textile items not sold are recycled and turned into other items such as carpet underlay. The Salvation Army sometimes hires felons, depending on the circumstances.

=== Adult Rehabilitation Centres ===
Some Salvation Army locations are associated with an Adult Rehabilitation Centre (ARC) in which men and women make a six-month rehabilitation commitment to live and work at the ARC residence. They are unpaid, but provided with room and board. Many ARCs are male-only. The program is primarily to combat addiction. Residents work at a warehouse, store, or residence. This is referred to as "work therapy". They attend classes, twelve-step programs, and chapel services as a part of the program. The Army advertises these programs on their collection trucks with the slogan "Doing the Most Good". An ARC is typically associated with a main store and a warehouse. Donations are consolidated from other stores and donation sites, sorted and priced, and then distributed back out to the branch stores. Low-quality donated items are sometimes sold at the warehouse dock in a "dock sale".

=== Hadleigh Farm Colony ===
Farmland at Hadleigh in Essex featured market gardens, orchards, and two brickfields. It was mentioned in the Royal Commission report of 1909, which was appointed to consider Poor Laws. 7,000 trainees had passed through its doors by 1912 with more than 60% subsequently finding employment.

=== Other ===
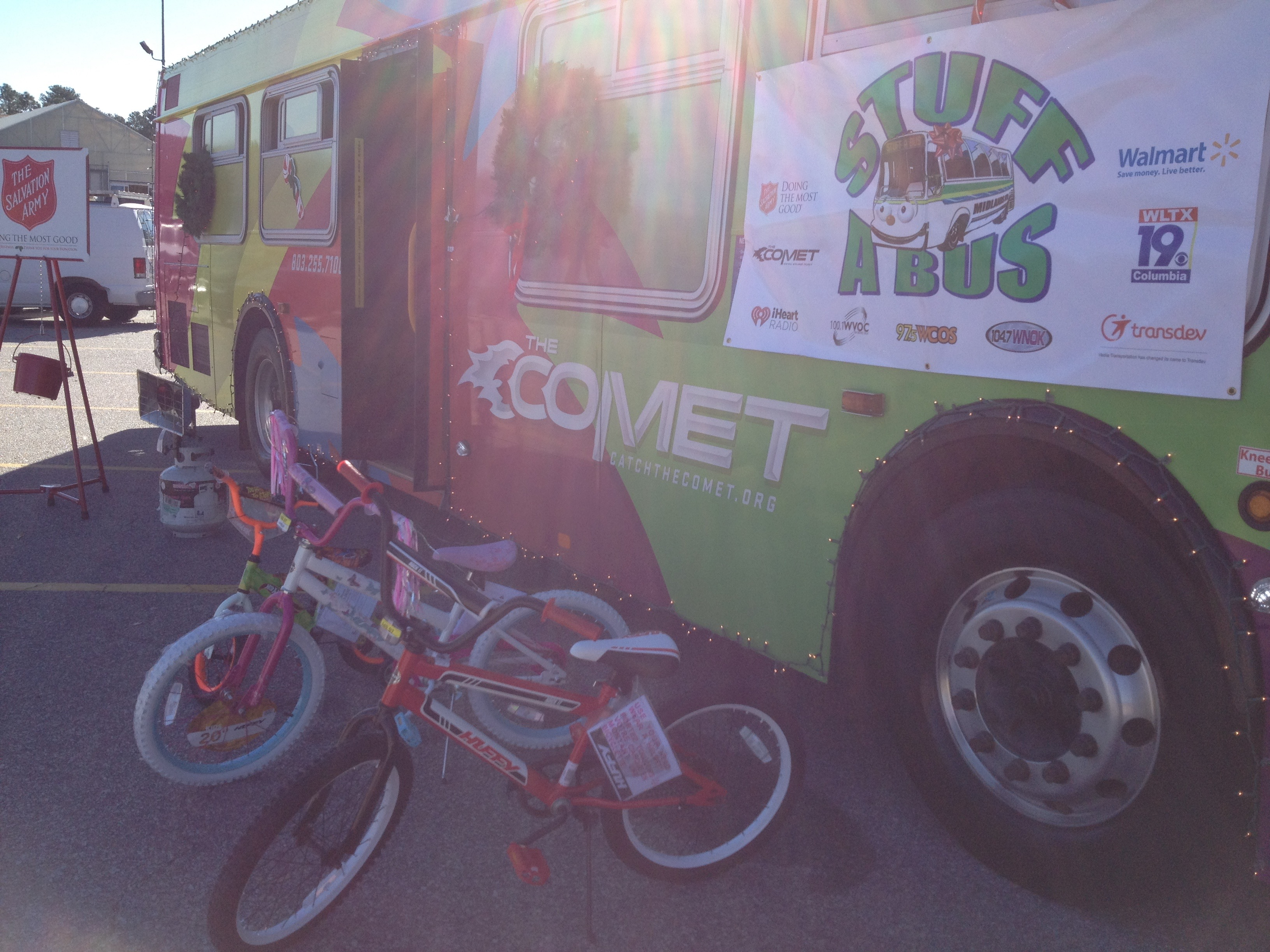
"Stuff-a-Bus" toy collection at Christmas time

It has headquarter offices internationally, nationally, and for each territory and division. Some of its other facilities and programs include:

- Homeless hostels
- Residential addiction dependency programs
- Children's after-school programs
- Children's homes
- Children's summer camps
- Homes for elderly persons
- Adult day care centres
- Mother and baby homes
- Women's and men's refuge centres
- General hospitals
- Schools
- Maternity hospitals
- Food pantries
- Overnight warming stations
- Cooling stations

== Beliefs ==
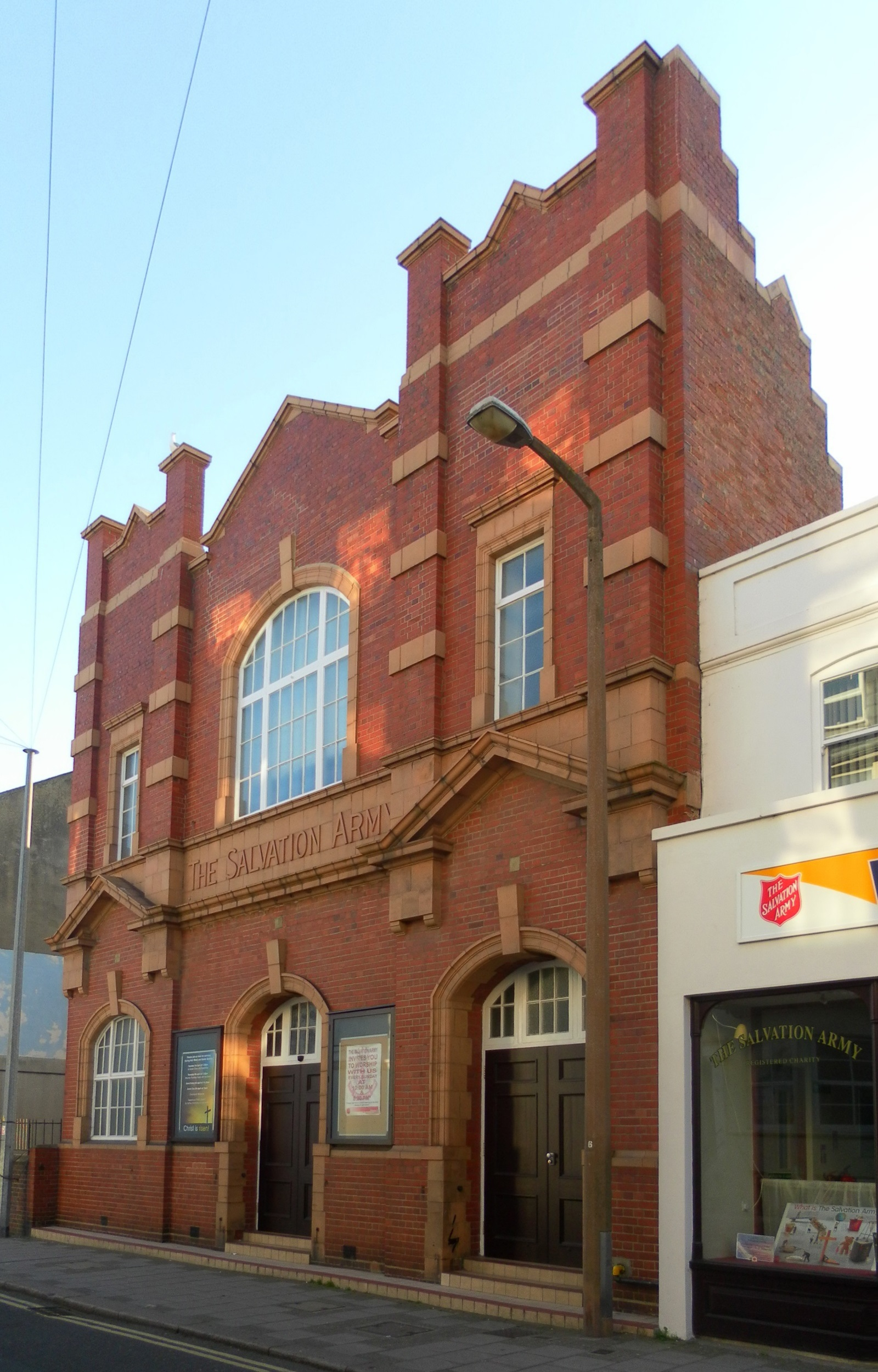
A Salvation Army citadel (Corps) with a charity shop attached, in Worthing, West Sussex.

The official mission statement reads:

The Salvation Army, an international movement, is an evangelical part of the universal Christian church. Its message is based on the Bible. Its ministry is motivated by the love of God. Its mission is to preach the gospel of Jesus Christ and to meet human needs in His name without discrimination.

Early beliefs of the Salvation Army were influenced by the book Helps to Holiness, which influenced spiritual life in the Army for a generation. The sacred text of the Salvation Army is the (Protestant) Bible, and the beliefs of the Salvation Army rest upon eleven doctrines:

1. We believe that the Scriptures of the Old and New Testaments were given by inspiration of God; and that they only constitute the Divine rule of Christian faith and practice.
2. We believe that there is only one God, who is infinitely perfect, the Creator, Preserver, and Governor of all things, and who is the only proper object of religious worship.
3. We believe that there are three persons in the Godhead – the Father, the Son and the Holy Ghost – undivided in essence and co-equal in power and glory.
4. We believe that in the person of Jesus Christ, the Divine and human natures are united, so that He is truly and properly God and truly and properly man.
5. We believe that our first parents were created in a state of innocency, but by their disobedience, they lost their purity and happiness; and that in consequence of their fall all men have become sinners, totally depraved, and as such are justly exposed to the wrath of God.
6. We believe that the Lord Jesus Christ has, by His suffering and death, made an atonement for the whole world so that whosoever believes in him will not perish but have eternal life.
7. We believe that repentance towards God, faith in our Lord Jesus Christ and regeneration by the Holy Spirit are necessary to salvation.
8. We believe that we are justified by grace, through faith in our Lord Jesus Christ; and that he that believeth hath the witness in himself.
9. We believe that continuance in a state of salvation depends upon continued obedient faith in Christ.
10. We believe that it is the privilege of all believers to be wholly sanctified, and that their whole spirit and soul and body may be preserved blameless unto the coming of our Lord Jesus Christ.
11. We believe in the immortality of the soul; in the resurrection of the body; in the general judgment at the end of the world; in the eternal happiness of the righteous; and in the endless punishment of the wicked.

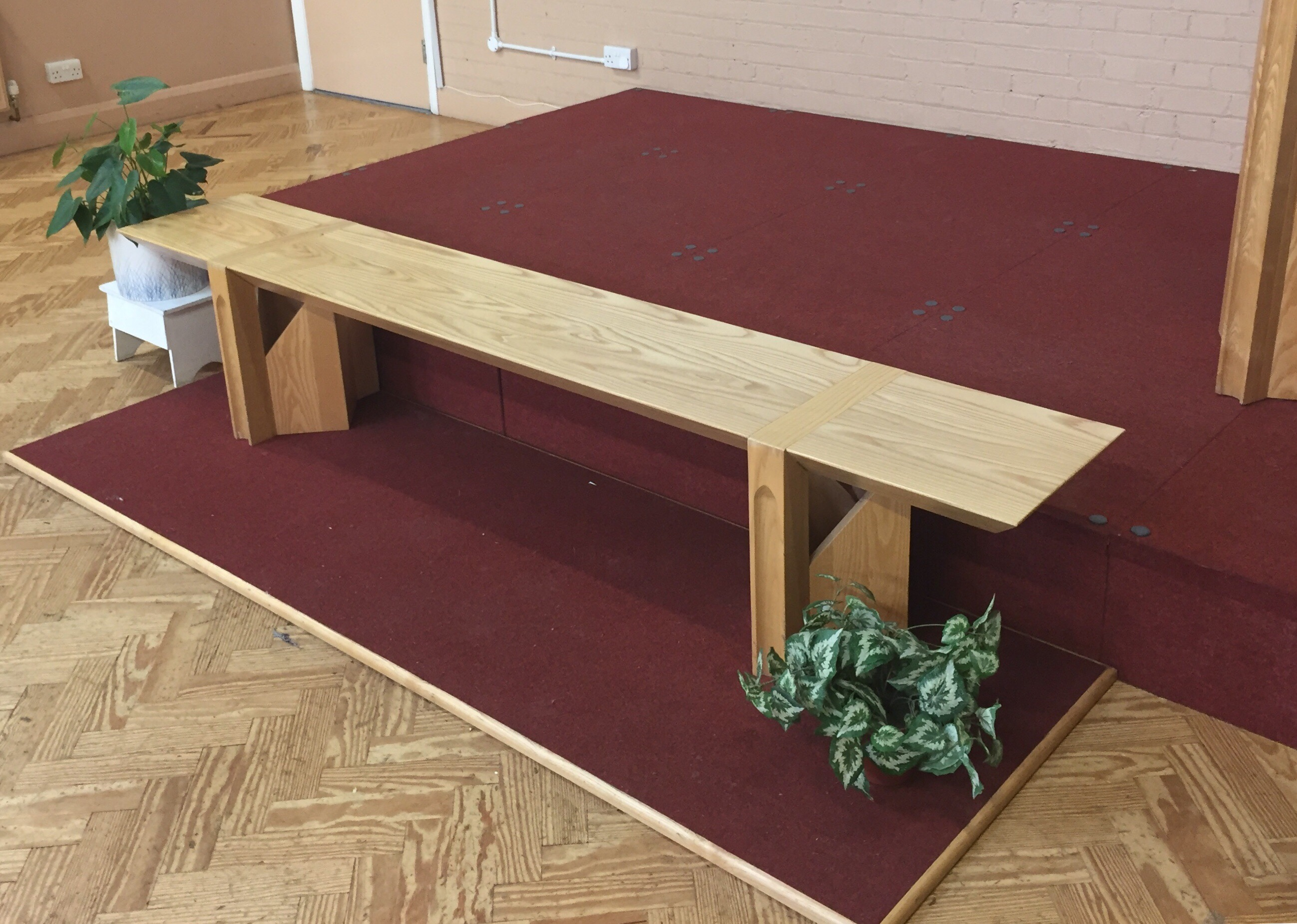
The Mercy Seat in a Salvation Army citadel.

The denomination does not celebrate sacraments, such as Baptism and Holy Communion. The position of the International Spiritual Life Commission, which is convened by the general to examine and identify aspects of the Army's life that are essential or integral to the spiritual growth, is that enrollment as a soldier by accepting the call to discipleship should be followed by a lifetime of continued obedient faith in Christ. The Commission's considered opinion of Holy Communion is that God's grace is readily accessible in all places and at all times, although Salvationists may participate in Holy Communion if attending a service of worship in another Christian denomination if the host Church allows.

Although its officers conduct marriages, the Salvation Army holds a traditional Protestant belief that marriage was not instituted by Christ and therefore is not a sacrament. The mercy seat is a focal point in a Salvation Army Church, symbolizing God's call to his people, and a place for commitment and communion, and is available for anyone to kneel at in prayer.

=== Worship services ===
The Salvation Army does not require anyone attending a service to be a member of the Salvation Army in any capacity (as a soldier, adherent, or officer). Services in Salvation Army churches feature a variety of activities:

- The service often begins with a greeting from the Minister.
- Hymns are sung, accompanied by backing music.
- There is a scripture reading from the Bible.
- Prayers are led by the Minister leading the service.
- Depending on demand, a Sunday School may be run in another room.
- A collection is held to receive a financial offering, either loose money or coins in a cartridge envelope. This is sometimes referred to as "Tithes and Offerings".
- The congregation sings the doxology.
- A sermon on the Bible reading is then given.
- The service concludes with a benediction.

=== Soldier's Covenant ===
The Soldier's Covenant is the creed of the Salvation Army. All members of the church are allowed to subscribe to this creed; every person has to sign the document before they can become enrolled as a soldier. Members have traditionally been referred to as "soldiers" of Christ. The covenant includes a list of the eleven articles of faith, and was formerly known as the "Articles of War".

=== Positional Statements ===
Positional Statements describe Salvation Army policy on various social and moral issues. They are carefully considered by the International Headquarters of The Salvation Army. They are derived from work by the International Moral and Social Issues Council. The Salvation Army opposes euthanasia and assisted suicide. Its official stance on abortion is that "The Salvation Army believes in the sanctity of all human life and considers each person to be of infinite value and each life a gift from God to be cherished, nurtured and redeemed. Human life is sacred because it is made in the image of God and has an eternal destiny. (Genesis 1:27) Sacredness is not conferred, nor can it be taken away by human agreement." The Salvation Army official stance admitted in 2010 exceptions in cases such as rape and incest: "In addition, rape and incest are brutal acts of dominance violating women physically and emotionally. This situation represents a special case for the consideration of termination as the violation may be compounded by the continuation of the pregnancy." It is also against the death penalty: "The Salvation Army recognises that the opinions of Salvationists are divided on the moral acceptability of capital punishment and its effectiveness as a deterrent. To advocate in any way the continuance or restoration of capital punishment in any part of the world would be inconsistent with the Army's purposes and contrary to the Army's belief that all human life is sacred and that each human being, however wretched, can become a new person in Christ."

In 2012, the Salvation Army, Australian Territories published a "Positional Statement on Homosexuality" after receiving adverse publicity about their position on homosexuality.

The Bible teaches that God's intention for humankind is that society should be ordered on the basis of lifelong, legally sanctioned heterosexual unions.... A disposition towards homosexuality is not in itself blameworthy nor is the disposition seen as rectifiable at will.... Homosexual practice however, is, in the light of Scripture, clearly unacceptable. Such activity is chosen behaviour and is thus a matter of the will. It is therefore able to be directed or restrained in the same way heterosexual urges are controlled. Homosexual practice would render any person ineligible for full membership (soldiership) in the Army.

On 8 December 2017, the Salvation Army released an International Positional Statement on racism that says that racism is "fundamentally incompatible with the Christian conviction that all people are made in the image of God and are equal in value. The Salvation Army believes that the world is enriched by a diversity of cultures and ethnicities."

== Community services ==
=== Disaster relief ===
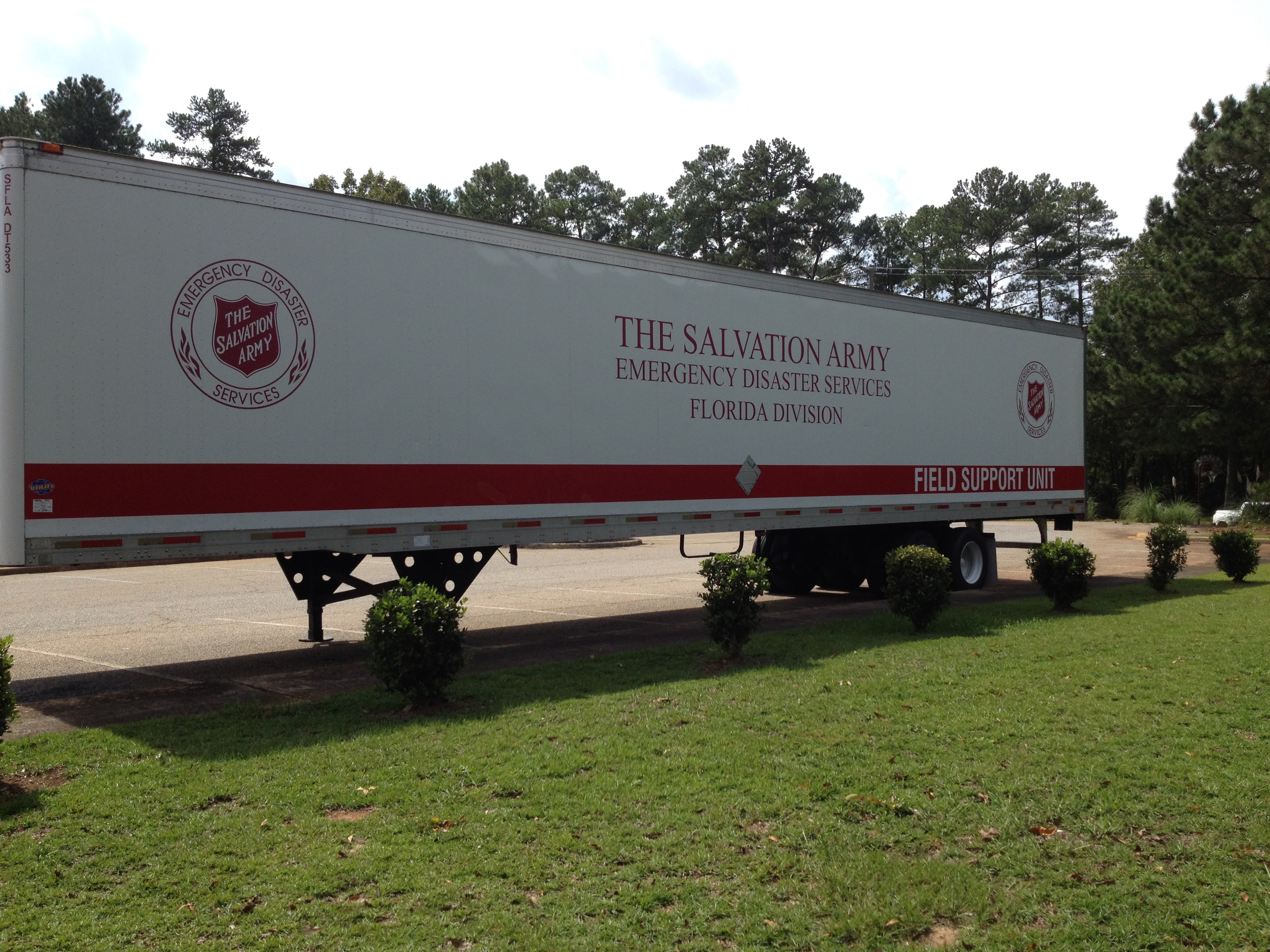
Salvation Army Emergency Disaster Trailer

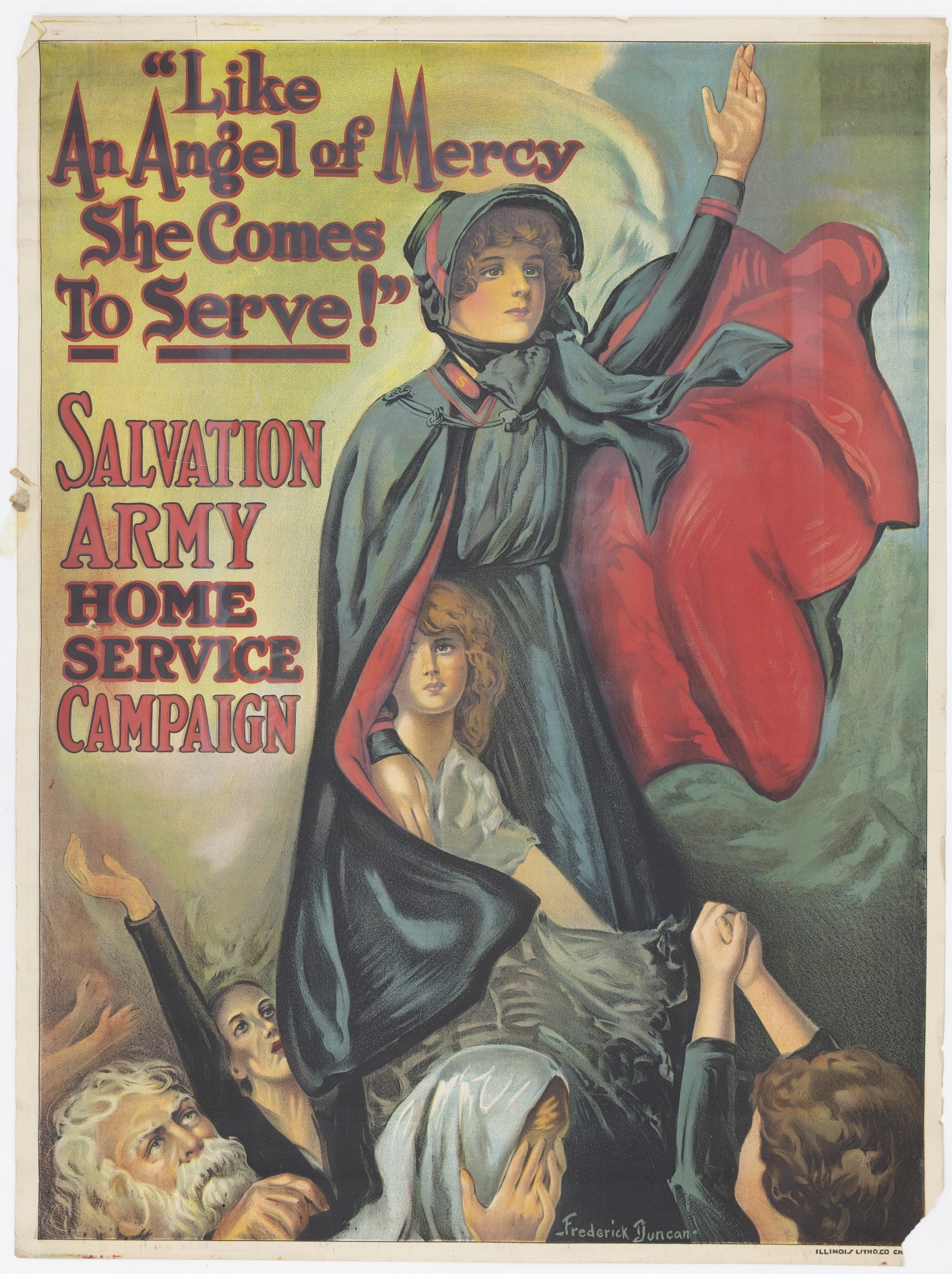
"Like An Angel of Mercy She Comes To Serve!", 1914-1918

In the United States, the Salvation Army's first major forays into disaster relief resulted from the tragedies of the Galveston Hurricane of 1900 and the 1906 San Francisco earthquake. General Evangeline Booth offered the services of Salvationists to President Woodrow Wilson during the First World War.

The Salvation Army is a nongovernmental relief agency. After the Indian Ocean tsunami in 2004, they arrived at the disaster sites to help retrieve and bury the dead. Since then they have helped rebuild homes and construct new boats for people to recover their livelihood. Members were prominent among relief organisations after Hurricane Hugo and Hurricane Andrew.

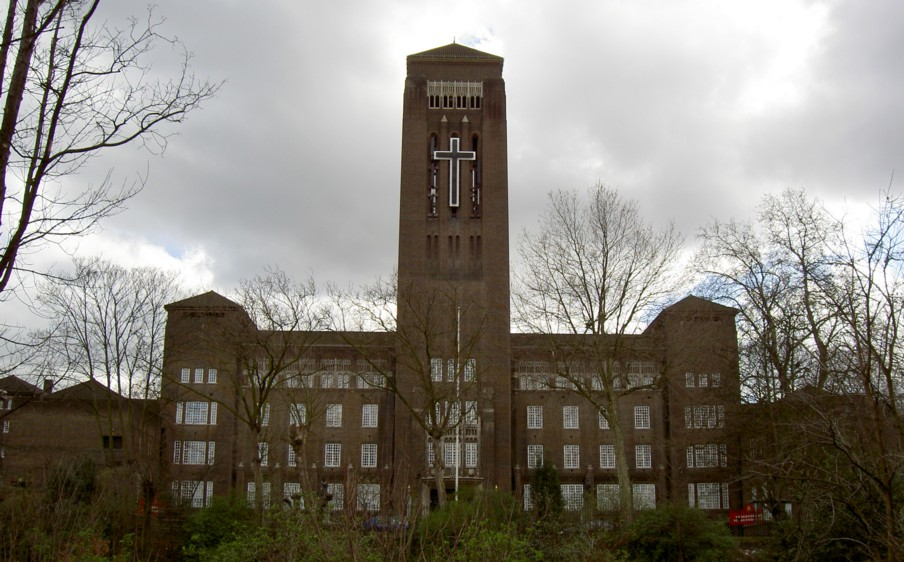
The William Booth Memorial Training College, Denmark Hill, London: The College for Officer Training of the Salvation Army in the UK

Since Hurricane Katrina struck the Gulf Coast, the Salvation Army has allocated donations of more than US$365 million to serve more than 1.7 million people in nearly every American state. The Army's immediate response to Hurricane Katrina included the mobilization of more than 178 canteen feeding units and eleven field kitchens that together served more than 5.7 million hot meals, 8.3 million sandwiches, snacks, and drinks. Its SATERN (Salvation Army Team Emergency Radio Network) network of amateur ham-radio operators picked up where modern communications left off to help locate more than 25,000 survivors. Salvation Army pastoral care counselors were on hand to comfort the emotional and spiritual needs of 277,000 individuals.

The Salvation Army, along with the American National Red Cross, Southern Baptist Convention, and other disaster relief organisations, are members of the National Voluntary Organisations Active in Disaster (NVOAD).

Around the world, the Salvation Army have emergency services support emergency disaster services in the United States. These are mobile canteen vehicles that provide food and other welfare to members of the Emergency Services at bushfires, floods, land search, and other large- and small-scale emergency operations undertaken by Police, Fire, Ambulance, and State Emergency Service members, and to the general public affected by such events.

==== Alove UK ====
In the 21st century, the Salvation Army in the United Kingdom created a branch for the youth, called Alove: the Salvation Army for a new generation. Its purpose is to free the youth of the church and their communities to express themselves and their faith in their own ways. Its mission statement is "Calling a generation to dynamic faith, radical lifestyle, adventurous mission and a fight for justice". It emphasises worship, discipleship, missions, and social action. Alove is a member of the National Council for Voluntary Youth Services (NCVYS).

=== Work against exploitation ===
The Salvation Army works with a specialist team in partnership with the UK service Modern Slavery Helpline to operate a hotline for people have been exploited for labor or profits.

== Operation of hostels ==
The organisation also assists homeless people by running 461 hostels.

=== COVID-19 relief ===
In 2020, during the COVID-19 pandemic, The Salvation Army donated 224,603,024 meals and 1,822,412 personal protective equipment supply kits in the United States.

== Organisational structure ==
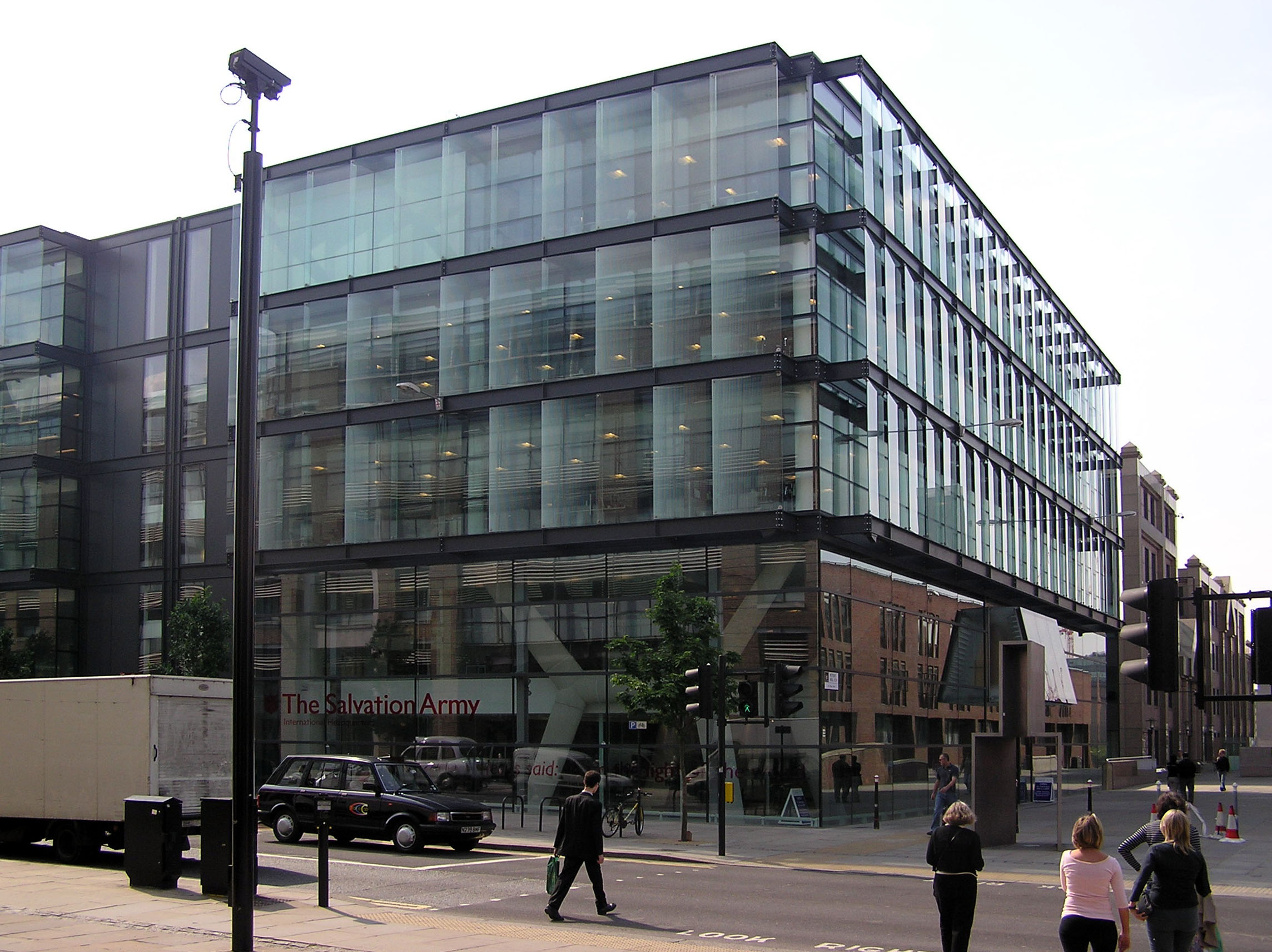
The Salvation Army International Headquarters in London

The Salvation Army operates in 133 countries. The General is the head of the Salvation Army. The organisation divides itself geographically into five zones: Americas and Caribbean, Europe, South Asia, South Pacific and East Asia, and Africa. The "zonal departments" at International Headquarters in London, United Kingdom, are the head of global territories and commands.

Each territory is further divided into territories, which are then sub-divided into divisions. Some territories cover several countries (like Italy and Greece) while some countries may have several territories (e.g. Australia Eastern and Australia Southern)

=== High Councils ===
Much of what happens at the High Council is governed by British law, as set out in the Salvation Army Acts (1931, 1963, 1968, 1980). The 2013 High Council consisted of 118 members (62 women and 56 men) made up of the Chief of Staff, all the active commissioners and territorial leaders (some territories are led by colonels), each of whom was summoned by the Chief of the Staff for the sole purpose of electing a new General.

=== Heritage Centres ===
Heritage Centres are museums run by the Salvation Army that have exhibits and historical documents related to the history and work of the organisation. Heritage Centres collect, preserve, catalogue, research, and share material about the life and work of The Salvation Army. The International Heritage Centre in London can provide details of premises in any specific territory.

=== Relevant legislation ===
Various Constituting Instruments apply to different aspects of the work of the Salvation Army. Legislation passed in the United Kingdom Parliament covered the following:

- The Salvation Army Act 1931 contained several provisions, firstly that the High Council be convened to elect a new General when the role became vacant, and reorganised custody of property held in charitable trust by the foundation of the Salvation Army Trustee Company being formed to hold all property previously vested in the general. Section 4 relates to a serving General giving notice of their intention to retire.
- The Salvation Army Act 1963 established a non-contributory pension fund for Officers of the Salvation Army.
- The Salvation Army Act 1968 relates to management of Salvation Army trusts.
- The Salvation Army Act 1980 revised and consolidated the constitution of the Salvation Army to continue its work.
  - Schedule 1 covered the Religious Doctrines of the Army
  - Schedule 2 related to Common Investment Schemes and the establishment of a Central Finance Council
  - Part V covered the Election of the General

=== Membership ===
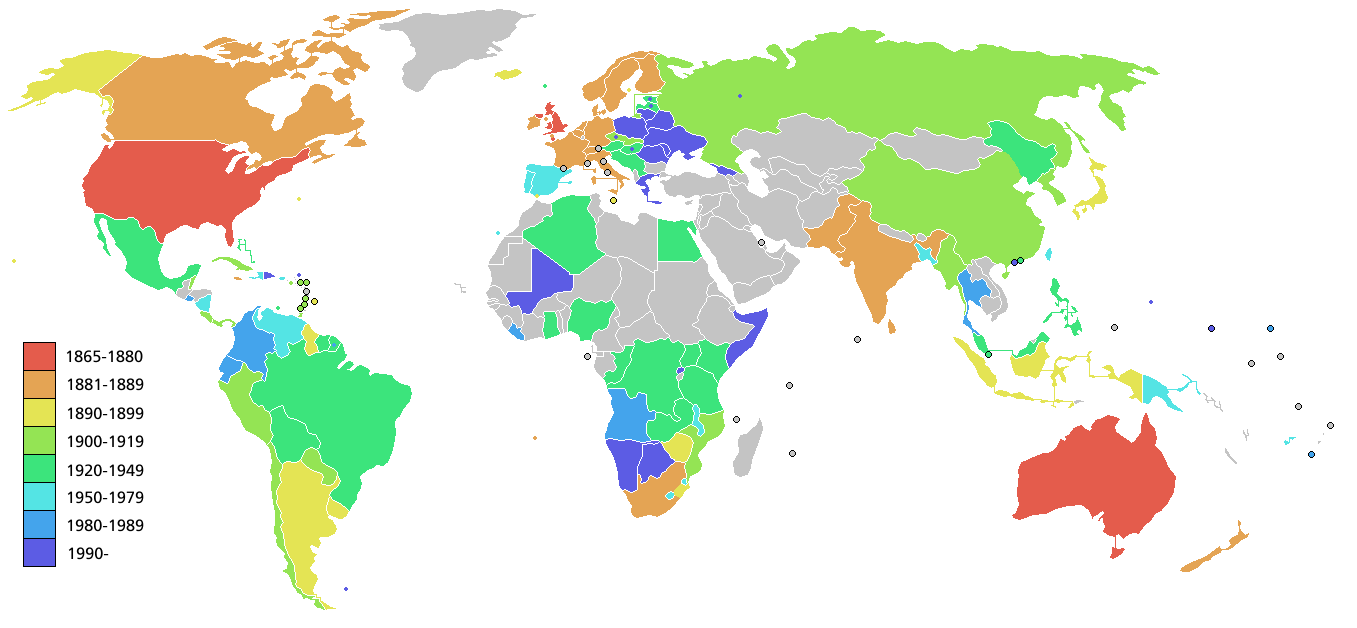
The worldwide expansion of Salvation army

Statistics for membership from the 2018 year book, are: 111,859 employees, 17,168 Active Officers, 9,775 Retired Officers, 1,050 Cadets, 175,811 Adherents, 411,327 Junior Soldiers and 1,182,100 Senior Soldiers. Previous membership statistics (as quoted from 2010 year book) include 16,938 active and 9,190 retired officers, 39,071 Corps Cadets and more than 4.5 million volunteers. Members of the Salvation Army also include "adherents"; these are people who do not make the commitment to be a soldier but who recognise the Salvation Army as their church. (According to the 2006 Salvation Army year book, in the United States there are 85,148 senior soldiers and 28,377 junior soldiers, 17,396 adherents and around 60,000 employees.)

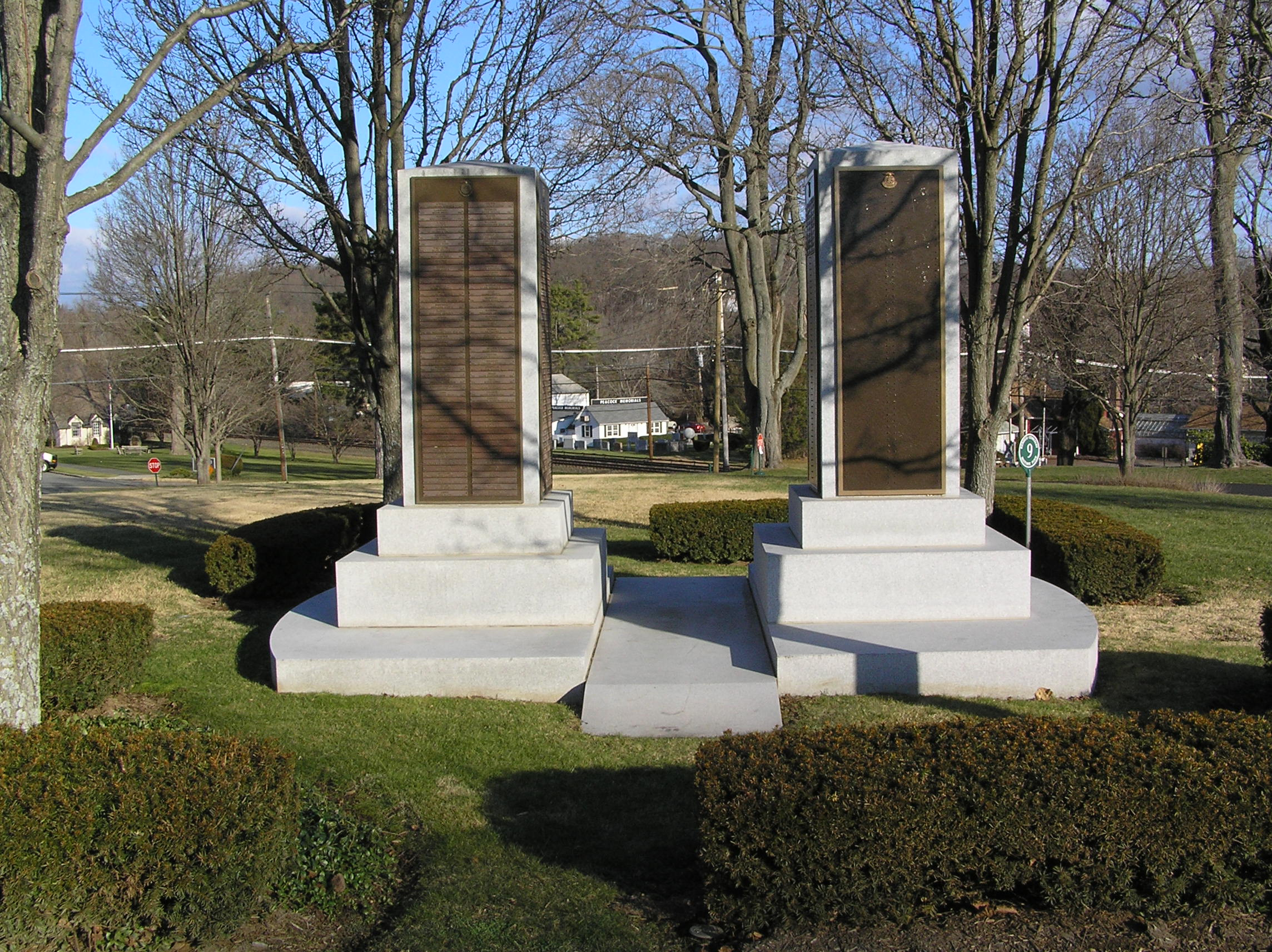
The monument to the Salvation Army in Kensico Cemetery

=== International Congress of the Salvation Army ===
The International Congress of the Salvation Army is normally held every ten years as a conference for all Salvationists from around the world to meet. The first such conference took place in London, U.K., from 28 May to 4 June 1886, and subsequent Congressional meetings were held sporadically until 1904 and then 1990. The seventh International Congress in Atlanta, Georgia, United States, from 28 June to 2 July 2000, was the first held outside of the U.K.

=== Presence in Russia ===
In Russia the Army was founded around 1917 and it struggled until 1922 at which point the situation had become extremely challenging. A Moscow court ruled that the Salvation Army was a paramilitary organisation subject to expulsion. In October 2006, the European Court of Human Rights ruled the decision illegal. The Salvation Army International website lists the Russian Federation as part of the Territory of Eastern Europe.

=== Presence in China ===
William Booth's dying wish for the Salvation Army to be established in China was taken up in a pledge made in 1912 by Bramwell Booth to his father.

== Symbols ==
=== Flag ===
Standard of The Salvation Army (Anglophone version)

The Salvation Army flag is a symbol of the Army's war against sin and social evils. The red on the flag symbolises the blood of Jesus Christ, the yellow for the fire of the Holy Spirit, and the blue for purity and God.

=== Crest ===
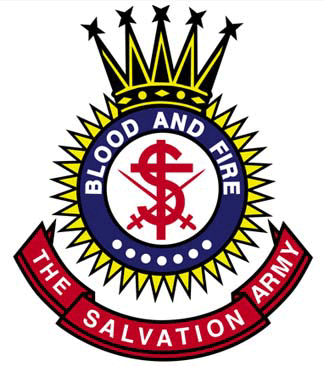
Crest of The Salvation Army (Anglophone version)

The oldest official emblem of The Salvation Army is the crest. In 1878 Captain W.H. Ebdon suggested a logo, and in 1879 it was to be found on the letterhead of the Salvation Army Headquarters. The captain's suggested design was changed only slightly and a crown was added.

The Army's crest contains Biblical references though its symbolism:

- The sun with its rays represents the light and fire of the Holy Spirit. (Matthew 3:11)
- The cross represents the cross of Jesus on which He died as a sacrifice for our sins. (Romans 3:25)
- The letter "S" represents the salvation that is available to all people through Jesus Christ. (John 3:16–17)
- The crossed swords represent God's Word (Hebrews 4:12). God's Word is the Christian's weapon in the salvation war (the war against Satan and evil).
- The Gospel shots (Psalm 119:160) represent the basic truths of the Gospel; there are 7 in all.
  1. The existence of a Holy God;
  2. The evils of sin are against God and man;
  3. There will be punishment for sin that is fair and everlasting;
  4. Jesus died on the cross for the human race;
  5. Salvation is for all mankind and is free to all who accept Jesus Christ;
  6. It is the responsibility of every Christian to do whatever they can do to spread the Gospel;
  7. God rewards those who are faithful with eternal life in Heaven with Him.
- The words "Blood and Fire" as the "war cry" of the Salvation Army. It is Jesus' blood that washes us clean from sin and it is the fire of the Holy Spirit that makes us pure and helps us live lives that are pleasing to God.
- The crown represents the "Crown of Life and Glory" that God will give to all those who have been faithful to Him (James 1:12).

=== Red Shield ===
The Red Shield has its origins in Salvation Army work during wartime. At the end of the 19th century, Staff-Captain Mary Murray was sent by William Booth to support British troops serving in the Boer War in South Africa. Then, in 1901, this same officer was given the task of establishing the Naval and Military League, the forerunner of the Red Shield Services.

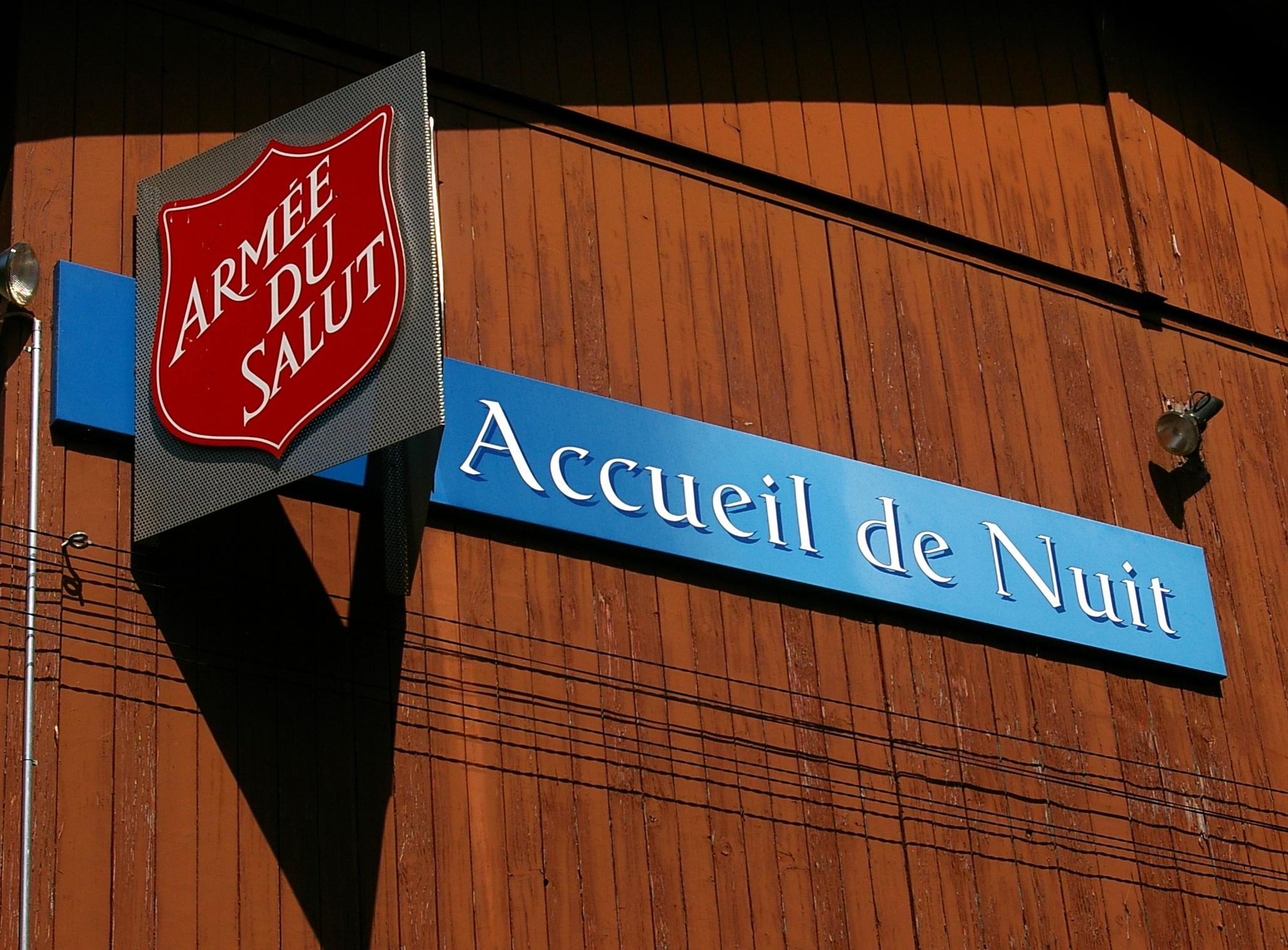
The Salvation Army red shield logo, displayed on the side of a night shelter in Geneva, Switzerland.

Salvation Army officers serving in the Red Shield Services in wartime performed many functions. The Doughnut Girls of World War I are an early example, who served refreshments to troops in the trenches. They also provided first aid stations, ambulances, chaplaincy, social clubs, Christian worship, and other front-line services.

This symbol is still used in Blue Shield Services that serve the British Armed Forces but it is widely used as a simple, more readily identifiable symbol in many Salvation Army settings. It is common to see the Red Shield used on a casual Salvation Army uniform. It is now official Salvation Army policy in the U.K. that the red shield should be used as the external symbol of the Salvation Army, with the Crest only being used internally. Therefore, any new Salvation Army building will now have the red shield on the outside rather than the crest that certainly would have been used on its Corps (church) buildings. This was "imposed" in the U.K. by the Senior Management with little or no consultation with members. Not all have welcomed this change.

=== Uniform ===
Salvation Army officers, cadets (trainee officers) and soldiers often wear uniforms. The idea that they should do so originated with Elijah Cadman, who, at the Salvation Army's "War Congress" in August 1878, said, "I would like to wear a suit of clothes that would let everyone know I meant war to the teeth and salvation for the world". The uniform identifies the wearer as a Salvationist and a Christian. It also symbolises availability to those in need. The uniform takes many forms internationally but is characterised by the "S" insignia for "Salvation" and carries the meaning "Saved to Serve", or "Saved to Save". Different colours and styles represent different ranks including soldiers, cadets, lieutenants, captains, majors, colonels, commissioner, and General.

Characteristics of the uniform vary between ranks where accessories (the official term is "trimmings") consist of epaulettes and hexagonal lapel patches. The uniform varies with the position and rank:

- Soldier: plain black epaulettes (Corps name woven into base of epaulette) and black lapel patch with "S"
- Musician: plain blue or black epaulettes and lapel patch with "S"
- Cadet: black epaulette with 1 or 2 red bars corresponding to number of years of training and black lapel patch with "S"
- Officer ranks:
  - Lieutenant: red epaulette with one silver star and red lapel patch with "S"
  - Captain: red epaulette with two silver stars and red lapel patch with "S"
  - Major: red epaulette with silver crest and red lapel patch with "S"

Other letters are substituted to conform with local language. The words "The Salvation Army" are woven into the fabric of the uniform as a logo on shirts, blouses, and jackets.

=== Tartan ===
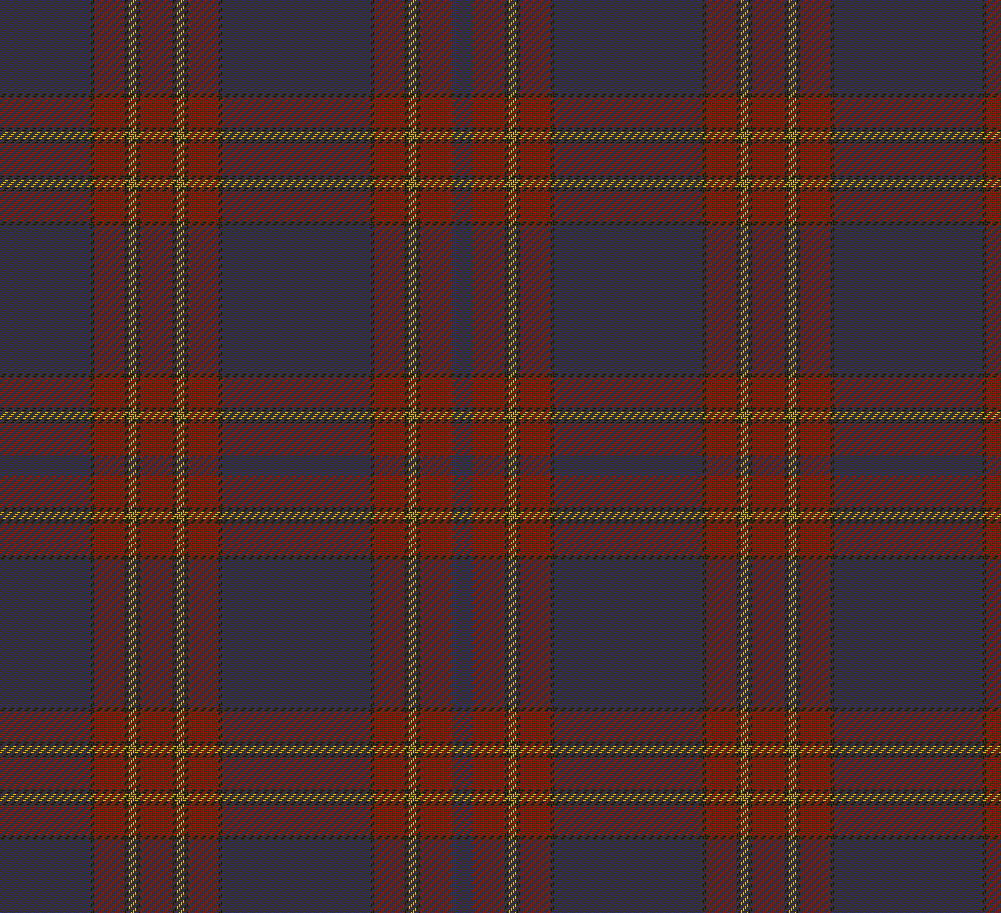
The Salvation Army Dress Tartan

Since 1983 there has been an official Salvation Army tartan. It was designed by Captain Harry Cooper, for the Perth Citadel Corps centenary commemoration in Scotland. It is based upon the colours of the Salvation Army flag, with which it shares the same symbolism. It is rarely seen outside Scotland.

=== Salute ===
The Salvation Army has a unique form of salute that involves raising the right hand above shoulder height with the index finger pointing upwards. It signifies recognition of a fellow citizen of heaven, and a pledge to do everything possible to get others to heaven also. A Salvationist who salutes in this manner in response to applause, signifies that they wish to give glory to God and not themselves. In some instances, the salute is accompanied with a shout of "hallelujah!"

=== Red kettles ===
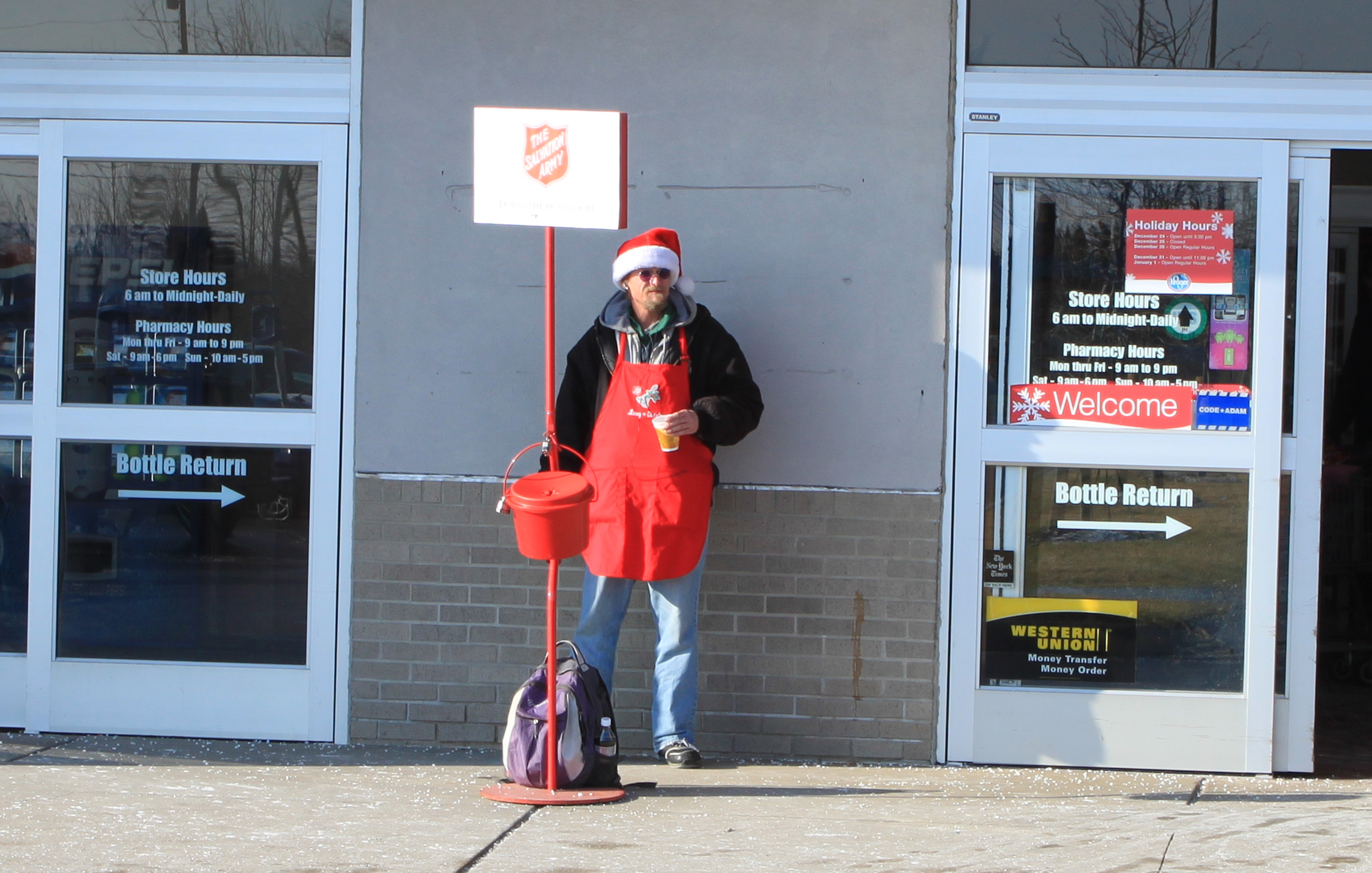
Red kettle at supermarket entrance, Ypsilanti, Michigan

In many countries, the Salvation Army is recognised during the Christmas season as its volunteers and employees stand outside of businesses and play or sing Christmas carols, or ring bells to inspire passers-by to place donations of cash and cheques inside red kettles. A tradition has developed in the United States in which, in some places, gold coins or rings or bundles of large bills are anonymously inserted into the kettles. This was first recorded in 1982, in Crystal Lake, Illinois, a suburb of Chicago. Red kettles are not only used during the Christmas season, but throughout the year at other fundraising events, such as on National Doughnut Day in the U.S. On this day, some doughnut shops that teamed up with the Salvation Army have a red kettle set up for donations. Each corps has a monetary goal chosen for them by Divisional Headquarters, which differs based on size and capability.

=== Red Shield Appeal and Self-Denial Appeal ===
The Red Shield Appeal and Self-Denial Appeal are annual fundraising campaigns in some territories, such as the U.K. and Australia. Each year, officers, soldiers, employees, and volunteers take to the streets worldwide to participate in door-to-door or street collections. The money raised is channelled towards The Salvation Army's social work in each respective territory. Within the territory defined by the United Kingdom and Ireland (UKIT) this collection is known as the Annual Appeal, and it often carries another name that the general public would more readily know—in 2012 it became The Big Collection.

=== Music playing ===
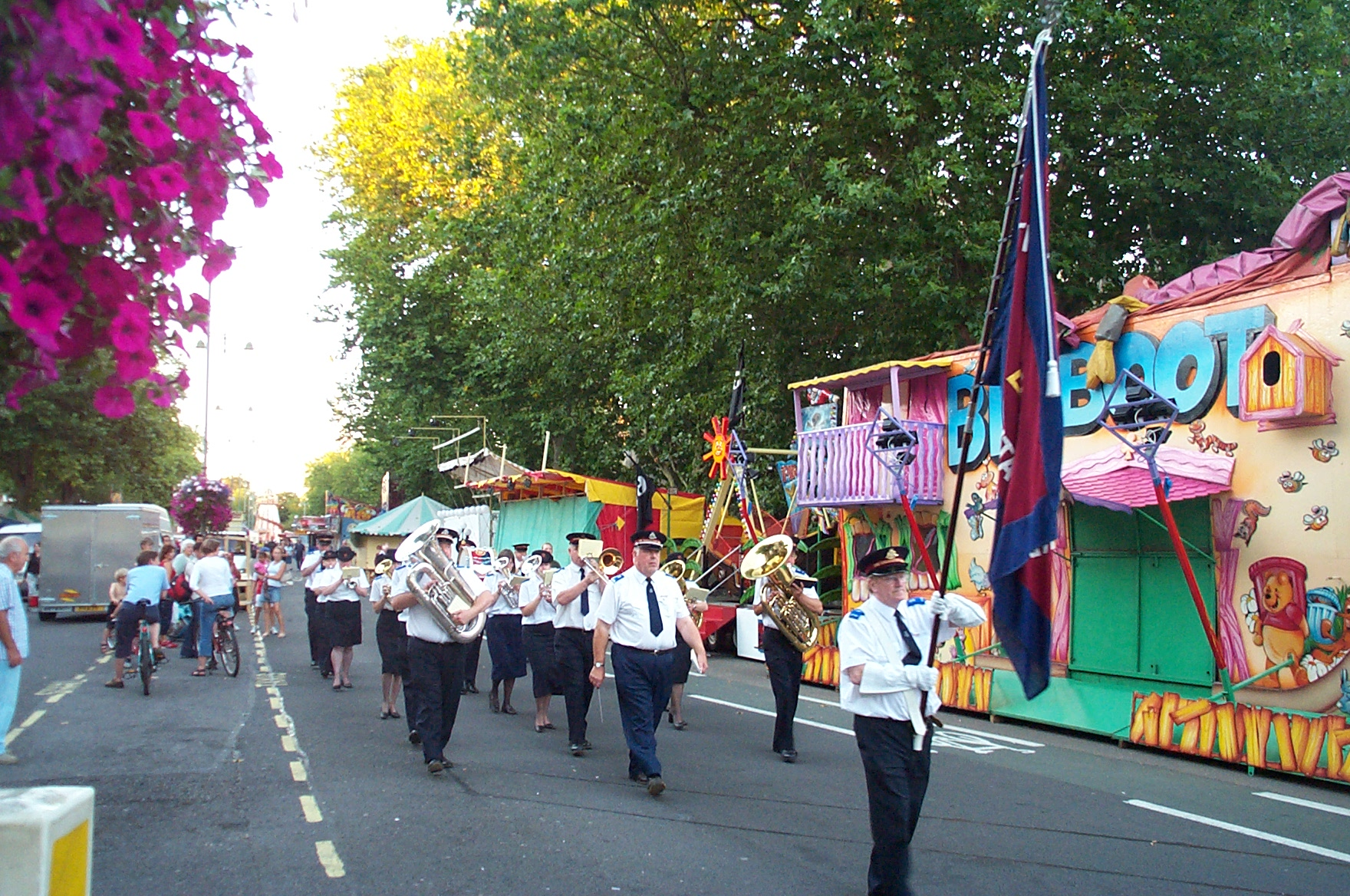
A Salvation Army band parade in Oxford, United Kingdom

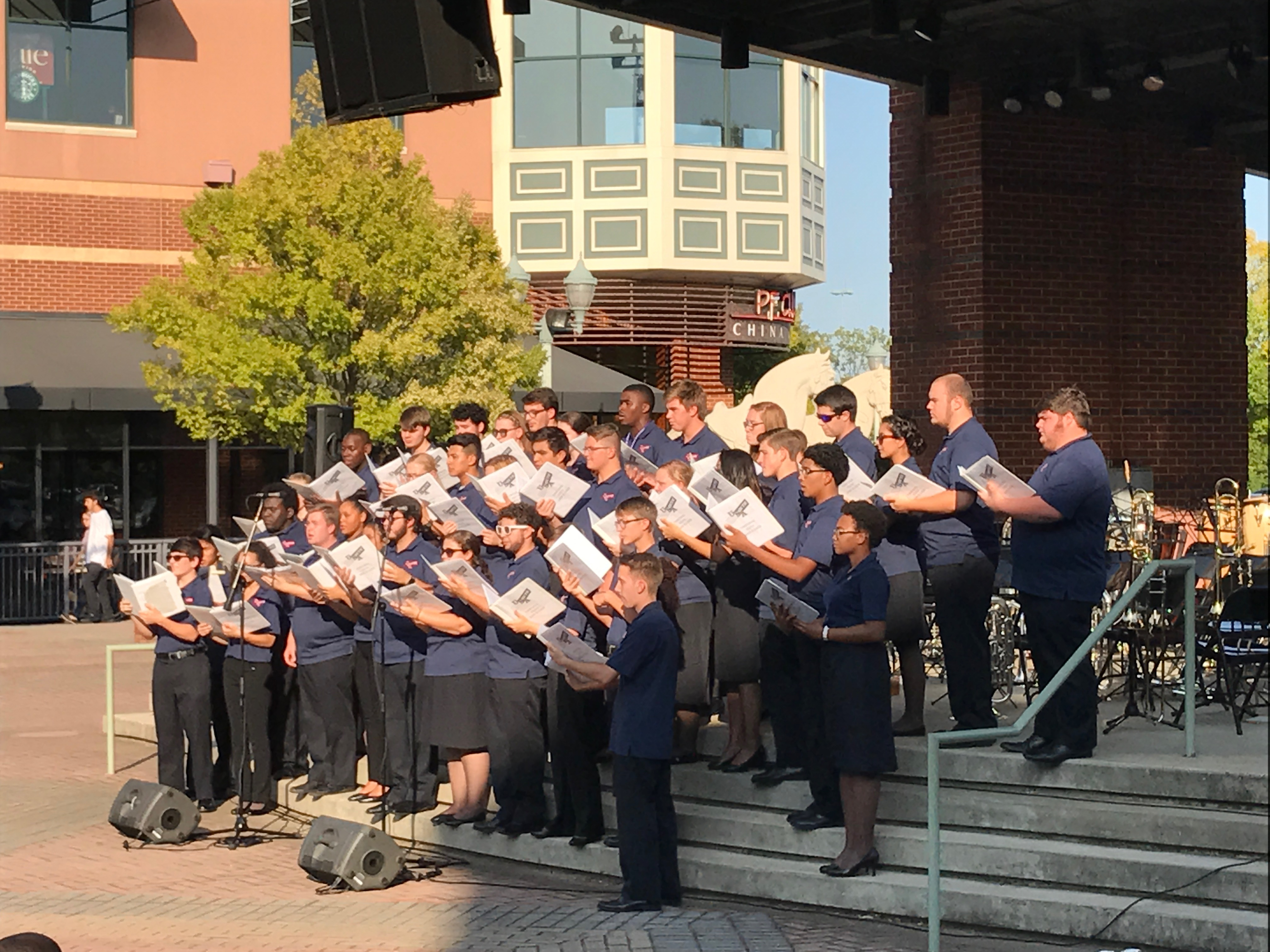
The USA Southern Territory Youth Choir singing in Atlanta, Georgia.

As the popularity of the organisation grew and Salvationists worked the streets of London attempting to convert individuals, they were sometimes confronted with unruly crowds. A family of musicians (the Frys, from Alderbury, Wiltshire) began working with the Army as their "bodyguards" and played music to distract the crowds. In 1891, a Salvation Army band attempted to parade and play music in Eastbourne, Sussex, England. This was in contravention of local by-laws and resulted in the arrest of nine Salvationists. Unperturbed the Army continued to parade in defiance of the law, with the aim of gathering support for a change in legislation. Over the next few months the situation in the town escalated to such an extent that there were riots, and mounted police had to be called in from surrounding areas to try to maintain order.

The tradition of having musicians available continued and eventually grew into standard brass bands. These are still seen in public at Army campaigns, and at other festivals, parades, and at Christmas. Across the world the brass band has been part of the Army's ministry and an immediately recognisable symbol to Salvationists and non-Salvationists alike. The Salvation Army also has choirs; these are known as Songster Brigades, normally comprising the traditional soprano, alto, tenor, and bass singers. The premier Songster Brigade in the Salvation Army is the International Staff Songsters (ISS). The standard of playing is high and the Army operates bands at the international level—such as the International Staff Band (a brass band), which is the equal of professional ensembles although it does not participate in the brass band contest scene—and territorial levels such as the New York Staff Band. Some professional brass players and contesting brass band personnel have Salvation Army backgrounds. Many Salvation Army corps have brass bands that play at Salvation Army meetings, although not all. The Salvation Army also fielded large concertina bands. From the turn of the (20th) century to the Second World War between a third and a half of all SA officers in Britain played concertina. For an evangelist, the concertina's portability, its ability to play both melody and chords, and most especially the fact that the player can sing or speak while playing, were all distinct advantages over brass instruments.

== Publications ==
The Salvation Army publishes books, magazines, and sheet music. Due to the way in which the Salvation Army is constituted, copyright of some Army publications is vested in the General of The Salvation Army, and not necessarily the original authors.

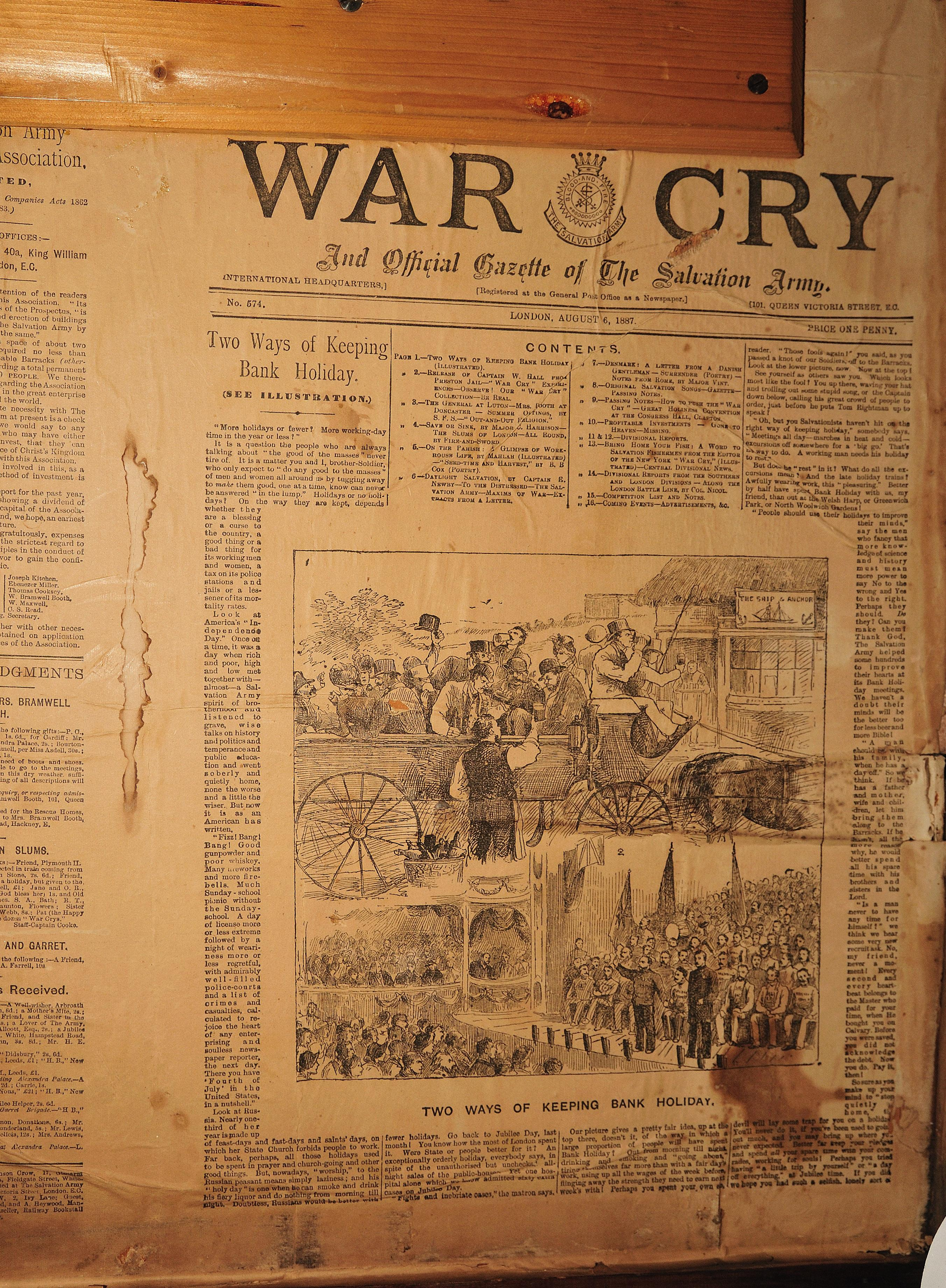
Edition of The War Cry, 6 August 1887

=== Books and magazines ===
- New Frontier Chronicle, news and networking for the Salvation Army
- Caring Magazine, curating conversation around issues of social concern
- The War Cry newspaper, first published in 1879 in the United Kingdom
- Faith and Friends magazine
- Salvationist magazine
- Word and Deed journal
- KidZone magazine
- Priority magazine
- Pipeline, The Salvation Army's news, features and opinion magazine AUE (discontinued)
- Onfire The Salvation Army's news, features and opinion magazine AUS (discontinued)
- Others The Salvation Army's news, features and opinion magazine (under newly unified Australian Territory)
- Adult And Family Ministries Songbook
- Kids Alive children's magazine
- Handbook of Doctrine
- Salvation Story (revised Handbook of Doctrine)
- The Salvation Army Yearbook 2018 (website page)
- Christian Mission Magazine
- Christian Mission Hymn Book
- Revive
- The Salvation Army Year Book 2018
- Songbook of The Salvation Army

== Public views ==
In 1994, The Chronicle of Philanthropy, an industry publication, released the results of the largest study of charitable and non-profit organisation popularity and credibility. The study showed that The Salvation Army was ranked as the fourth "most popular charity/non-profit in America" of over 100 charities researched, with 47% of Americans over the age of 12 choosing 'Love' and 'Like A Lot' for The Salvation Army.

== Honours ==
General Bramwell Booth instituted the Order of the Founder on 20 August 1917. The first awards were made in 1920 to one Soldier and 15 Officers. General George Carpenter founded the Order of Distinguished Auxiliary Service in 1941 to express the Salvation Army's gratitude for service given to the organisation by non-Salvationists.

== Controversies ==
=== Stance on LGBT rights ===
Because the Salvation Army is a church, Title VII of the U.S. Civil Rights Act of 1964 allows it to inquire into people's religious beliefs in its hiring practices. The Salvation Army states that it does not "discriminate against hiring gays and lesbians for the majority of its roughly 55,000 jobs", but has historically supported legislation that would allow it to deny employment and federally funded services to LGBT individuals.

In 1986, The Salvation Army campaigned throughout New Zealand against the Homosexual Law Reform Act 1986, which decriminalised homosexuality. In 2006, the Army released a statement regretting the ill feelings that persisted following its activity. It stated in part "We do understand though that The Salvation Army's official opposition to the Reform Bill was deeply hurtful to many, and are distressed that ill-feeling still troubles our relationship with segments of the gay community. We regret any hurt that may remain from that turbulent time and our present hope is to rebuild bridges of understanding and dialogue between our movement and the gay community."

In 1997, the city of San Francisco enacted a law requiring all companies doing business with the city government to extend domestic benefits to same-sex partners of employees. In refusing to do so, the Salvation Army declined a US$3.5 million contract. In 2001, the Salvation Army pressed the Bush Administration to exempt it and other religious groups from anti-discrimination legislation that it felt infringed on the organisation's religious freedoms. This request was denied, and was sharply rebuked by David Smith, then-spokesperson for the Human Rights Campaign. "Gays and lesbians are taxpayers, too," said Smith. "Their money should not be used by religious groups to fund discriminatory practices against them."

In February 2000, the Salvation Army in the United Kingdom publicly opposed the repeal of Section 28 of the Local Government Act 1988, which prevented local authorities from "intentionally promot[ing] homosexuality".

The Salvation Army Western Territory (one of four Salvation Army territories in the United States) approved a plan in October 2001 to start offering domestic partnership benefits to employees in same-sex relationships.

In 2004, the Salvation Army threatened that it would close operations in New York City unless it was exempted from a municipal ordinance requiring them to offer benefits to gay employees' partners, and the City Council refused to make the exemption. Mayor Michael R. Bloomberg's administration chose not to enforce the ordinance, and the organisation continued to operate there without interruption. The administration's right to decline to enforce the ordinance was upheld by the New York State Court of Appeals in 2006.

Between 2010 and 2013, a "position statement" with regard to "same-sex" "sexual orientations" was published on the Salvation Army's website:

Scripture forbids sexual intimacy between members of the same sex. The Salvation Army believes, therefore, that Christians whose sexual orientation is primarily or exclusively same-sex are called upon to embrace celibacy as a way of life. There is no scriptural support for same-sex unions as equal to, or as an alternative to, heterosexual marriage.

Likewise, there is no scriptural support for demeaning or mistreating anyone for reason of their sexual orientation. The Salvation Army opposes any such abuse.

In keeping with these convictions, the services of The Salvation Army are available to all who qualify, without regard to sexual orientation.

This position statement was deleted by June 2012, replaced by a statement that the organisation's position on homosexuality is under review.

On 15 December 2012, in Canada, Andrea Le Good noticed a Salvation Army bell-ringer carrying a sign reading "if you support gay rights: please do not donate." While the bell-ringer claimed he had permission from the charity to wear the sign, Salvation Army spokeswoman Kyla Ferns said that it had no part in the sign, and that the bell-ringer was pulled away immediately when the charity learned about it.

In November 2013, it was made known that the Salvation Army was referring LGBT individuals to one of several conversion therapy groups. As a response, the Salvation Army removed links to the conversion groups from their website.

In 2016, The Salvation Army withdrew support for an Australian safe schools program that focused on LGBT students, stating that "the provision of a government approved anti-bullying program needs to consider all high risk student groups."

In November 2019, according to The Dallas Morning News, "singer Ellie Goulding... threaten[ed] to cancel her performance at the [Dallas] Cowboys' Thanksgiving halftime show" (an entertainment interlude of a professional American football game) out of concern for "the LGBTQ community" following negative responses to an Instagram post that she made promoting the organisation:

"Upon researching this, I have reached out to The Salvation Army and said that I would have no choice but to pull out unless they very quickly make a solid, committed pledge or donation to the LGBTQ community," she wrote. "I am a committed philanthropist as you probably know, and my heart has always been in helping the homeless, but supporting an anti-LGBTQ charity is clearly not something I would ever intentionally do. Thank you for drawing my attention to this."

The show "serves as the kickoff for the Salvation Army's yearly Red Kettle Campaign". Goulding later opted to perform.

In 2019, 2020, and 2021, The Salvation Army continued to be criticized in publications like Vox, Forbes, and Out, for homophobic and transphobic views and practices expressed by its leaders and policies, such as in public statements and lobbying.

==== The Salvation Army's response ====
In 2013, a positional statement on the Salvation Army U.K. and Ireland site stated:

The Salvation Army teaches that sexual acts should take place only in a monogamous heterosexual marriage, believing that this reflects God's intentions for sexual behaviour and provides the best environment for raising children.

The statement was later taken down. As of 2013, the Salvation Army mission statement states:

The Salvation Army stands against homophobia, which victimises people and can reinforce feelings of alienation, loneliness and despair. We want to be an inclusive church community where members of the LGBT community find welcome and the encouragement to develop their relationship with God... Our international mission statement is very clear on this point when it says we will "meet human needs in [Jesus'] name without discrimination". Anyone who comes through our doors will be welcomed with love and service, based on their need and our capacity to provide.

The Salvation Army in the United Kingdom said that the positional statements from its Moral and Social Issues Council are intended for members of the Salvation Army and that "We do not expect the same level of adherence from non-members and do not condemn those who do not hold the same beliefs or exclude theme from attending our church services, working for us or receiving our support."

As of November 2013, activists were still calling on the Salvation Army to change its stance on LGBT issues, citing ongoing discrimination.

As of 2017, The Salvation Army's homeless shelter in downtown Las Vegas, Nevada, specifically seeks to house transgender people experiencing homelessness, recognizing them as more vulnerable to discrimination, abuse, and violence – factors that contribute to homelessness – than other unhoused people. Transgender people seeking shelter are housed in a dedicated safety dorm (colloquially called the "S-dorm").

As of April 2018, the "Inclusion" page on the official U.K. website stated that the Salvation Army stands against homophobia and does not permit discrimination in its employment practices or delivery of care.

As of 2018, the U.S.A. Central Territory website explicitly states that it serves and welcomes the LGBT community.

On the website of its USA division, the organisation previously published an informative/promotional document titled "The LGBTQ Community and The Salvation Army", which stated (among other things) that it was "committed to serving the LGBTQ community"; "[w]hen a transgender person seeks help from us, we serve them in the same manner as any other person seeking assistance"; it "is an Equal Opportunity Employer" with regard to "sexual orientation, gender identity, gender expression" (et al.); and that it "provide[s] benefits to the spouses of employees in same-sex marriages". By October 2025, this page had been removed and replaced by a redirect to a document titled "Commitment to Serving All", which contained no specific mention of the LGBTQ community.

=== Proselytising during government-funded social service in New York ===
In 2004, the Salvation Army's New York division was named in a lawsuit filed by 18 current and former employees of its social service arm, claiming that the organisation asked about the religious and sexual habits of employees in programs funded by local and state government. One member claimed the organisation forced them to agree "to preach the Gospel of Jesus Christ". Proselytising or otherwise pursuing religious motives in a government-funded program is generally considered a violation of the Establishment Clause of the U.S. Constitution. While the employment-discrimination portion of the lawsuit was dismissed in 2005, government agencies agreed in a 2010 settlement to set up monitoring systems to ensure that the Army did not violate church–state separation in its publicly funded projects. The organisation did not dispute allegations that nine-year-olds in a city-funded foster care program were put through a "confirmation-like" ceremony, where they were given Bibles and prayed over.

=== Australian sex abuse cases ===
From the 1940s to the 1980s the Salvation Army in Australia sheltered approximately 30,000 children. In 2006 the Australian division of the Salvation Army acknowledged that sexual abuse may have occurred during this time and issued an apology. In it, the Army explicitly rejected a claim, made by a party unnamed in the apology, that there were as many as 500 potential claimants.

In 2013 it was reported that private settlements totalling A$15.5 million had been made in Victoria relating to 474 abuse cases; a Salvation Army spokesman said that "This should not have happened and this was a breach of the trust placed in us" and that they were "deeply sorry" whilst claiming that the abuse was "the result of individuals and not a culture within the organisation".

In 2014, the Royal Commission into Institutional Responses to Child Sexual Abuse, a royal commission of inquiry initiated in 2013 by the Australian Government and supported by all of its state governments, began investigating abuse cases at the Alkira Salvation Army Home for Boys at Indooroopilly; the Riverview Training Farm (also known as Endeavour Training Farm) at Riverview – both in Queensland; the Bexley Boys' Home at Bexley; and the Gill Memorial Home at Goulburn – both in New South Wales. The investigation also examined the Salvation Army's processes in investigating, disciplining, removing, and transferring anyone accused of or found to have engaged in child sexual abuse in these homes. On 27 March 2014, the Royal Commission began investigating the handling by the Salvation Army (Eastern Territory) of claims of child sexual abuse between 1993 and 2014.

=== Kroc Centres ===
In 2004, the Army in the United States received a US$1.6 billion donation in the will of Joan B. Kroc, the third wife of former McDonald's CEO Ray Kroc. This donation was among the larger individual philanthropic gifts ever given to a single organisation. The donation came with certain restrictions, such as requiring the funds to be used on new rather than existing centers. As of 2023, 26 new centers were opened using these funds.

== In media ==
The Salvation Army is featured in many popular movies such as Guys and Dolls and Major Barbara. A book detailing over 500 films in which the Salvation Army appears or is mentioned was published in 2020 entitled The Salvation Army at the Movies.

The Salvation Army began producing silent films when they started their own film studio called The Limelight Department in 1892, which was the first in Australia. The original studio still stands today and is being preserved by the Salvation Army. One of the films was a documentary called Inauguration of the Australian Commonwealth. In the years between 1898 and 1909, The Limelight Department produced over 300 films and documented Australia's Federation Ceremonies in 1909.

== See also ==
- The Salvation Army in Australia
  - Limelight Department
  - The Salvation Army, Australia Eastern Territory
  - The Salvation Army, Australia Southern Territory
- The Salvation Army, Canada
- Booth University College
- Chalk Farm Salvation Army Band
- Chief of the Staff of The Salvation Army
- "Follow On" (hymn)
- Generals of The Salvation Army
- Maidenhead Citadel Band
- Salvation Army Team Emergency Radio Network
- Soldier in The Salvation Army
- The Salvation Army in Namibia
- The Salvation Army USA
  - Salvation Army Waiʻoli Tea Room
- World Vision
- Church Army
- Criminal Law Amendment Act 1885
- Salvation Army Boys Adventure Corps
- Army of the Lord (Romanian Eastern Orthodox renewal movement)

== Bibliography ==
- Cooper, David Paul. Notes on The Salvation Army: An East End History in Photographs.
- Eason, Andrew M. Roger J. Green, eds. (2012) Boundless Salvation: The Shorter Writings of William Booth. New York: Peter Lang.
- Eason, Andrew M. (2003) Women in God's Army: Gender and Equality in the Early Salvation Army. Waterloo: Wilfrid Laurier University Press. ISBN 0-88920-418-7.
- Milbank, Dana (10 July 2001). "Charity Cites Bush Help in Fight Against Hiring Gays: Salvation Army Wants Exemption From Laws". The Washington Post. p. A01.
- Merritt, Major John G. Historical Dictionary of The Salvation Army (Scarecrow Press, 2006).
- Ostling, Richard N. (15 December 2005). "The Salvation Army: A distinctive corps simultaneously expands and shrinks". Associated Press.
- Walker, Pamela J. (2001). Pulling the Devil's Kingdom Down: The Salvation Army in Victorian Britain. University of California Press. ISBN 0-520-22591-0.
- Winston, Diane (2000). Red-Hot and Righteous: The Urban Religion of the Salvation Army. Harvard University Press. ISBN 0-674-00396-9.
