= The Salvation Army in Namibia =

The Salvation Army has had a turbulent history in Namibia dating back to 1913 when Major Schaud set up the first corps in Walvis Bay. Little is known of this venture which is thought to have been brought to an end by the First World War after British South Africa declared war on the then German South-West Africa. In the 1920s Salvationist families kept an unofficial presence in the towns of Walvis Bay, Usakos and Tsumeb. By 1928, unofficial corps were also operating in Swakopmund and Windhoek. The Salvation Army officially returned to Namibia in 1931 with a corps being opened in the town of Usakos. The campaign ended in tragedy when Captain Claasen, the officer in charge of The Salvation Army in Namibia, was accidentally killed in Italy at the start of World War II.

On 3 January 2008, The Salvation Army returned for the second time after Major Lenah Jwili opened a new corps in the capital Windhoek. Namibia is now part of the Southern Africa Territory, which also oversees Salvation Army work in Lesotho, St Helena, South Africa and Swaziland. Currently The Salvation Army Namibia is led by Major Vukani and Captain Sindi Nkosi and predominantly serves the people in Windhoek.
