= Salvation Army Boys Adventure Corps =

SABAC (the Salvation Army Boys' Adventure Corps) is a venture set up by the Salvation Army in the United Kingdom and is the Salvation Army equivalent of the Boys' Brigade or the Church Lads' Brigade. Although SABAC was originally set up just for boys, they are now open to girls. As well as playing games, there is also badge work for the children to work towards.

The uniform consists of a blue shirt with the SABAC patch sewn onto it and blue jeans or smart trousers when on parade.

A similar organization in the United States is the Salvation Army's Adventure Corps.
