= Salvation Army Act 1963 =

Repealed United Kingdom legislation

- Act of Parliament
- Parliament of the United Kingdom
- Long title: An Act to establish a non-contributory pension fund for officers of the Salvation Army; to provide for the transfer to the fund of certain existing funds and for contributions to the fund from the general funds of the Salvation Army and from its associated charities and companies; to establish a board to administer the fund; to confer powers on the board to make rules determining the terms and conditions on which pensions are to be payable and to prescribe the first rules of the fund; and for other purposes.
- Citation: 1963 c. xciv
- Territorial extent: United Kingdom; Salvation Army operations outside of the United Kingdom

Dates
- Royal assent: 7 July 1963

Other legislation
- Amended by: Salvation Army Act 1980

Status: Amended

Text of statute as originally enacted

The Salvation Army Act 1963 (c. xciv) was an act of the Parliament of the United Kingdom that was passed in 1963. The legislation governed the International Headquarters of The Salvation Army until it was amended in 1968 and again in 1980. The legislation gained royal assent from Elizabeth II on 7 July 1963 and took immediate effect.

== Legislation ==
The Salvation Army Act 1963 established the "Salvation Army Officers Pension Fund." The act required the Salvation Army to fairly and faithfully pay pensions to retired officers or their widows. The act further establishes a board to administer the payment of pensions. But the legislation does not actually require the payment of pensions; it guarantees that the Salvation Army provides a trust and avenue for dispensing such payment. The act clarifies when an officer is eligible for pension and when such pension can be lawfully revoked. The act further facilitates financial transparency by requiring board members to prepare accounts for each financial year which give a true and fair view of the state of affairs of the fund for that period.

The act requires the Salvation Army to operate a non-contributory pension scheme, which ensures that employees are not responsible for adding to their pension fund. According to current Salvation Army policy, only officers who serve until retirement age are eligible for pension. For instance, an officer who resigns after ten years will receive no pension if the resignation is before the retirement date.

== See also ==
- Salvation Army Act 1931
- Salvation Army Act 1980
