= Salvation Army Act 1931 =

Repealed United Kingdom legislation

- Act of Parliament
- Parliament of the United Kingdom
- Long title: An Act to provide for the better organisation of the Salvation Army and for the custody of real and personal property held upon charitable trusts by or the administration whereof devolves upon the general of the Salvation Army and for other purposes.
- Citation: 21 & 22 Geo. 5. c. xciv
- Territorial extent: United Kingdom; Salvation Army operations outside of the United Kingdom

Dates
- Royal assent: 31 July 1931

Other legislation
- Amended by: Salvation Army Act 1963; Salvation Army Act 1980

Status: Amended

The Salvation Army Act 1931 (21 & 22 Geo. 5. c. xciv) was an act of the Parliament of the United Kingdom that was passed in 1931. Until it was amended in 1963 and again in 1980, the legislation governed the International Headquarters of The Salvation Army. The act limited and regulated the authority of the general of The Salvation Army, who serves as the organisation's chief executive officer (CEO), and removed his ability to act as the sole owner of Salvation Army trusts. The legislation gained royal assent from George V on 31 July 1931 and took immediate effect.

== History ==
By 1929, Bramwell Booth, General of The Salvation Army, had become ill, but refused to retire when asked by Salvation Army leaders. The first High Council was established by Bramwell Booth's predecessor William Booth, who was also the founder of the organisation. The first High Council convened to remove Bramwell Booth from office; the measure passed 52 to 5. Booth was succeeded in the election of Edward Higgins, his Chief of the Staff. Largely because of Bramwell Booth's refusal to resign, the Salvation Army Act 1931, passed by the parliament of the United Kingdom, removed the general's ability to choose his successor. The Salvation Army Act 1931 was amended by the Salvation Army Act 1963 and again by the Salvation Army Act 1980.

== Legislation ==
The original purpose of the legislation was, according to Parliament, to "provide for the better organisation of The Salvation Army and for the custody of real and personal property held upon charitable trusts by or the administration whereof devolves upon the General of the Salvation Army and for other purposes."

The Salvation Army Act 1931:

- Removed power of the General of The Salvation Army to nominate his successor. The act required that every future general is elected by the High Council of The Salvation Army. The Act states that any person could be elected general; the Salvation Army Act 1980 limited who could be elected general to Salvation Army officers.
- Established a retiring age for the general of 68 years old
- Removed from the general the sole trusteeship of the property of the Salvation Army and other trust property and to form a trustee company to hold the trust's properties
- Established an internal Board of Arbitration (composed of senior officers) to determine certain differences, misunderstandings or grievances if any such arise between the General and certain senior officers
- Provided regulation for a pension fund for retired Salvation Army officers and their spouses.

== See also ==
- Salvation Army Act 1963
- Salvation Army Act 1980
