= Skeleton Army =

Armed formation in 19th-century UK

Members of the Salvation Army being pursued by the Skeleton Army with its distinctive skull and crossbones banner c. 1882

The Skeleton Army was a diffuse group from Weston-super-Mare, active particularly in Southern England, that opposed and disrupted The Salvation Army's marches against alcohol in the late 19th century and best known for an attack in Bethnal Green in London. Clashes between the two groups led to the deaths of several Salvationists and injuries to many others.

== Origins ==
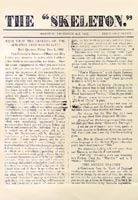
The "Skeleton", a Skeleton Army gazette

The earliest reference to an organised opposition to The Salvation Army was in August 1880 in Whitechapel, when The Unconverted Salvation Army was founded with its flag and motto of "Be just and fear not".

In 1881, Skeleton Armies were raised in Whitechapel, Exeter and Weston-super-Mare, and the name was quickly taken up elsewhere as other groups were formed in the south of England; there are no records of Skeleton Armies north of London. Membership was predominantly lower to middle working-class.

In 'Blood on the Flag', Major Nigel Bovey identifies 21 towns and cities that are north of London -- three in Scotland -- in which the Skeleton Army opposed The Salvation Army.

The "Skeletons" recognised each other by various insignia used to distinguish themselves. Skeletons used banners with skulls and crossbones; sometimes there were two coffins and a statement like, "Blood and Thunder" (mocking the Salvation Army's war cry "Blood and Fire") or the three Bs: "Beef", "Beer" and "Bacca" – again mocking the Salvation Army's three S's – "Soup", "Soap" and "Salvation". Banners also had pictures of monkeys, rats and the devil. Skeletons further published so-called "gazettes" considered libellous as well as obscene and blasphemous.

Several techniques were employed by the "Skeletons" to disrupt Salvation Army meetings and marches; these included throwing rocks and dead rats, marching while loudly playing musical instruments or shouting, and physically assaulting Salvation Army members at their meetings.

== Confrontation ==
Although George Scott Railton, second in command of the Salvation Army, claimed the Skeleton Army first started in Weston-super-Mare in 1881, contemporary press reports show that it first appeared in Exeter in October 1881. In Weston-super-Mare, in March 1882 Captain William Beatty, Thomas Bowden and William Mullins were given a three-month prison sentence by the magistrates for a breach of the peace when they broke a local ban on processions.

This led to the case of Beatty v Gillbanks (1882), which held that the Salvation Army was acting lawfully when marching, despite knowing that their assembly could well lead to riots. As their intentions were ultimately peaceful and unrelated to the cause of inciting riot, the court found their actions to be within the limits of the law. That it was known that their marching may cause riots was not found to be a breach of the law, as it was the actions of antagonistic parties including the Skeleton Army which led directly to the riotous behaviour. The convictions against Beatty and the two other Salvationists were later quashed by the High Court and costs were awarded against the sentencing magistrates.

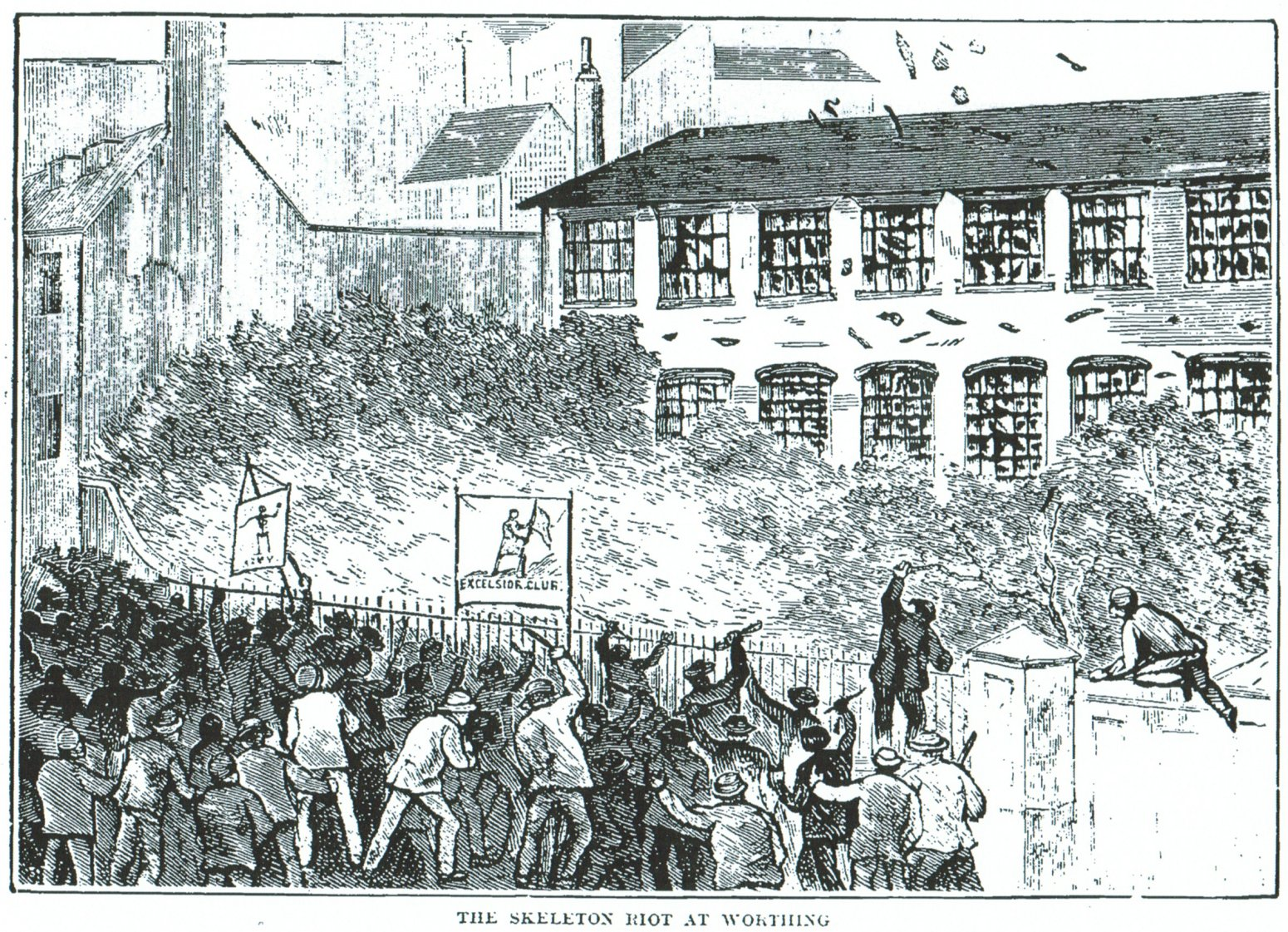
The Skeleton Army rioting in Worthing in 1884

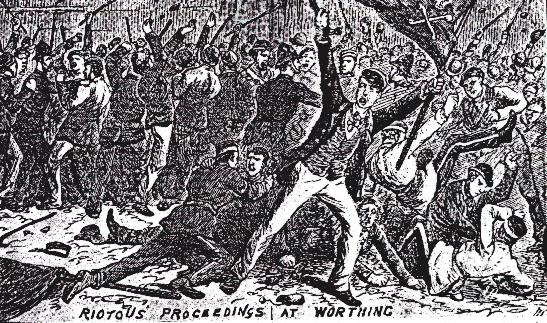
The Skeleton Army at Worthing in 1884

The action was reported by The Times; at the appeal hearing it was erroneously stated that the Skeleton Army was founded in Weston-super-Mare.

Of an attack in Bethnal Green in November 1882 the Bethnal Green Eastern Post stated:

A genuine rabble of 'roughs' pure and unadulterated has been infesting the district for several weeks past. These vagabonds style themselves the 'Skeleton Army'.... The 'skeletons' have their collectors and their collecting sheets and one of them was thrust into my hands... it contained a number shopkeepers' names... I found that publicans, beer sellers and butchers are subscribing to this imposture... the collector told me that the object of the Skeleton Army was to put down the Salvationists by following them about everywhere, by beating a drum and burlesquing their songs, to render the conduct of their processions and services impossible... Amongst the Skeleton rabble there is a large percentage of the most consummate loafers and unmitigated blackguards London can produce...worthy of the disreputable class of publicans who hate the London School Board, education and temperance and who, seeing the beginning of the end of their immoral traffic, and prepared for the most desperate enterprise.

Both sources agree Salvationists were pelted with missiles. At Bethnal Green, such items as flour, rotten eggs, stones and brickbats were among those used, and many Salvationists were manhandled and beaten. When news of trouble in London spread, Skeleton riots took place in other parts of Britain.

For example, when in April 1884 the owner of an alcohol shop in Worthing objected to Salvation Army criticism concerning the selling of alcoholic beverages, 4,000 "Skeletons" joined in that town in direct opposition to the Salvationists. Black, sticky tar was painted onto the wall of the alley which the entrance to the Salvation Army barracks shared with the alcohol shop. This damaged Salvation Army uniforms as they marched through it. Also eggs filled with blue paint were thrown at the "Sally Army". Many in Worthing approved of these confrontational activities, but the Salvation Army continued unabated.

Captain Ada Smith led those who faced the "Skeletons" in Worthing. General Booth requested police protection for the Salvation Army in that town and ordered Captain Smith and her soldiers to remain in their barracks until they got it. However, the Home Secretary, Sir William Harcourt, said it was outside his jurisdiction to offer such protection. Finally General Booth ordered Captain Smith and her group to march on Sundays unprotected by the authorities.

On Sunday, 17 August 1884, the police, the Salvation Army and the Skeletons confronted each other in Worthing. For an hour the police kept the peace, then the Skeletons rioted. The area was filled with screaming men, brick dust and broken glass. The Salvationists returned to their "barracks" and the Skeletons tried to burn it down. The landlord of the barracks, George Head, a Salvation Army supporter, defended his property and the people there with a revolver, wounding several Skeletons. Head was later brought before the magistrates on a charge of feloniously and maliciously wounding a young man named Olliver.

The Metropolitan Police were at first unhelpful. The Metropolitan Police Commissioner, Sir Edmund Henderson denied what happened. The public eventually demanded action and Skeleton riots in London were belatedly put down.

== Final stages ==
Skeleton riots continued elsewhere until 1893 when they faded out. In 1889, at least 669 Salvation Army members were assaulted, including 251 women. On one occasion, while defending themselves, 86 Salvation Army members were arrested and imprisoned on disorderly conduct charges. When a new Salvation Army Corps was opened in Potton in Bedfordshire on 1 June 1890, large contingents of the Skeleton Army made fun of the local Salvationists. The War Cry reported:

... the skeletons did all the shouting and we had only the opportunity of blessing them by showing unruffled love in answer to the disturbance in our proceedings"...."The skeleton flag was out with its coffin, skull and cross-bones as well as the whole Skeleton force, uniformed, beating a drum, playing flutes, whirling rattles and screaming through trumpets. One of their chosen leaders was carried shoulder high, ringing a bell and attired in an untrimmed coal-scuttle bonnet. I noticed that the publicans looked pleased to see this array and several waved their hats. But we were good friends of the skeletons, twelve of whom sat at our tea table... Their leaders were very courteous and sincerely desirous of keeping their somewhat rabble followers within bounds. Almost implicit obedience was given them. Their skeleton War Cry was freely sold, but doesn't quite beat the original.

In 'Blood on the Flag', Major Nigel Bovey states that there is no contemporary evidence for a Salvationist being killed directly by a member of the Skeleton Army. He records that Captain Sarah Jane Broadhurst was hit during an attack by the Skeletons in Shoreham on Sunday 12 October 1884. The captain died on 6 February 1892, some eight years later.

The mayor of Eastbourne stated he would, "put down this Salvation Army business" with help from the Skeleton Army if necessary. Skeletons attacked many Salvationists. Salvationists considered it incompatible with Christian principles to defend themselves but thought the police should protect them.

== Skeleton to Salvationist ==
Charles Jeffries was a 'lieutenant' in the Skeleton Army in Whitechapel in 1881, and was well known for disrupting Salvation Army public meetings and on occasion had assaulted Salvation Army Soldiers and Officers. Then Jeffries was proselytised and started to attend a Salvation Army corps, soon becoming an active Soldier, and then after attending training college, became an Officer. He served in many countries including China and Australia and eventually rose to the rank of Commissioner, serving as the head of corps work as British Commissioner in the 1930s. A two-person off-Broadway musical created by Neil Leduke was written in 2019 by John Copeland and Len Ballantine about Charles Jeffries' dramatic transformation.
