= Promoted to Glory =

Promoted to Glory is a term used by The Salvation Army to describe the death of a born again Christian.

== Terminology and background ==
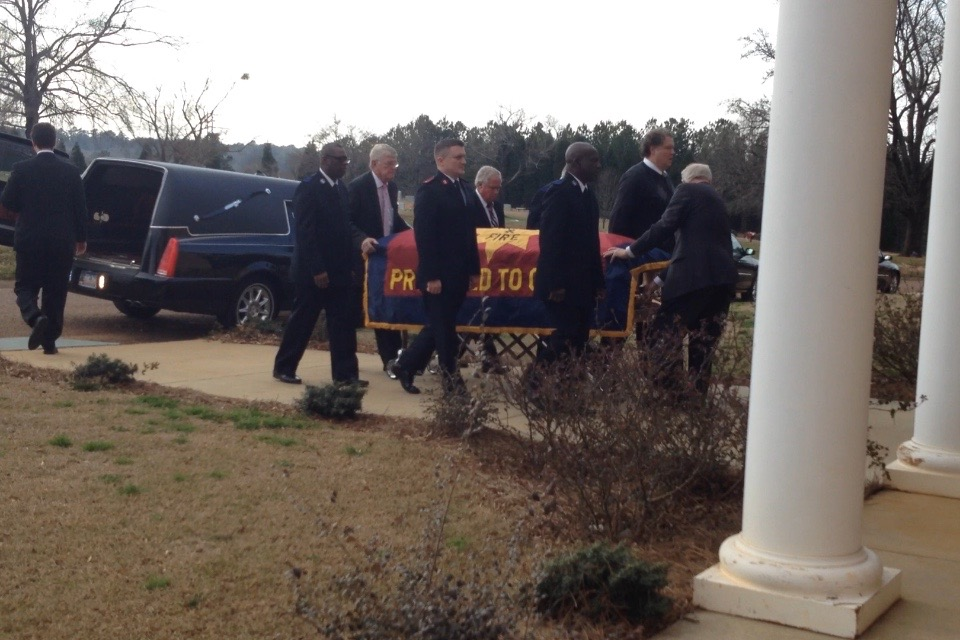
A casket with the "Promoted to Glory" flag draped over the top

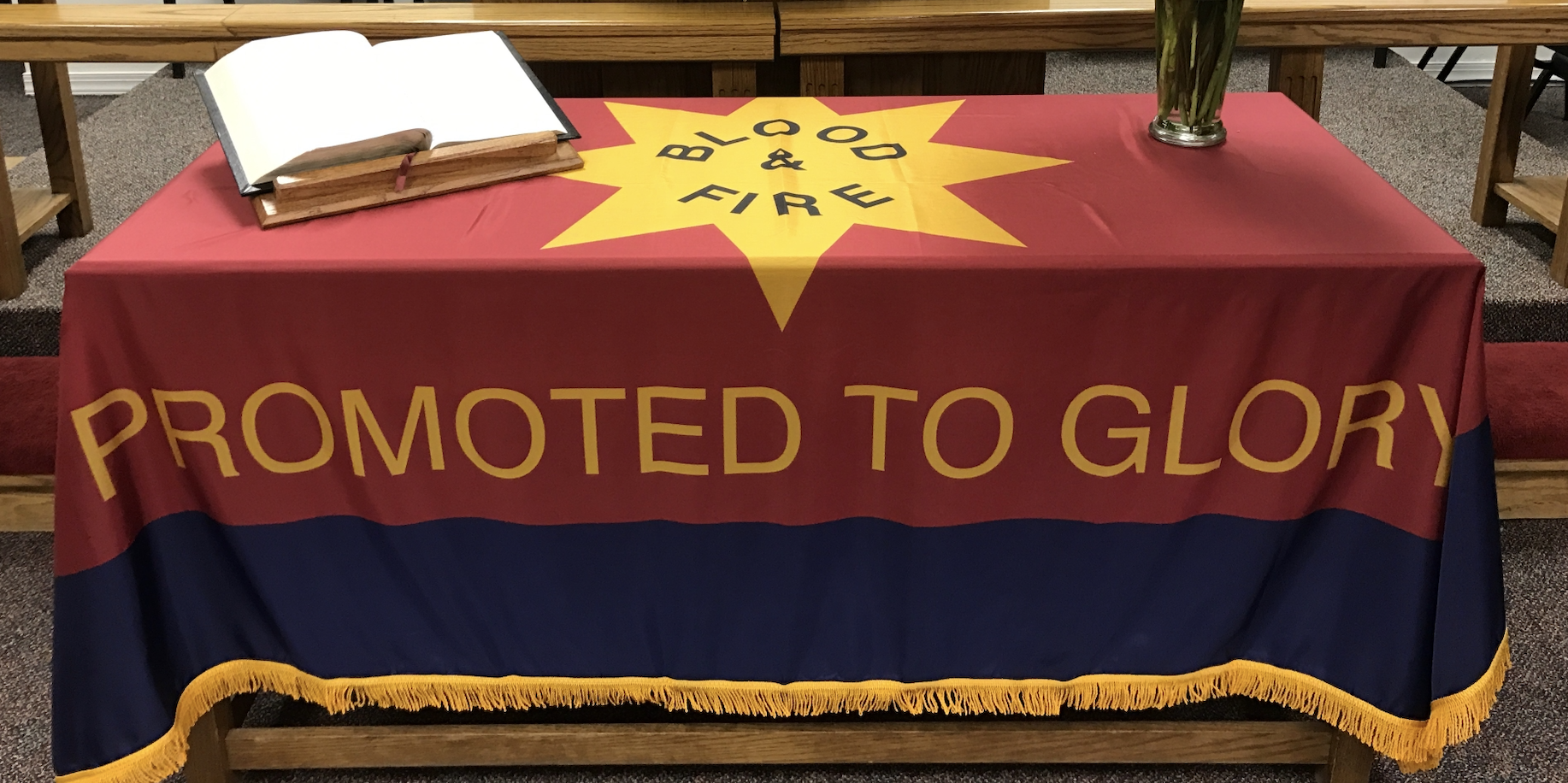
Promoted to Glory flag (Salvation Army)

The phrase is used as TSA believe that, for a Christian, the end of life on this earth is a promotion into the presence of God.

The earliest printed usage of the term seems to be in the December 14, 1882 issue of The War Cry, which included death announcements with headlines such as 'Promotion of Sister Muxlow from Earth to Heaven' and 'Private Rudd goes to Glory from the Open-air.' Another report two days later was headed 'Promotion from Cheltenham to Glory'.

Some Salvation Army corps have a Promoted to Glory Board or ledger on which all members (soldiers or Adherents) of that corps, who have died, are listed along with the year of their death. The Salvation Army flag may be draped over the coffin.

The term Promoted to Glory was coined by Herbert Booth, son of the Founder William Booth, following the death of Catherine Booth, the Mother of the Salvation Army. He wrote the song "Promoted to Glory" which is still used at funerals today.

Words & Music: Herbert H. Booth, in Songs of Peace and War, 1890 (MIDI, score). Booth wrote this song while preparing for his mother's funeral.

== Song ==
Summoned home, the call has sounded,

Bidding a soldier his warfare cease;

And the song of angels resounded,

Welcomes a warrior to eternal peace.

Praise the Lord! from earthly struggles

A comrade has found release.

Death has lost its sting, the grave its victory;

Conflicts and dangers are over;

See him honored in the throne of glory,

Crowned by the hand of Jehovah!

Strife and sorrow over,

The Lord's true faithful soldier

Has been called to go from the ranks below,

To the conq’ring host above.

Once the sword, but now the scepter,

Once the fight, now the rest and fame,

Broken every earthly fetter,

Now the glory for the cross and shame;

Once the loss of all for Jesus,

But now the eternal gain.

Trials and sorrow here have found their meaning

Mysteries their explanation;

Safe, forever in the sunlight gleaming

Of His eternal salvation.

Salvation Army funerals are typically upbeat and are a celebration of the words "Servant of Christ, well done!"
