= Charles Jeffries =

Salvation Army clergy

- Commissioner Charles Jeffries
- Born: 1864; Shadwell, London, England
- Died: 1 February 1936; Orlando, Florida, U.S.

Commissioner Charles Henry Jeffries (1864 – 1 February 1936) was a British pioneer Salvationist and notable convert, after he left the Skeleton Army and attained the third highest rank possible as an Officer in The Salvation Army.

He was the grandfather of actor and director Lionel Jeffries.

== 'Skeleton' leader ==
Jeffries as a 'Skeleton' in 1881

Jeffries was born in Shadwell in London in 1864, the son of Emma (née Petty) (born 1838) and William Jeffries (1832–1870), a mariner, who married in 1859 at Christ Church in Tower Hamlets.

Employed by a firm of tobacconists, from 1881 the 16-year-old Charles Jeffries was the second-in-command of a Whitechapel branch of the Skeleton Army and was well known for disrupting Salvation Army public meetings and on occasion had assaulted Salvation Army Soldiers and Officers. The 'Skeleton Army' adopted the tunes of The Salvation Army, but altered their words, and wore cap bands on their hats reading 'Skeleton Army'.

'Skeletons' used banners with skulls and crossbones; sometimes there were two coffins and a statement like, “Blood and Thunder” (mocking the Salvation Army's war cry "Blood and Fire") or the three Bs: “Beef”, “Beer” and “Bacca” - again mocking the Salvation Army's three S's - "Soup", "Soap" and "Salvation". Banners also had pictures of monkeys, rats and devil. They paraded the streets and conducted meetings loudly within earshot of those of the Salvationists, usually causing the Salvation Army's meetings to end in a riot.

Colonel George Holmes of The Salvation Army, who was a boy Salvationist in 1881, later recalled:

"It was very rough. I remember attending an Open-Air Meeting one Sunday night outside 'The Blind Beggar.' Afterwards we marched to our Hall in Whitechapel Road. The 'skeletons', directed by Jeffries, headed our procession, proceeding at a snail's pace and compelling us to do so. Thus handicapped, we were jostled and pelted with decayed fruit and mud. I was only a boy, and for safety was placed in the middle of the ranks.

An enthusiastic Salvationist in our front rank wore a high hat with a Salvation Army band round the crown. Slipping behind him, Jeffries leapt upon his shoulders and deftly pushed the high hat over his eyes, whilst wriggling into the desired position. Then, using the top hat as a drum and his legs as a goad, he 'drove' his victim in the procession to the Hall. The Salvationists could have dismounted Jeffries only by rolling their comrade in the mud."

== Conversion ==
Jeffries was proselytized with between 20 and 30 other 'Skeletons' at a meeting they had come to disrupt in Whitechapel; after his conversion he started to attend a Salvation Army corps, soon becoming an active Soldier. He and the other former 'Skeletons' quickly became the object of attack from their old colleagues. Jeffries wrote in his diary:

"In the Open-Airs my old mates gave me many a blow and kick - but I stuck fast. At times they would follow me home singing, 'Jeffries will help to roll the old chariot along' - and, thank God, I am doing it."

In late 1882 Jeffries attended training college, and became an Officer. In March 1883 he was promoted to Lieutenant and was sent to Penzance where in seven months he made 300 converts. During this period Jeffries was summoned before the magistrates five times for preaching in the streets. Promoted to Captain, he was sent to St Blazey and then to Devonport, at both of which he made conversions.

He was among the first Salvation Army officers to arrive in Australia, landing in Sydney in August 1884, and where he was Social Secretary for a period. He was imprisoned in Sydney in 1889 for seven days with seven other Salvationists for preaching in the open. By now promoted to Adjutant, when he left Australia in March 1897 he had promoted the work of The Salvation Army by opening twelve new corps, established Rescue Homes and commenced Social Work in Adelaide and Melbourne, and had also married Captain Martha Harris and had four children. In October 1899 Jeffries was appointed Provincial Commander for Wales. In January 1900 he was at the London Headquarters discussing his plans for evangelizing the Welsh-speaking people of Wales. In December 1901 he was appointed Provincial Commander for the North West of England.

In 1907 Colonel Jeffries was appointed Assistant Field Secretary at the National Headquarters in London, and in 1911 became Field Secretary, making him responsible for appointing and promoting some 2,000 Corps Officers. Jeffries served in China from February 1918 until April 1919, when General Bramwell Booth summoned him back to London where he was appointed Commissioner.

== Commissioner ==
In January 1922 Jeffries was appointed as Principal of the International Training College at Clapton, a post he held for nine and a half years. Here he was responsible for the training of between four and five hundred Cadets a year.

General Erik Wickberg later recalled Jeffries:

"We were 500 Cadets in my Session. Our Training Principal was Commissioner Charles Jeffries. But we did not see much of him except in big meetings and lectures. He had opened our work in China, and he loved China. He often spoke about that great country. But it impressed us more to learn that he had been the leader of the "Skeleton Army" that fought William Booth and his Salvation Army on the streets of Whitechapel. Until he was converted and became a Salvationist himself. He was a 'he-man', a quick-witted Londoner, a man of few words, always to the point, who could preach about hell-fire and the tail of the devil, so that we seemed to smell sulphur and brimstone!

"Towards the end of the Session nearly all the men had had an interview with the Principal – but not I. I had almost given up hope of being called. Then one day, after a lecture at Mildmay, I was called. But not into an office. The Commissioner was just ready to leave - putting on his coat. "How are you, Wickberg?" he asked. "What do you read?" - What a question I thought – and then I said: "I read the Bible and Orders and Regulations."

""Of course, you do," said the Commissioner, "what else?"

"Again I thought: 'What a question!' But then I took courage and said: "Well, there isn't much time here to read much else." I shall never forget his reaction. He grabbed me with one hand, looked straight into my eyes and said: "Wickberg, if you are going to do the work of a Salvation Army Officer as you should, you will never have more time than you have here." This he said and departed. But I never forgot it."

He was British Commissioner from 1931 to 1935, making him responsible for The Salvation Army's evangelical work in the United Kingdom. Jeffries was one of the seven Commissioners that called for the first Salvation Army High Council and was notably involved in the controversy that surrounded the Council's vote that Bramwell Booth should be removed as General of The Salvation Army.

He married his Australian wife, Captain Martha Harris (1866–1933) in 1889, and with her had seven children: Arthur Jeffries (1890 –); Alice Jeffries (1891 –); Howard Jeffries (1893 –); Henry Charles Jeffries (1895–1976); Bernard Jeffries (1899 –); Ernest Jeffries (1900 –), and Eveline Irene Jeffries (1902–1982).

Jeffries retired from active service at the end of 1935. However, he continued to travel extensively on behalf of The Salvation Army, preaching the Gospel throughout the United States and Canada. At the time of his death in the Orange General Hospital in Orlando in Florida he had been preaching across the United States despite feeling unwell and was preparing to return to Australia to lead the Congress there.
