= Harry Read (Salvationist) =

Former British soldier and Salvation Army officer (1924–2021)

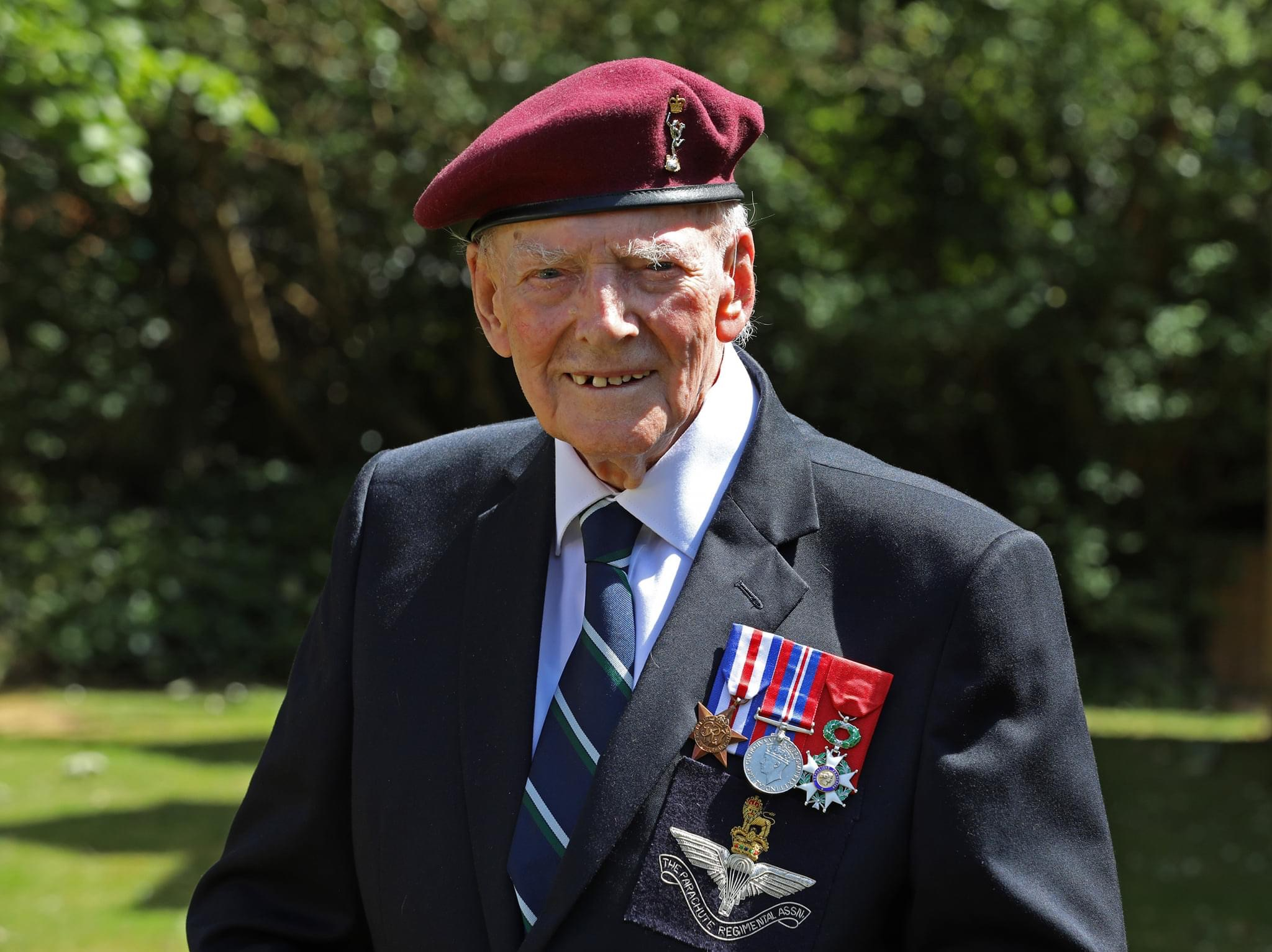
Commissioner Harry Read in 2017.

Harry Read OF, ChLH (17 May 1924 – 14 December 2021), was a soldier in The Parachute Regiment in the British Army during World War II who ended his life as a Commissioner in the Salvation Army, the second highest rank attainable by Officers in the organisation. He also served as the Territorial Commander of East Australia and was Chief Secretary for the Salvation Army in Canada.

== Early life ==
Read was born on 17 May 1924 into a Salvation Army family. His grandfather George Read (1838–1924) was an early member of the Salvation Army having been converted in Hartlepool under the ministry of evangelist James Dowdle (1840-1900), the 'saved railway guard', who had been sent by General William Booth to the north of England to "win converts and open Mission Stations." Read's father (1895–1943) was a Corps Sergeant Major in the Salvation Army. His mother had been a convert into the ranks of the Salvation Army during her teenage years.

As a youth Read joined the Salvation Army's Singing Company and YP Band, but he developed leanings towards the Methodist Church. Reluctantly, his parents allowed him to leave the Salvation Army in order to join the Methodist Church. Read had a conversion experience in 1939, just after the start of World War II, becoming a Methodist Local Preacher. In 1940 aged 16 he became a 'Local Preacher on note', meaning he was mentored by an older and more experienced Local Preacher whom he would accompany and assist during his Sunday preaching engagements.

== Wartime service ==
During World War II, Read volunteered for military service with the British Army in 1942 aged 18. His father, a veteran of World War I had refused to sign his enlistment papers before that date. By 1944 Read was a 20-year-old Royal Corps of Signals wireless operator. Serving as a member of the 3rd Parachute Brigade of the 6th Airborne Division from 1943, he jumped into Normandy on D-Day in June 1944. A parachuting injury prevented Read from undertaking further jumps and he was returned to an ordinary Signals unit.

In June 1947 Read was demobilised from the British Army on the completion of his military service and, rediscovering his enthusiasm for the Salvation Army, in August 1947 he entered the Kings Messengers Session of Cadets at the International Training College in London. On receiving his commission he served in several British corps and divisional appointments and was on the staff at the International Training College and was Principal from 1978-81. Read was to serve as an Officer in the Salvation Army for the rest of his life, rising to the rank of Commissioner. In addition to being a passionate Salvationist Read was also a family man; in 1950 he married Salvationist Winifred née Humphries (1924-2007) with whom he had two children, John and Margaret, in addition to four grandchildren, 11 great-grandchildren and three great-great grandchildren.

== Later life and death ==
In 2016, Read was awarded the Chevalier of the Légion d'Honneur for his part in the liberation of France in June 1944; while in July 2019 he was awarded The Salvation Army's most prestigious honour – the Order of the Founder.

In 2019, aged 95, Read completed a tandem parachute jump with the Parachute Regiment's Red Devils Display Team, landing safely on the same Drop Zone as he had done during World War II exactly 75 years earlier.

Read died at his home in Bournemouth on 14 December 2021, at the age of 97. On his death Commissioner of the Salvation Army Anthony Cotterill said of Read: "The Salvation Army and its worldwide ministry have been enriched beyond words by the remarkable service of Commissioner Harry Read. A bold, caring and innovative leader who challenged us all to be brave and to dare greater things for Jesus Christ. His legacy of poems and songs is a treasure trove of inspiration and insight that will continue to help us in the days ahead."
