= Ridsdel =

Ridsdel is a surname. Notable people with the surname include:

- John Ridsdel (1947–2016), English-born Canadian businessman and journalist
- William Ridsdel (1844–1931), Swedish Salvation Army officer
