= Foulden, Norfolk =

Village in Norfolk, England

Coordinates: 52.559°N 0.602°E

Foulden
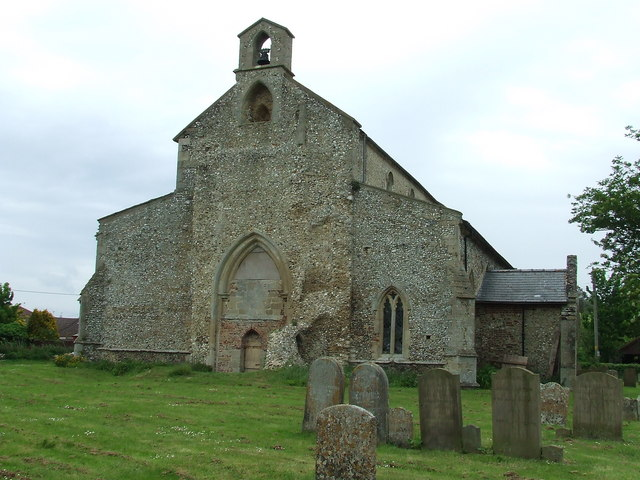
- All Saints' Church, Foulden

- Location within Norfolk
- Area: 5.00 sq mi (12.9 km^{2})
- Population: 441 (2021 census)
  - Density: 88/sq mi (34/km^{2})
- OS grid reference: TL764988
  - London: 79 miles (127 km)
- Civil parish: Foulden
- District: Breckland
- Shire county: Norfolk
- Region: East
- Country: England
- Sovereign state: United Kingdom
- Post town: THETFORD
- Postcode district: IP26
- Dialling code: 01366
- Police: Norfolk
- Fire: Norfolk
- Ambulance: East of England
- UK Parliament: South West Norfolk

Foulden (/ˈfaʊldən/) is a village and civil parish in the English county of Norfolk. It is 12 miles (19 km) north-west of Thetford and 29 miles (47 km) west of Norwich, along the River Wissey and includes the hamlet of Beckett End.

Foulden is part of the electoral ward of Bedingfield for local elections and is part of the district of Breckland. It is part of the South West Norfolk parliamentary constituency.

== History ==
Foulden's name is of Anglo-Saxon origin. In the Domesday Book, it is listed as a settlement of 64 households located in the hundred of South Greenhoe. In 1086, the village was divided between the East Anglian estates of Alan of Brittany, William de Warenne and Walter Giffard.

Foulden Hall is a 16th-century moated manor house located within the parish boundaries. The house was updated with a Victorian facade in the Nineteenth Century.

== Geography ==
According to the 2021 census, Foulden has a population of 441 people which shows an increase from the 430 people recorded in the 2011 census.

The River Wissey runs roughly west to east through the parish and the modern village sits overlooking the valley. Around the river some areas of fen (known as Borough Fen) survive and Foulden Common, a Site of Special Scientific Interest, is a large expanse of land in the north of the parish. Some of the parish is now planted with conifers and is part of Thetford Forest, managed by the Forestry Commission.

== All Saints' church ==
Foulden's parish church dates from the Fourteenth Century and is located within the village on School Road. The church has been Grade I listed since 1960. The church tower collapsed in the 18th-century. Today, the church is still in the care of the Diocese of Norwich but does not hold regular church services.

== Notable people ==
- John Lawley (1859–1922): commissioner of the Salvation Army, born in Foulden
- John Robert Osborn (1899–1941): Canadian soldier and recipient of the Victoria Cross, born in Foulden
