= Talywain =

Coordinates: 51.731°N 3.069°W

Talywain (Welsh: Talywaun) is situated in Garndiffaith, Abersychan and Pentwyn in Torfaen in south east Wales, within the historic boundaries of Monmouthshire.

== Old mining area ==
It is a semi rural area that has a long heritage in coal mining. The old British Coal mining (the NCB or British Coal) site was a source of income and work for many of the local settlers and attracted people from far and wide with the chance of a stable job and living.

== Education ==
Abersychan Comprehensive School (Welsh: Ysgol Gyfun Abersychan) is a state-funded and non-selective comprehensive school. It is built on the site of Abersychan Grammar School, and incorporates some of the old school buildings.

The former British School was demolished in the 1990s and a housing association development was built on the site.

== Valleys community ==
Talywain has hilltop views with beautiful surrounding scenery. Historically home to heavy industry the village had a network of railway lines that served the local coal mines and ironworks. The area has been in decline over the decades and is considered a dormitory suburb with very few amenities locally.

== Sporting traditions ==
Talywain also has its own rugby and football clubs along with a soon to be 18 hole Golf Course and golf driving range. Talywain's own football club and team is Fairfield F.C, The team has been running for well over 30 years. Talywain Rugby Club are the local rugby union club and has seen some of their players going on to play for Pontypool RFC.

== People ==
Mother Shepherd was born here in 1836.
