= James Dowdle =

English commissioner (1840–1900)

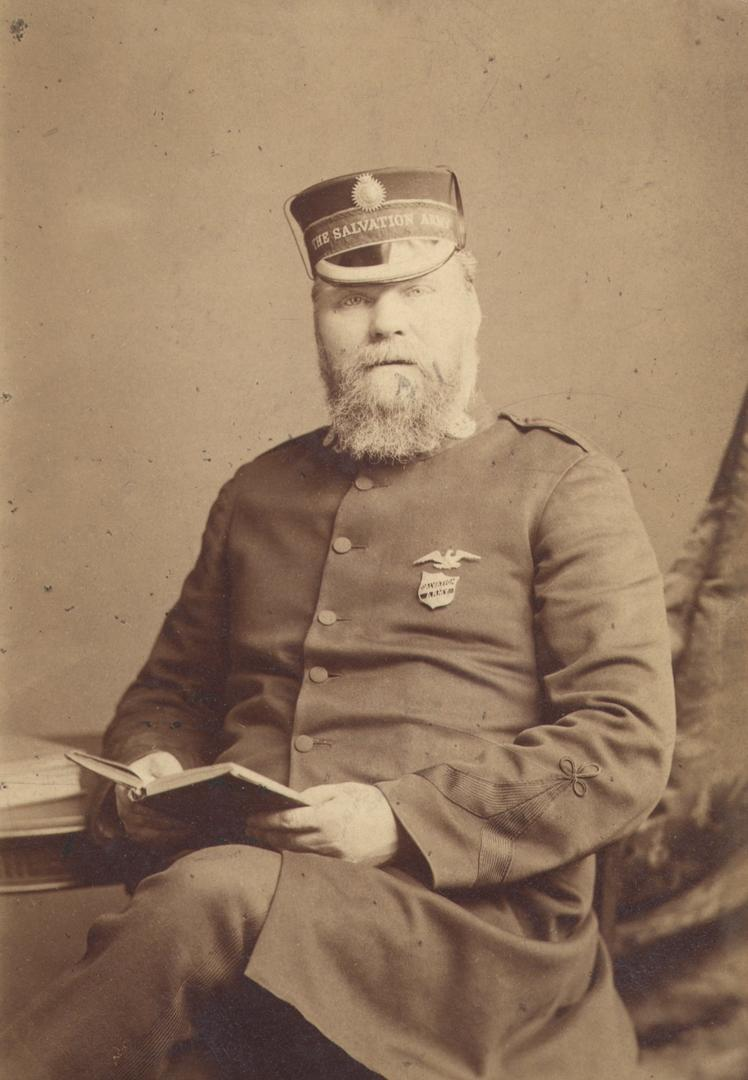
Commissioner James Dowdle

James John Dowdle (20 December 1840–21 July 1900) was a Commissioner in the Salvation Army known as the "Fiery Fiddler" and the "Saved Railway Guard". He was the first Salvation Army Commissioner to be Promoted to Glory.

== Early life ==
Dowdle was born in a two-room cottage in Upton Lovell in Wiltshire in 1840, the youngest of two children of woollen factory worker Priscilla née Hinton (1820-1898) and Henry Dowdle (1815-1868), an agricultural labourer. A big and mischievous youth who "loved a scrap", he left school aged 12 to train as a wheelwright under an uncle, but did not find the work to his taste. He next tried farm work, but found he liked that even less, so he moved to London where he worked in a goods yard for the Great Western Railway, then in 1861 as a porter before quickly working his way up to guard.

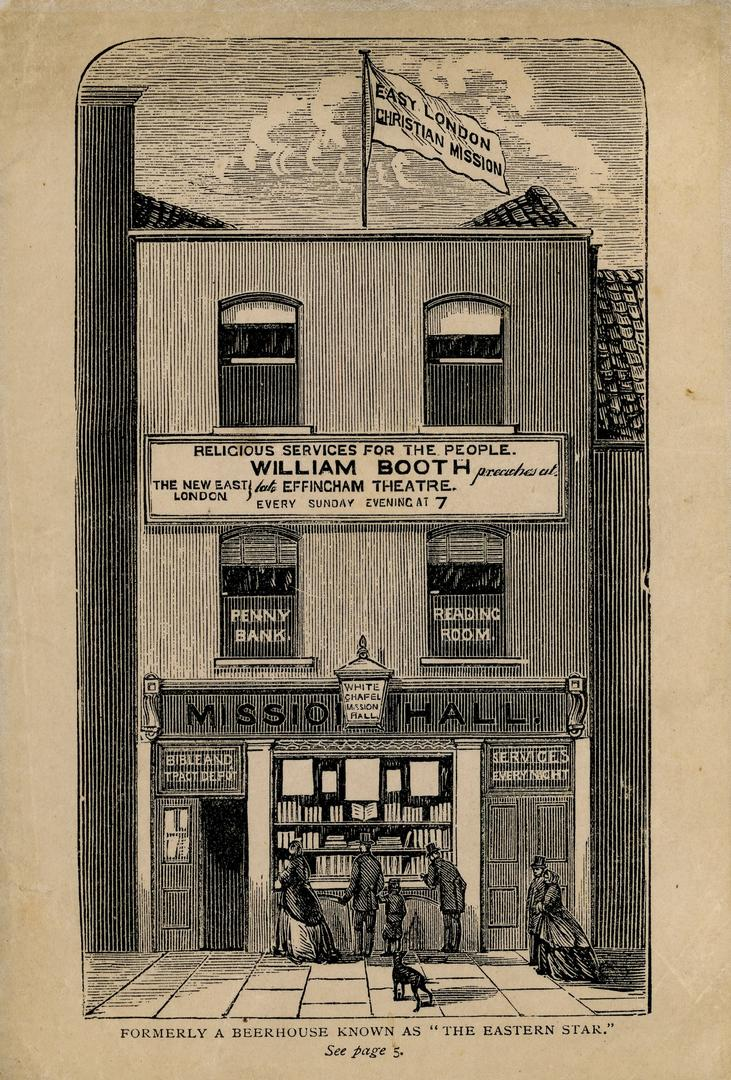
Illustration of the Whitechapel Mission Hall, previously 'The Eastern Star' (1867)

Dowdle found employment as a labourer with a builder and evangelist named Stevens, and when the two were called to do some work at the former public house 'The Eastern Star' in Whitechapel, intended to be the headquarters of the newly-formed The Christian Mission, Dowdle first encountered William Booth, its founder and General Superintendent. Dowdle was an early convert to the Christian Mission, joining the following Sunday after hearing Booth preach. In 1866 Dowdle was a member of the Paddington corps and later that year he became the Mission's first full-time paid evangelist when it extended its ministry outside the East End of London for the first time with his appointment to run the Corps in Poplar in London.

== The Salvation Army ==
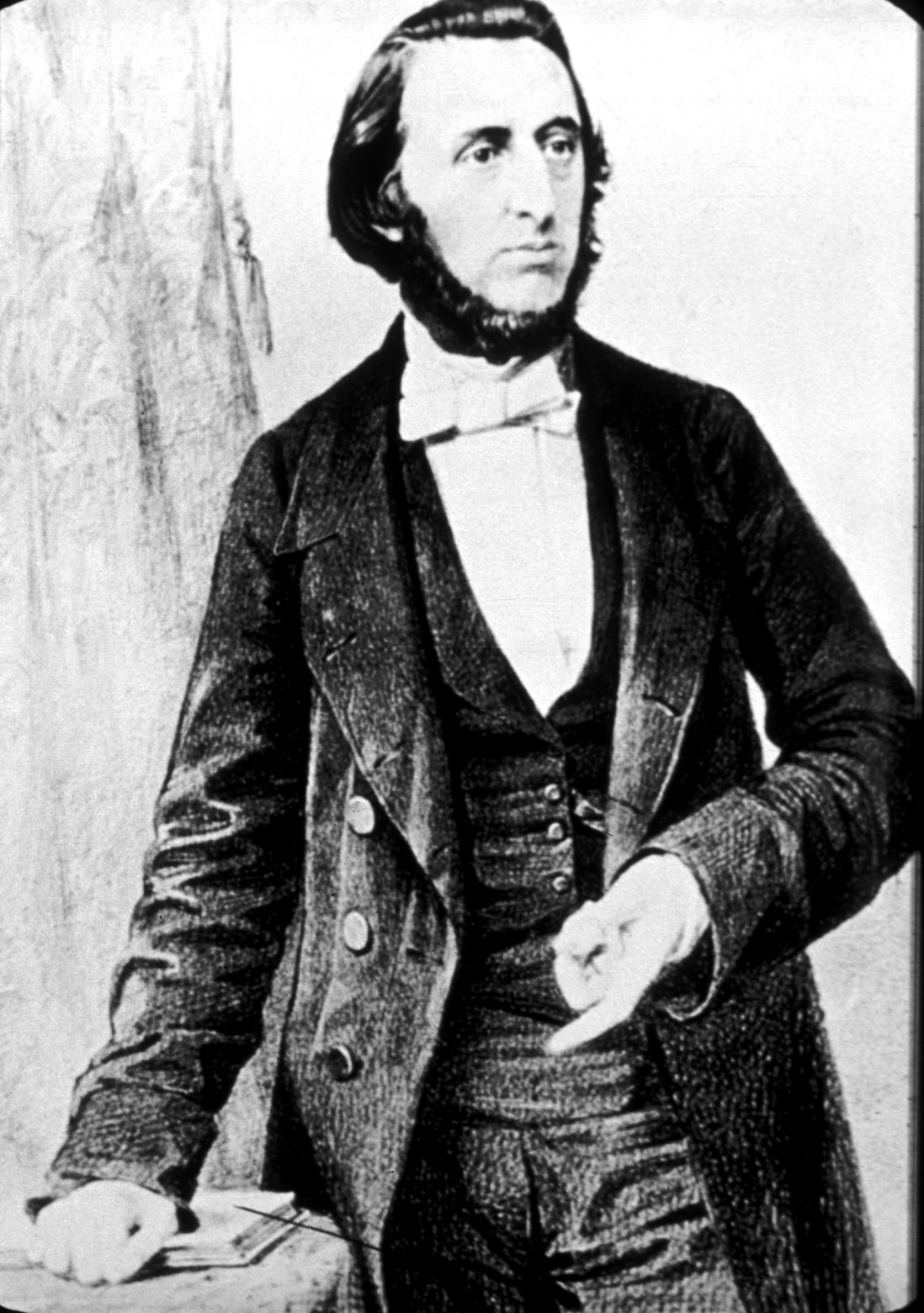
William Booth in about 1862, several years before he met Dowdle

In 1869 General Booth officiated at the marriage ceremony of Dowdle and Sarah Ann Stevens (1840-1912), daughter of Dowdle's former employer. The newly-weds took on the running of a shop in Shoreditch where they served cheap dinners to the poor on weekdays and on Sundays led evangelistic meetings in a former music hall behind the shop. In the 1871 Census Dowdle's occupation is listed as "Labourer".

At this time the Army's mission was to prevent child prostitution and to convert the poor, prostitutes, gamblers and alcoholics to Christianity. Dowdle served in Chatham (1873-1875), Middlesbrough (1875), Stockton-on-Tees (1875-1876), Leeds (1876), Bradford (1877-1878) and Plymouth (1878).

When the 51st Corps of the Salvation Army was formed at Plymouth in July 1878 Captain (later Major) Dowdle, together with his wife and his "Hallelujah Fiddle", held the first meeting in the Central Hall in Phoenix Lane late in August 1878. Here, congregations averaged 500 people a night with one convert describing himself as being "the vilest villain out of hell without being in it." However, Dowdle did not always receive an enthusiastic hearing. In Plymouth forty men arrived at a meeting carrying brimming chamber pots and stormed the hall to drench Dowdle with urine.

During his ministry in Bradford in 1877 Dowdle took over the run-down former theatre Pullan's Theatre of Varieties as a venue for his services. He stated that:

“Some of the vilest characters in the town have been saved. Over 600 have given in their names as getting converted, such as gamblers, drunkards, infidels, blasphemers, adulterers, theatre and music-hall goers, comic singers, clowns, stage players- some who had played and sang upon the very stage where they got converted.”

Dowdle converted John Lawley seen here with his trademark umbrella (c.1877)

Here in Bradford in 1877 Dowdle converted the 17 year-old John Lawley (1859-1922) at a meeting. Lawley himself was later to become a Commissioner in the Salvation Army and was aide-de-camp to General William Booth from 1890 to 1912 as well as to General Bramwell Booth from 1912 to 1921. The meetings at Bradford were noisy and held outdoors followed by a street procession down to Pullan’s, where the main meetings took place. A fellow-evangelist working alongside Dowdle and his wife was Tillie Smith, sister of the famous Gipsy Smith. William and Catherine Booth paid a short visit to Bradford in August, 1877.

For ten years Dowdle campaigned in New Zealand, the United States of America and Canada (1888), Norway, Denmark and Germany. He arrived in Australia in 1878 before becoming Divisional Officer of the Northern Territory of Australia in 1880. Here, in one year, Dowdle travelled 23,500 miles, visited 160 centres and conducted 1,200 Meetings, making more than 6,500 converts. Colonel Dowdle and his wife returned to Australia in 1894, landing at Adelaide where a reception was held in their honour at the town hall. The two had been touring the world for the past year and a half visiting Salvation Army centres where they lead revival meetings.

He became a close friend and adviser to General William Booth. His preaching style, for which he became known as the "Fiery Fiddler", was to place his instrument case on the ground and warn the people around to stand back as it was about to go off. Once a crowd had gathered he would harangue them for ten minutes before plucking his "Hallelujah Fiddle" from under his arm to play and sing a Salvationist hymn. In this way in 1867 he converted Mother Shepherd who became known as the "Hallelujah Washerwoman" as she witnessed and preached around London.

On one occasion while preaching with his wife during a Salvationist service he was approached by a lame young girl who was healed. On hearing of this her father declared, "Walking and cured in The Salvation Army is she? I’ll cure her of that blasphemous nonsense." Taking his heavy stick he went intending to beat her back into her former condition. But, on seeing her, no longer limping but now walking upright and unaided, her heart full of joy and her crutches being carried by a woman behind her, he dropped his stick and marvelled.

== Later years ==
Diagnosed with heart disease in Melbourne in Australia as a result of his great exertions there, in 1896 he and his wife returned to London where they resided at 37 Mayola Road in Clapham.

Commissioner James Dowdle died in the hospital at the Salvation Army Farm Colony at Hadleigh in Essex in July 1900. His funeral service was conducted by General William Booth. His coffin was draped with the Salvation Army Flag on top of which were laid his cap and fiddle. Like other prominent Salvationists, he was buried in Abney Park Cemetery. He left an estate valued at £122 to his widow.

After his death two Salvationist biographies of his life were published: Life of Commissioner Dowdle (1901), and Commissioner James Dowdle: the Saved Railway Guard (1930).
