= Wilfred Kitching =

British Salvation Army General (1893–1977)

General Wilfred Kitching CBE

7th General of The Salvation Army
- In office 1 July 1954 – 23 November 1963
- Preceded by: Albert Orsborn
- Succeeded by: Frederick Coutts

Personal details
- Born: 22 August 1893 London
- Died: 15 December 1977 (aged 84)
- Resting place: New Camberwell Cemetery

Wilfred Kitching CBE (22 August 1893 – 15 December 1977) was a British Salvation Army officer who was their seventh General between 1954 and 1963.

== Biography ==
Born in Wood Green, London, to Theodore and Jane Kitching (née Cranshaw). his father was also a Salvation Army officer. Wilfred attended Friern Barnet Grammar School. He became a Salvation Army Officer at age 20 in 1914. He would serve over 30 years in corps, divisional and National Headquarters appointments, and the British Territory.

He and Adjutant Kathleen Bristow were married in 1929. In 1946, he was sent to serve in Australia South as Chief Secretary. He was sent to Sweden to serve as Territorial Commander in 1948; in 1951, he became British Commissioner.

The Commissioner was elected General of The Salvation Army by the High Council in 1954. During his years as an officer, he wrote many songs in The Salvation Army song book. In 1961, he was awarded a Hon. LLD in Yonsei, Korea. He received a CBE in 1964.

He published Soldier of Salvation in 1963. He published his autobiography, A Goodly Heritage, in 1967.

General Kitching retired on 22 November 1963.

General Wilfred Kitching died at the age of 84. He is buried in New Camberwell Cemetery.

Preceded by Albert Orsborn	General of The Salvation Army; 1954–1963	Succeeded by Frederick Coutts
