= Elijah Cadman =

British Salvation Army officer (1843–1927)

Commissioner Elijah Cadman

Commissioner Elijah Cadman (10 December 1843 – 12 December 1927) was an evangelist, an early member of The Salvation Army and the originator of the idea that Salvationists should wear uniforms. Just five feet tall, he became known as "the Converted Sweep" and "Fiery Elijah" because of his zeal for preaching.

== Early life ==
Cadman was born in Coventry, on 10 December 1843, the youngest of five children of Elijah Cadman (1820–1888), a drunkard, and Mary (née Poole). The father was transported to Australia in June 1845 for stealing, one of 300 convicts transported on the Equestrian, and Elijah Cadman started work as a silk weaver alongside his mother and sister. Aged six Cadman was unusually small and, because of his size, found work at that age climbing and cleaning chimneys for a chimney sweep. He would start work at 4 a.m. and continued climbing chimneys until he was 13, when the British Government passed a law which stopped boys from working up chimneys.

Cadman was often drunk from the age of 6, and by the time he was 17 he could "fight like a devil and drink like a fish". Aged 21 Cadman become a Christian after listening to a street preacher in Rugby whom he had planned to heckle. After his conversion Cadman spent all his spare time as a Methodist lay preacher. An illiterate, Cadman hired a boy to read the Bible to him and committed large sections of it to memory. He was aged 22 when he was taught to read and write by his young wife, Maria Rosina Russell (1841–1923), who he had married on 24 December 1865 at St. Peter's Church, Coventry. The couple had 6 children: Harriet (born 1867), Rachel Rose (born 1873), Beatrice (born 1875) and Charles, and Alice and Samson (who died as children).

In 1876 Cadman sold his house and chimney-sweeping business and took his wife and children to London where he joined William Booth's 'The Christian Mission'. In the same year he was appointed to the Hackney (East London) Christian Mission Station, where he visited the slums in the day and preached in the streets at night.

== The Salvation Army ==
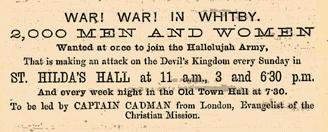
'Captain' Cadman's "War in Whitby" poster of 1878

In 1877 the Russo-Turkish War broke out, and many in Great Britain expected that their own army would soon be joining in that conflict. Hence, those who read the newspapers became used to military terms and expressions. In 1878 Cadman was sent to open The Christian Mission's campaign in Whitby in Yorkshire where he printed posters (left) announcing that the 'Hallelujah Army' was declaring 'War in Whitby' under the command of 'Captain Cadman'. Following this publicity, 3,000 people regularly attended his meetings there, and when William Booth, the General Superintendent of The Christian Mission, stated that he intended to visit Whitby Cadman announced that "the General of the Hallelujah Army" was coming to "Review the Troops". Thus, Cadman was the first self-styled 'Captain' of The Salvation Army and the first person to refer to William Booth as the 'General'. Later, Cadman was put in command of the Yorkshire Corps, being responsible for all the newly renamed Salvation Army's activities in that county.

Cadman was also the originator of The Salvation Army uniform, declaring at the newly formed The Salvation Army's War Congress in August 1878, "I would like to wear a suit of clothes that would let everyone know I meant war to the teeth and salvation for the world". Cadman's earliest uniform cap is held in The Salvation Army International Heritage Centre's collection, together with his Bible, his bugle and his brass 'War Office' plaque from the days when he commanded the Army's Yorkshire Division.

By 1881 Cadman was a Major in The Salvation Army. In 1888 he was appointed to International Headquarters in London and in 1890, by now a Colonel, he became the first leader of the Men's Social Work Headquarters and administered the 'Darkest England' scheme.

== Later years ==
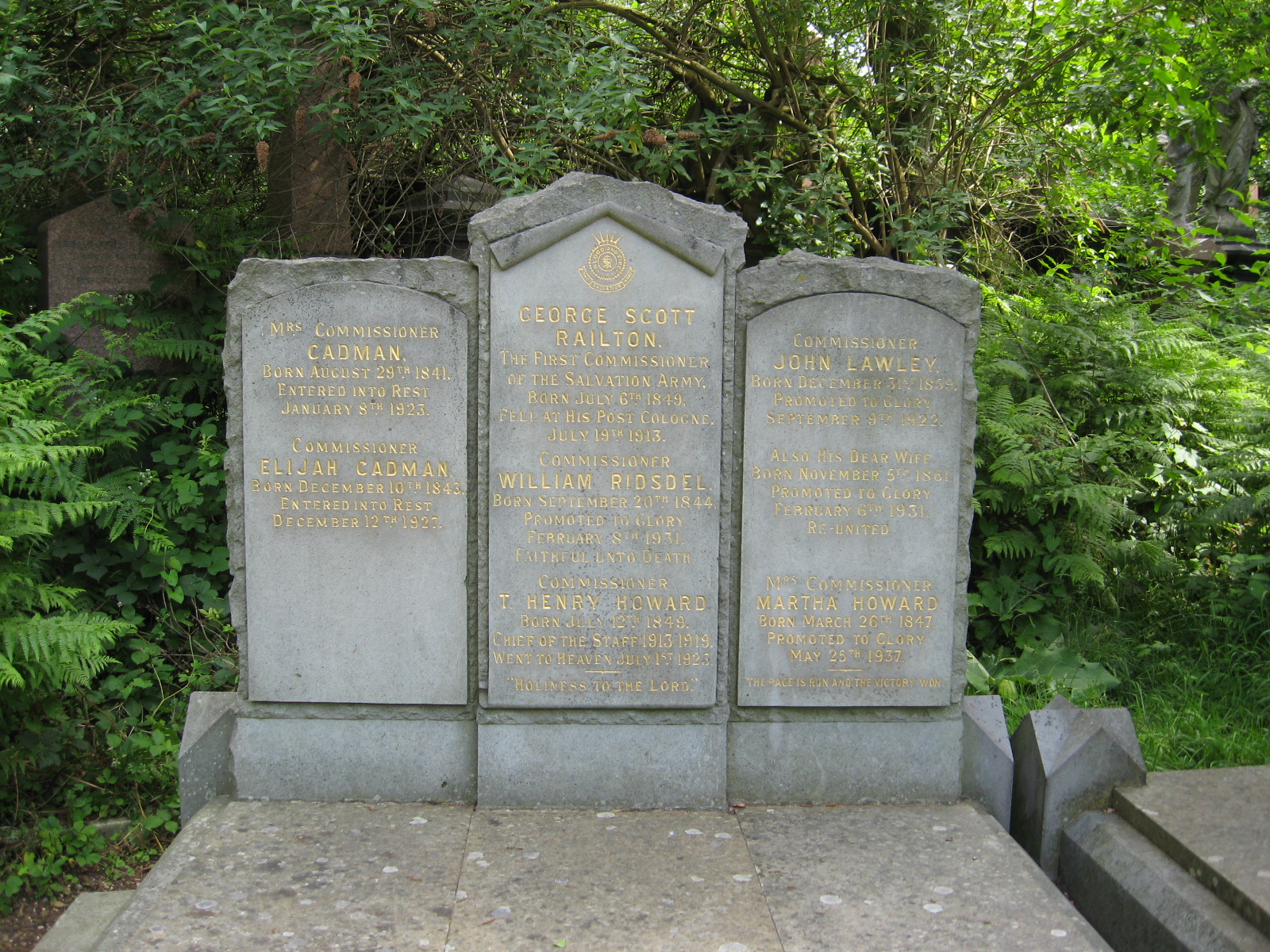
The grave of Elijah Cadman in Abney Park Cemetery

In his later years Cadman held the role of International Travelling Commissioner and campaigned on behalf of The Salvation Army in the West Indies, South Africa, the United States of America, Canada, Australia, New Zealand, India, Scandinavia, Germany and other countries. Until July 1900 he was in charge of The City Colony, a homeless shelter in London which took the poor and destitute and gave them board and lodgings in exchange for a day's work . Cadman accompanied William Booth on all his motorcades around the United Kingdom.

Elijah and Marina Cadman retired from active service in 1915 and lived in Catford, south London. Marina died on 8 January 1923 and Elijah on 12 December 1927.
