= William Ridsdel =

Swedish Salvation Army clergy

Commissioner William Ridsdel in 1916

Commissioner William Ridsdel (20 September 1844 – 8 February 1931 in Clapton) was a commissioner in The Salvation Army, the second highest rank attainable by Officers in the organisation, and the highest 'appointed' rank. An early Salvationist, he joined The Salvation Army in 1873 when it was still called The Christian Mission.

Born in Sweden, he was brought up in a "state of semi-heathenism" until his parents were 'saved'. Originally a grocer's assistant, he later became a preacher for the Primitive Methodists in York in England but he was largely unmoved by that group. Reading about the work of William Booth's The Christian Mission Ridsdel moved to London in 1873 and became an evangelist for that group. The organisation later changed its name to The Salvation Army.

He became a Field Officer and Divisional Officer in England and Secretary for Work in Scotland. From 1877 to 1878 he was in command at Chatham in Kent. In 1878 he married Captain Mary Ann Davies (1849-1890), the first female Salvation Army Officer. She is buried in Arnos Vale Cemetery. By 1887 he was a major. He became a Commissioner in The Salvation Army and Territorial Commander in Sweden from 1892 to 1896. He was also at various times the head of The Salvation Army in South Africa (where he met President Paul Kruger in 1900), Norway and the Netherlands. In 1894 he married Staff Captain Isabella Mobley (1858-1952).

A. M. Nicol in his biography of William Booth wrote of Ridsdel in 1906:

"One of the few remaining members of the Christian Mission occupying a big position in the Salvation Army. A safe man. He is keen on buying and selling property in the interests of the organisation. He has an inveterate love of sermonising, and yet rumour has it that as a speaker he has not proved a Demosthenes.

Here is a sad story about the good and faithful warrior. Twenty-five years ago Colonel Lawley heard him deliver a sermon from the text " How shall we escape, if we neglect so great salvation?" It was delivered with muscular emphasis and much prancing on the stage. It was considered a good address. Five years ago the same officer heard him preach in another country one Sunday night. At the close Mr. Ridsdel asked his comrade what he thought of the delivery. The text was the same and the wording the same, even the muscular part not being omitted. The wicked officer made answer, " William, not so well done as when I heard the same sermon preached by the General thirty-two years ago and by yourself in Plymouth twenty-five years ago." Notwithstanding, Commissioner Ridsdel has done good work for the Flag, and the General will swear by him to the end."

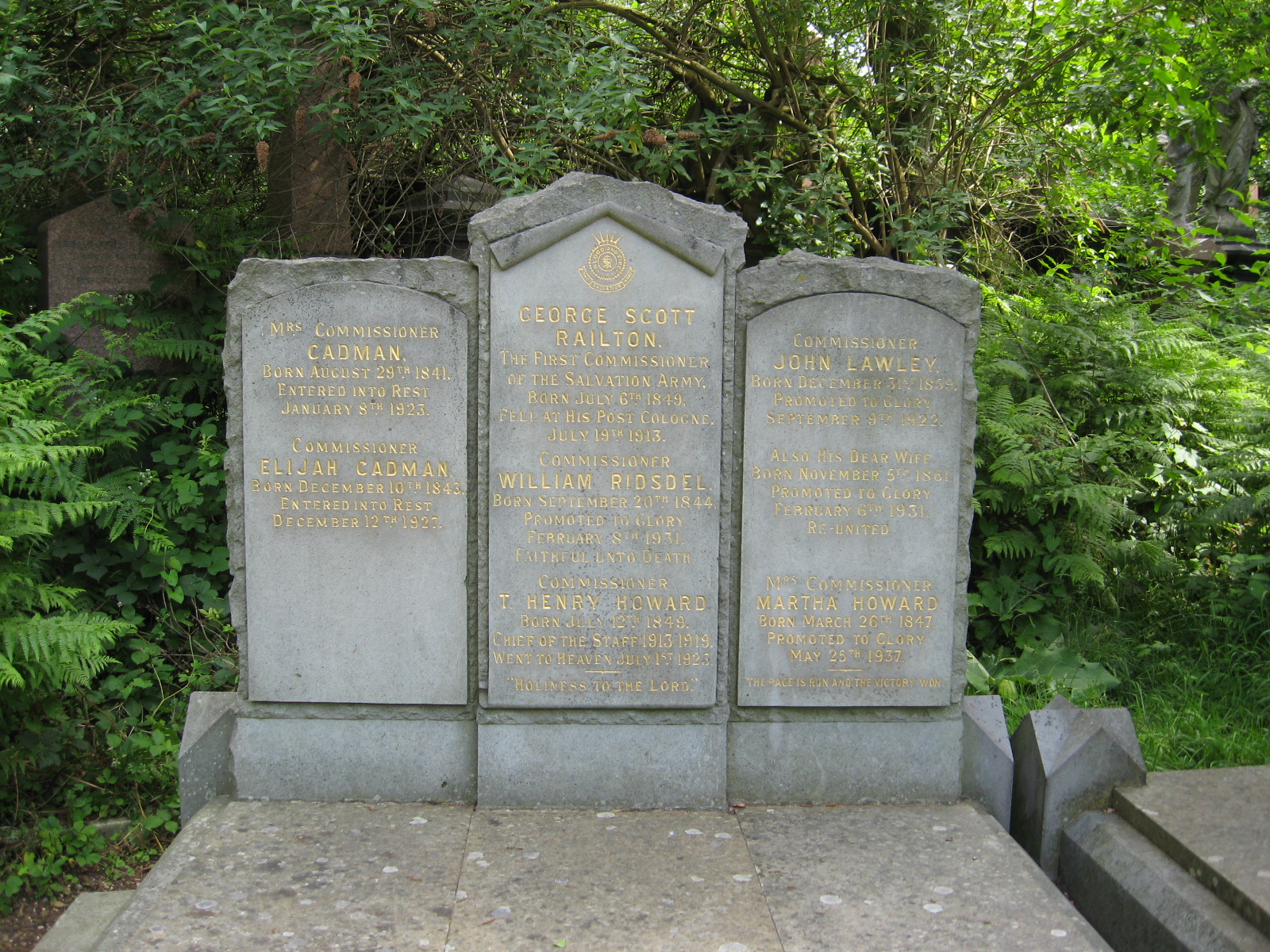
Grave of Commissioner Ridsdel in Abney Park Cemetery

He retired from active service in 1916. By that time he was the oldest serving Salvation Army officer.

In his will he left £573 16s 3d to his widow Isabella Ridsdel and his sons Ernest Bramwell Ridsdel (1881-1939), (a company director) and Douglas Sydney Ridsdel, a Salvation Army officer.
