= Mother Shepherd =

Welsh evangelist (1836–1930)

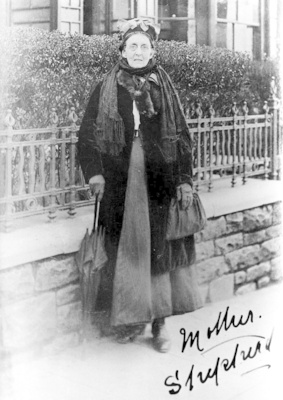
- Mother Shepherd
- Born: Pamela Morgan; 19 March 1836; Talywain
- Died: 24 February 1930 (aged 93); Aberdare
- Other names: Pamela Shepherd
- Education: she could read but not write
- Occupation: Missionary
- Known for: an evangelist for the Salvation Army in Aberdare

Pamela Shepherd born Pamela Morgan known as Mother Shepherd (19 March 1836 – 24 February 1930) was a Welsh evangelist for the Salvation Army notably in Aberdare.

== Life ==
Shepherd was born in Talywain in 1836. Her parents were Margaret (born Evans) and Benjamin Morgan and she was the first of their four children. Her father was a blacksmith and a Chartist and her mother was a Baptist from Cardiganshire, moved the family to London in 1845. Her father hoped to work for the Great Western Railway but struggled to find work due to his political views. The family's finances had to depend on her mother, taking in washing, after her father began drinking.

In 1860 she married William Shepherd a carter. The couple remained in London after the rest of her family returned to Wales the following year. Her husband's family helped financially and she worked as a rag sorter and laundress to support her daughters - despite also developing a drinking problem.

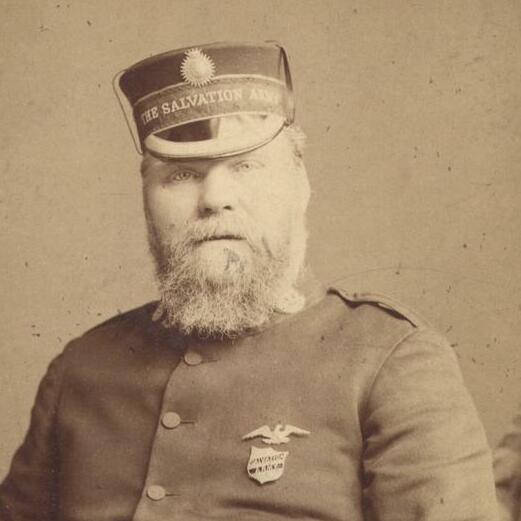
Major James Dowdle of the Sally Army recruited her

She was recruited by the Salvation Army in 1867 after she heard James Dowdle preach. He was known as "the Saved Railway Guard" and she was soon known as the "Hallelujah Washerwoman" as she witnessed and preached around London. In 1868 she was assisted at the home of William and Catherine Booth, and the following year she work at the "Limehouse centre" an old music-hall converted by the mission. By this time, she was no longer known as the "Hallelujah Washerwoman" but as "Mother Shepherd".

In 1878, "Mother Shepherd" was sent to Aberdare by the Salvation Army at the start of a period of growth for their mission. Being a native Welsh speaker, she effectively preached on street corners on Fridays and Saturdays, addressing an audience primarily consisting of ironworkers and miners visiting local taverns. Over five years, she established seven new stations before being recalled to London. Shepherd later returned to Aberdare to continue her work for the community.

Shepherd admitted that although she could read but she had never learned to write. She served as one of the areas probation officers when they were first introduced. Additionally, she provided rooms in her home for homeless girls.

== Death and legacy ==
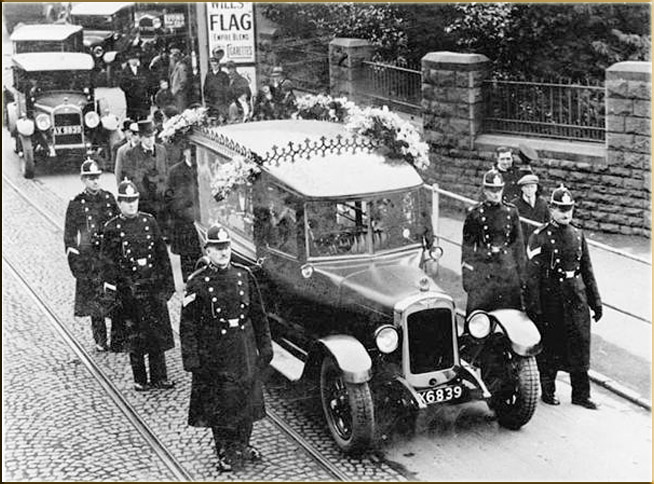
Mother Shepherd's funeral on St David's Day in Aderdare

Shepherd died in Aberdare in 1930. She was given a public funeral with the local police acting as pall-bearers and leading ministers conducting the funeral service.

Her contributions are commemorated in the local Cynon Valley museum.
