= John Lawley =

Commissioner in the Salvation Army

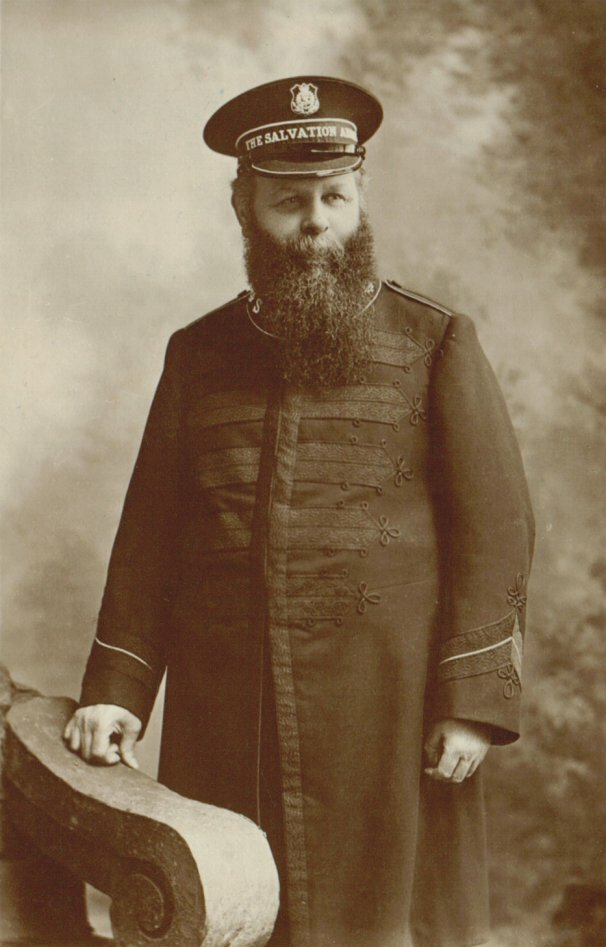
Commissioner John Lawley

Commissioner John Lawley (31 December 1859–9 September 1922) was a Commissioner in The Salvation Army, the second highest rank attainable by Officers in the organisation, and the highest 'appointed' rank. An early Salvationist, he joined The Salvation Army in 1877 when it was still called The Christian Mission. He was aide-de-camp to General William Booth from 1890 to 1912 as well as to General Bramwell Booth from 1912 to 1921.

== Early years ==
John "Johnny" Lawley was born at Foulden in Norfolk in 1859, the youngest of four children born to John Lawley (1835–1918), a farm labourer, and his wife Anne (née Feetham; 1836–1924). The father was a heavy drinker, and by 1871 the entire family were in the workhouse in Swaffham in Norfolk. Later they moved to Bradford in search of work and where "Johnny" was employed in a mill firstly as bobbin ligger and later as an engine cleaner.

== The Salvation Army ==
Lawley with his trademark umbrella (c.1877)

In 1877, aged 17, Lawley was converted by James Dowdle at a meeting of The Christian Mission in Bradford, and soon became the Mission's fortieth evangelist. The young Lawley wanted to wear a dress that would declare to all that he belonged to God, so he obtained a missioner-frock coat, black necktie, a wide brimmed hat, and an umbrella which he used to wave in processions.

Lawley's first command was the Spennymoor Christian Mission Station which opened on 28 April 1878. Here he preached fourteen sermons a week. Aged 19 he was a captain in The Salvation Army, and by 1891 he was a Colonel. When sent to Jarrow with another Salvationist the two met such fierce hostility that a superintendent of the police, two sergeants, and seven constables were unable to keep order. In one open-air meeting here "Lawley was thrown to the ground, and as the mob closed upon him, things were at a serious pass. Just then a newly converted desperado fought her way to him, hauled him up by the collar, and holding him thus, with flaming eyes and clenched fist, dared the mob to touch him".

Lieutenant-Commissioner Unsworth later recalled Captain Lawley at this time:

'The common people heard him gladly and loved him much. I remember him in the old days, forty long years ago, in the canny North, among the miners and iron workers. His laugh, his shout, his friendly manner, reached the hearts of many of those rough, hard-drinking men in Jarrow, in Sunderland, and all along the banks of the Tyne and Wear. They knew him not by any title, but by the love name they gave him in the years gone by, Johnny Lawley."

He married Salvation Army officer Captain Harriett Lawley (née Charteris) (born 1870) in 1887 in Cardiff in a ceremony conducted by General William Booth; they had five children: John Bramwell Lawley (1888-1967), Florence Annie Lawley (1890-1939), Herbert Douglas Lawley (1892-1968), Evangeline Broughall Lawley (1893-1989), and Oswald Victor Lawley (1895-1964).

While preaching, he often performed unusual or unorthodox actions to attract attention. On one occasion while delivering a sermon about the "sea" of God's love and forgiveness he dived from the platform and continued his sermon while doing the breast stroke on the floor. On other occasions he put up an umbrella and ran around in circles to attract outdoor listeners. At another time he tore his little Song Book in shreds as a metaphor for how the Devil tears his prey.

Lawley's first song for The Salvation Army was written at Jarrow in 1879, and by 1916 he had contributed 19 of his songs to the Salvation Army Song Book, with many more in other publications. In all, Lawley commanded eight Corps: Mountain Ash, Hayle, West Hartlepool, Stockton-on-Tees, Sunderland, Nottingham, Bristol Circus, and Plymouth. For a period he was Chief Divisional Officer for Wales; during this time he was promoted to Major. While in charge of the Ipswich Division Major Lawley was sentenced to fourteen days' imprisonment for obstruction.

== With the General ==
Lawley first met William Booth in Bradford soon after The Christian Mission became The Salvation Army in 1878. General Booth also conducted the ceremony when Lawley married Captain Harriett Charteris in 1887 in Cardiff. Following the death of Catherine Booth in 1890 Chief of Staff Bramwell Booth acted as his father's assistant at prayer meetings and elsewhere, but it was soon realised that a full-time Officer needed to be appointed who could accompany General Booth in both his British and overseas tours. The choice fell on Colonel Lawley who was in Scotland when a telegram from Bramwell Booth told him to meet General Booth at Durham, where a Campaign was in progress.

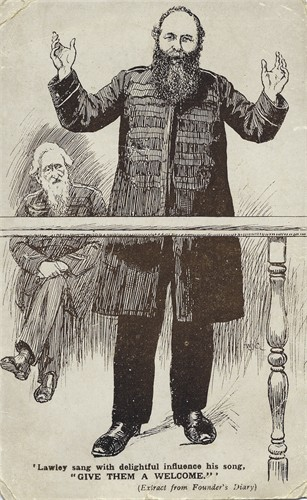
Lawley singing at a Salvation Army meeting

"'Lawley arrived as the General was conducting an afternoon meeting. Slipping into a back seat, he watched the proceedings until the prayer meeting commenced, then the General motioned to him. 'Here, Lawley,' he said, 'see what you can do to help me with this.' Lawley mounted a seat in the middle of the chapel, and led his first prayer meeting with the Founder.

Afterwards, the General took him into the vestry and continued, 'I want some one to help me to pull, when it comes to the prayer meeting. Some one who will give his life up to help me to capture souls. I believe you're the man. Will you come?' Lawley replied, 'Yes, General, by the grace of God I will live to be a fisher of men - but '- he added, with a sudden consciousness of the strain which the call would entail, 'my voice and throat are very bad just now.'

'A few meetings will put that right,' twinkled the Founder. They knelt, and with his hand upon Lawley's shoulder, he prayed God's blessing upon the appointment. Then the Founder exclaimed: 'Lawley, I've annexed you.' From that day, except when illness forbade, for twenty-two years - until the Founder lay down his sword - Lawley was ever at his side in his world-wide labours for souls."

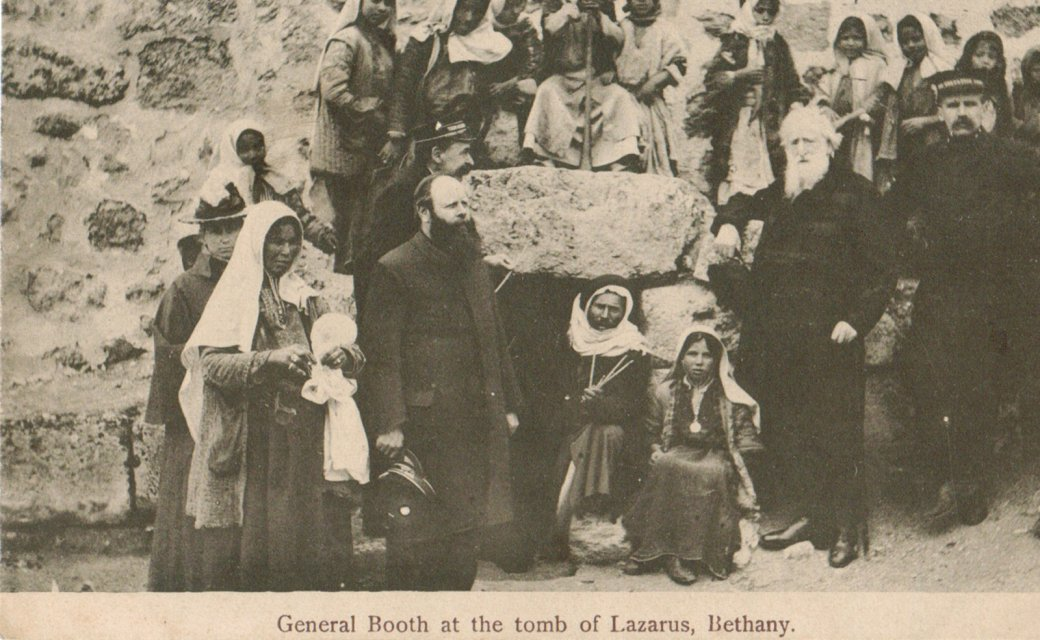
William Booth (right) and Lawley (centre) at the Tomb of Lazarus (1905)

He acted as William Booth's aide-de-camp and was his loyal companion from 1890 until Booth's death in 1912. During services held by General Booth Lawley would often lead the prayers and sing solos. In the early 1900s he accompanied Booth on several motorcades around Britain and went with him on various overseas tours including visits to Europe and Asia, South Africa, Japan, Australia, Canada and the USA. En route to Australia in 1905 they stopped at Palestine where they visited various sites connected with the life of Jesus, including Bethany and the Tomb of Lazarus. In all he travelled 500,000 miles with General Booth.

After William Booth's death Lawley continued as aide-de-camp to General Bramwell Booth, whom he had first met in 1877. He returned from a second tour of the United States in 1921 suffering from a continual heaviness and weariness and what felt like indigestion. General Bramwell Booth allowed him a year away from official duties in order to get better. Lawley and his family moved to Watford in Hertfordshire where he remained active in Salvation Army matters.

== Later years ==
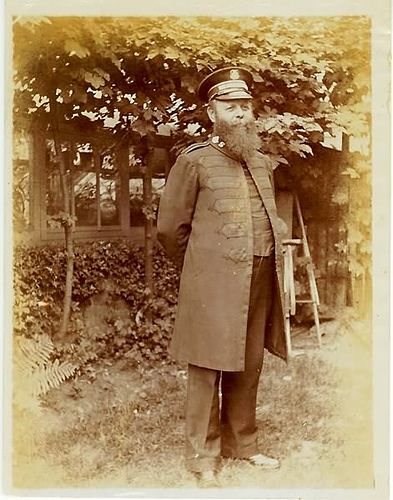
Commissioner John Lawley in 1919

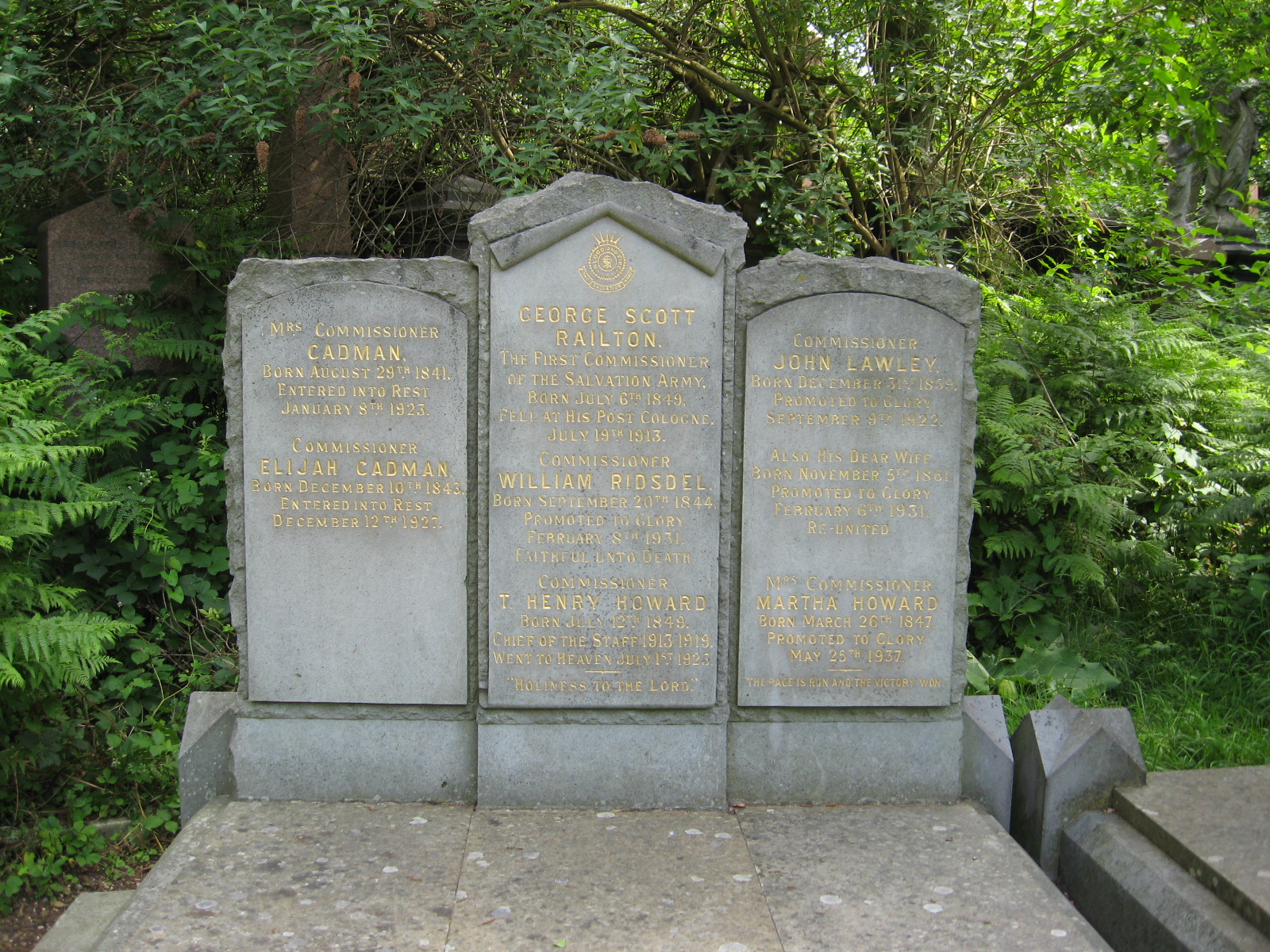
Lawley's grave at Abney Park Cemetery

Lawley was diagnosed as being terminally ill with cancer, which an operation in January 1922 failed to remove. In an article for The War Cry at this time he wrote:

"My old Captain is gone from mortal sight, but he does not leave me for long together. He comes to me in my dreams; in them I see him so plainly. He is just his old self, and looks as he did in the days of long ago. His beautiful old hand with the soft silken fingers, is placed upon my brow, and I feel the nervous twitch as in the past. I have talked to my dear wife of his coming, and she said, " Yes, darling, he comes to see that you are at the old business, and not going back upon your vows!"

'Going back? Why should I? Standing as I do on the frontier of two worlds, I say, and I say it deliberately, that I have very little in my faith and fight to regret. Yes, without doubt my old Captain helps to hold me to it! With him at my elbow, and his grand old face shining up at me through the vista of ten years, go back I dare not!"

As he lay on his death-bed semi-conscious Lawley was visited by Chief of the Staff Edward Higgins who prayed aloud beside him, not knowing if Lawley could hear him. After Higgins had finished his prayers he bent over Lawley and said, "Goodbye, Commissioner." Lawley opened his eyes and smiled and faintly whispered, "Faithful. Faithful."

Lawley died on 9 September 1922 in Watford aged 62. Like many prominent Salvationists, he was buried in Abney Park Cemetery. The funeral procession on 14 September 1922 was led by eight Salvation Army bands. His memorial service that evening at the Clapton Congress Hall was led by General Bramwell Booth who said of Lawley, "He sang his way through this life and he will sing his way through Eternity."

His biography Commissioner Lawley by Mrs Colonel Minnie Lindasy Rowell Carpenter, was published in 1924. Mrs. Colonel Carpenter evaluated his contribution as making The Salvatory Army so attractive to the common people. "This man was enabled to do something really effective for the illumination and education of multitudes of his fellows in one Nation or another" she wrote. The biography Commissioner John Lawley was published in 2010.

== Texts by John Lawley ==
- John Lawley.Come, with me visit Calvary
- John Lawley.Give us a day of wonders
- John Lawley.Have you seen the crucified
- John Lawley.How dark and dreadful is the place
- John Lawley.Jesus laid his glory by
- John Lawley. Near thy cross assembled, Master
- John Lawley. O happy, happy day, When old things passed away
- John Lawley. Though thunders roll and darkened be the sky
- John Lawley. Wanted, hearts baptized with fire
- John Lawley. Weary wanderer, wilt thou listen
- John Lawley. When Jesus was born in the manger
