= Anna Hannevik =

Norwegian Salvation Army Commissioner (1925–2025)

- Born: 9 August 1925; Datong, China
- Died: 27 January 2025 (aged 99)
- Occupation: Salvation Army officer
- Awards: Order of the Polar Star

Anna Hannevik (9 August 1925 – 27 January 2025) was a Norwegian Salvation Army Commissioner.

== Biography ==
Hannevik was born on 9 August 1925 in Datong, China, to missionaries Ingvald Andreas Hannevik and May Thompson. She did not marry.

She held various positions in the Salvation Army in Norway, England and Ireland. She chaired the social work in Norway ("slumsøstrene") from 1968 to 1975, and the social work in Britain and Ireland from 1975. From 1982 she served as international secretary for the Salvation Army in Europe, and she served as Territorial Commander for the Sweden chapter of The Salvation Army from 1986 to 1990. She was a board member of the Norwegian National Women's Council, and a member of Statens Eldreråd. She was decorated Commander of the Order of the Polar Star, and received the Paul Harris Medal.

Hannevik died on 27 January 2025, at the age of 99.

== Selected works ==
- Report by non-governmental organisations in preparation for the end of decade world conference to be held in Nairobi from 15-26 July 1985 : topic : social services and welfare. S.l. : Women's National Commission. 1984. OCLC 779047589.
