= Theodore Kitching =

English Salvationist (1866–1930)

The Right Honourable Commissioner Theodore Kitching CBE
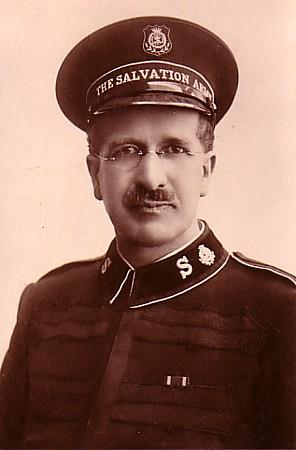

Personal details
- Born: 29 December 1866 Ackworth, Yorkshire
- Died: 10 February 1930 (aged 63) Paris, France

Commissioner Theodore Hopkins Kitching CBE (29 December 1866 – 10 February 1930) was a prominent officer in The Salvation Army, acting as Secretary and confidant to Generals William Booth and Bramwell Booth, and was The Salvation Army's International Secretary for Europe from 1914 to 1916.

Born in Ackworth in Yorkshire, the third of eleven children of school teachers William Kitching and his wife Louisa (née Wilmot), Theodore Kitching was originally a school teacher and a Quaker. He joined The Salvation Army in 1882 aged 16 at a meeting in Bristol, England, and became a Salvation Army officer in 1888, serving in Britain, France, Switzerland, and Belgium. He was Secretary to William Booth, the Founder and first General of The Salvation Army, from 1909 to 1912, Secretary to General Bramwell Booth from 1912 to 1914, and was the Salvation Army's International Secretary for Europe from 1914 to 1916, Salvation Army Editor-in-Chief 1921 to 1929, and head of The Salvation Army Literary Department and Translations Bureau. In addition, Kitching was a close confidant of both William Booth and his son Bramwell.

Kitching accompanied General William Booth on his last tour of the United States in 1907, when they were both filmed working in an "office" – actually a set in an open-air studio. He wrote numerous hymns including How Wonderful It Is to Walk with God. Kitching was appointed a Commander of the British Empire (CBE) in 1920.

Commissioner Theodore Kitching married Jane Cranshaw and with her had four children, the oldest of whom was Wilfred Kitching, who became the 7th General of The Salvation Army.

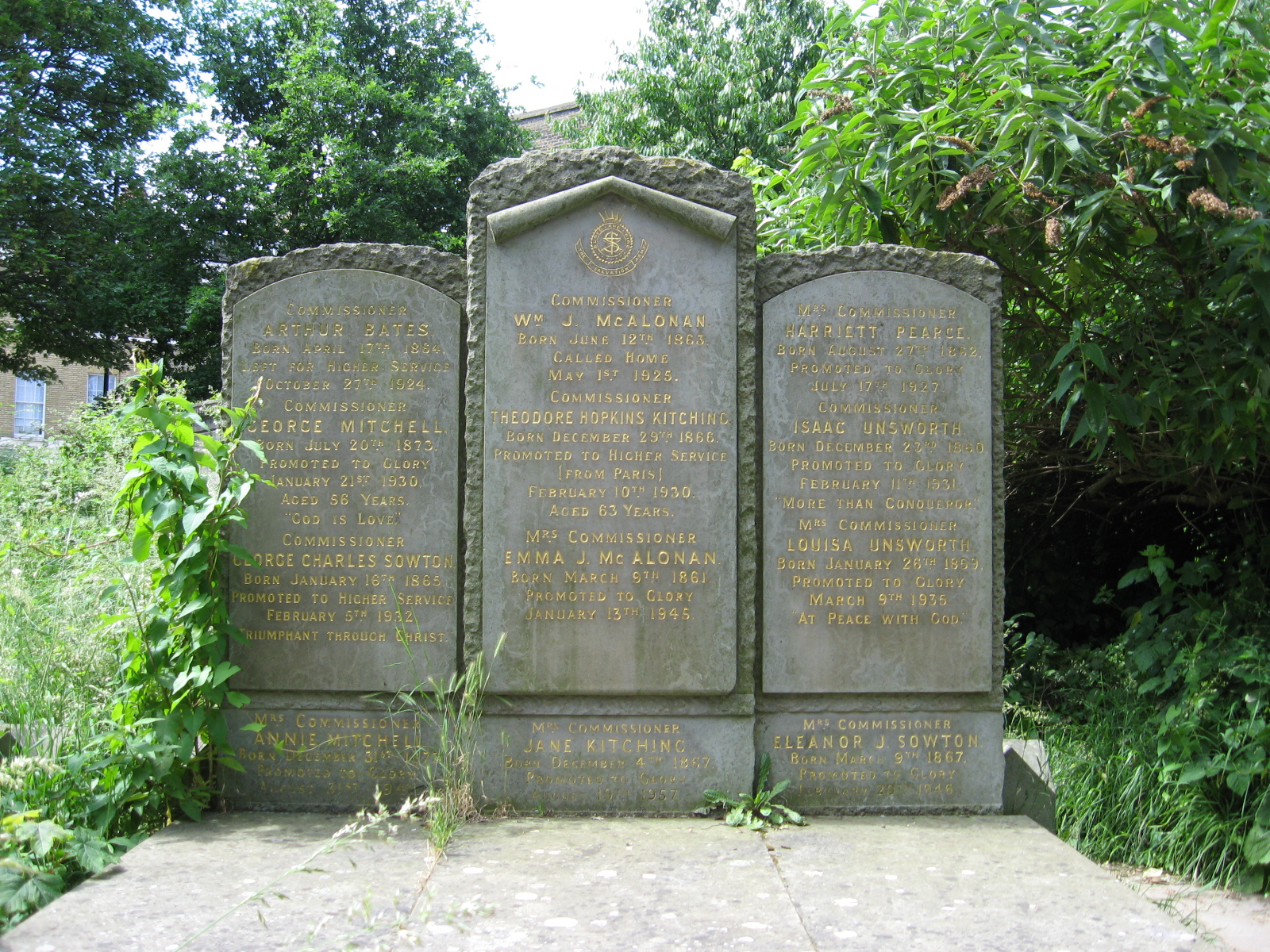
The grave of Theodore Kitching in Abney Park Cemetery

General Edward Higgins decided to send Kitching to Switzerland on a delicate mission which required a man with diplomatic skills. Therefore, early on 10 February 1930 Kitching left his Ealing home for Paris en route for Geneva.

In Paris he was met by an old Salvationist friend who took him to the restaurant at the Gare du Nord. Kitching suddenly slumped forward, as if overcome by fatigue, his head resting on his friend's shoulder. He had died of a heart attack.

Theodore Kitching died in Paris on 10 February 1930, and, like many prominent Salvation Army officers, was buried in Abney Park Cemetery in Stoke Newington, London.
