= Samuel Logan Brengle =

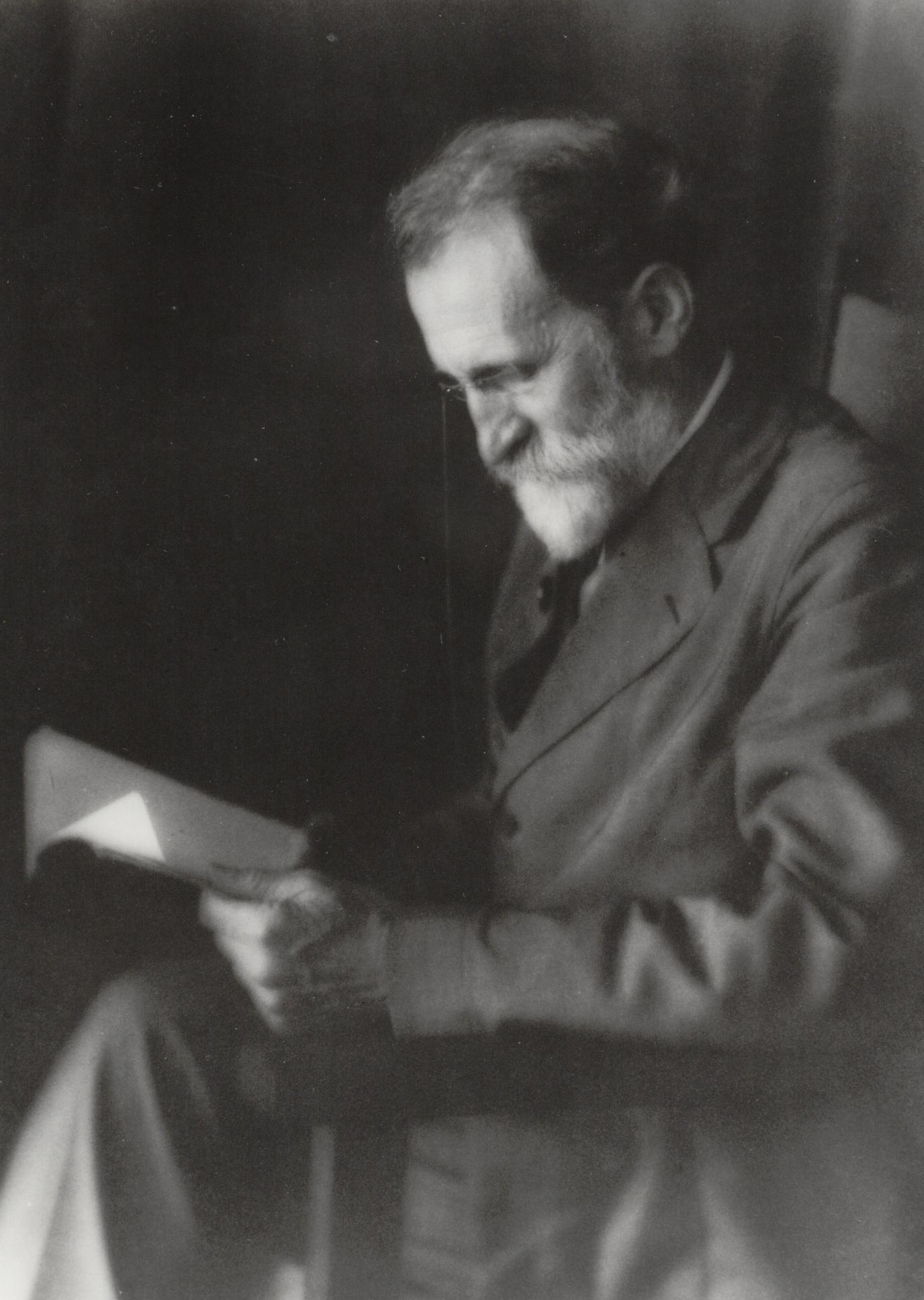
- Born: 1 June 1860
- Died: May 19, 1936 (aged 75)
- Occupation: Author; teacher; preacher
- Education: DePauw University; Boston Theological Seminary
- Notable works: The Soul Winner's Secret, Helps to Holiness, Heart Talks on Holiness
- Spouse: Elizabeth Swift

Samuel Logan Brengle (1 June 1860 – 19 May 1936) was a Commissioner in The Salvation Army and a leading author, teacher and preacher on the doctrine of Holiness. His books include The Soul Winner's Secret, Helps to Holiness and Heart Talks on Holiness.

== Early life ==
As a teenager, he was saved during a revival meeting and began a life of dedication to the Lord. Following the death of his mother he enrolled in what is now known as DePauw University in Greencastle, Indiana. There he was an exceptional scholar and while a number of opportunities were open to him, he felt that his calling was to be a preacher and so following university he became a circuit preacher for the Methodist church. Later on he was encouraged to study theology and so he enrolled at the Boston Theological Seminary. It was at this seminary that he was exposed to the teaching of holiness and later claimed the experience for his own life.

== 'Second Blessing' holiness teaching ==
He described his experience as being a full immersion in the love of God. He would later write of the experience: I walked out over Boston Common before breakfast, weeping for joy and praising God. Oh, how I loved! In that hour I knew Jesus, and I loved Him till it seemed my heart would break with love. I was filled with love for all His creatures. I heard the little sparrows chattering; I loved them. I saw a little worm wriggling across my path; I stepped over it; I didn’t want to hurt any living thing. I loved the dogs, I loved the horses, I loved the little urchins on the street, I loved the strangers who hurried past me, I loved the heathen, I loved the whole world. This experience would become his life's focus as he taught and admonished believers to seek 'the blessing' on an international level.

== Salvation Army career ==
Following his graduation he received offers to pastor some of the largest Methodists churches in the US. However, he turned them down as he became interested in the work of The Salvation Army. He had heard William Booth speak at an open-air service and was drawn to his ministry and mission and he desired to travel to England to meet and volunteer his services to the Founder of The Salvation Army. He had also met a young Salvationist by the name of Elizabeth Swift and had asked for her hand in marriage.

When he did arrive in England and meet the Founder, the meeting was far from cordial, Booth viewed Brengle with some scepticism calling him a dangerous man in that he had been his own boss and Booth was not sure Brengle would adhere to the discipline of The Salvation Army. Nonetheless he was accepted for training and made his home at the Salvation Army Training Barracks in London.

After training he was appointed back to the United States. Early on, many began to recognize the spiritual gifts and ministry of Brengle and later on he was taken out of church work and given a unique spiritual ministry. He was being recognized as a Prophet of Holiness and so he taught and wrote on the Second Blessing, as the experience is called.

This did not come immediately. Rather, after an enjoyable ministry in a community, he and his wife received farewell orders and were appointed to the Boston #1 Corps. This was in a very difficult area of the city. While at this appointment, he was injured when a drunk threw a brick at him. The result of the injury meant he was unable to preach for 18 months. It was during this time of recuperation that he began to write the articles that would form the basis of his book Helps to Holiness. In later years he was the Salvation Army's International Special Spiritual Ambassador of holiness.

He rose through the ranks, attaining the rank of Commissioner. He retired in 1931, but continued preaching and teaching for two more years.

He was asked for his secret of holiness to which he replied: Keep in the will of God, obey Him, seek Him daily, waiting at His gates. Read the Bible regularly. Never neglect secret prayer. Keep testifying to the grace bestowed upon you. Help others.

Brengle died on May 19, 1936.
