= Commissioner (Salvation Army) =

Second highest rank

The rank of Commissioner in The Salvation Army is the second highest rank attainable by Officers in the organisation, and many of the Army's Territorial Commanders and even the Chief of the Staff hold this rank (the highest rank in The Salvation Army, the rank of General, is by election). The rank of Commissioner has been an active rank since 1880, and is one of the original ranks created by General William Booth, the first appointed Commissioner being George Scott Railton.

== Purpose ==
Commissioners are given the rank for a number of reasons, being given command of a Territory being the most common. Other reasons may include appointments to International Headquarters Secretarial positions or other top roles and less commonly other high-responsibility positions throughout the world.

All active Commissioners are called upon to take part in The Salvation Army High Council in which a new General is elected upon the pending retirement or removal of the previous General. Notably, the only time a General has been forcibly removed from office was at the first High Council in 1929 when Bramwell Booth was deposed.

In 1984, spouses of Commissioners, who previously were not promoted to that rank when their partners were, were given the rank in their own right, effectively increasing the amount of Commissioners by two-thirds.

== Notable Commissioners ==
- Theodore Kitching
- George Scott Railton
- Frederick Booth-Tucker
- Arthur Booth-Clibborn
- Charles Jeffries
- Elijah Cadman
- Israel Gaither
- Samuel Logan Brengle
- Catherine Bramwell-Booth
- T. Henry Howard
- John Lawley
- William Ridsdel
- Helen Clifton
- Barry Swanson
- William A. Roberts
- Walter Stanley Cottrill
- Anna Hannevik
- Harry Read
- James Dowdle

== See also ==
- Generals of The Salvation Army
- Chief of the Staff of The Salvation Army
- High Council of The Salvation Army
- Officer of The Salvation Army
- Soldier of The Salvation Army
