= Foulden Common =

UK Site of Special Scientific Interest

Coordinates: 52.570°N 0.596°E

- Site of Special Scientific Interest
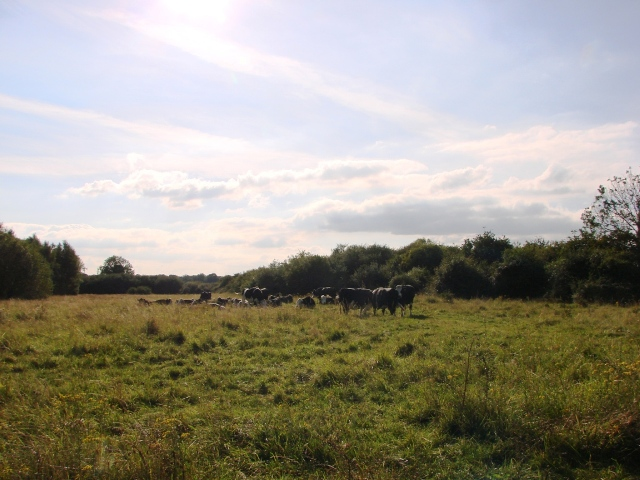
- Location of Foulden Common.
- Area of search: Norfolk
- Grid reference: TF 760 001
- Interest: Biological
- Area: 139.0 hectares (343 acres)
- Notification date: 1984
- Location map: Magic Map

Foulden Common is a 139-hectare (340-acre) biological Site of Special Scientific Interest east of Downham Market in Norfolk, England. It is a Nature Conservation Review site, Grade 2, and part of the Norfolk Valley Fens Special Area of Conservation.

This common has a mosaic of habitats, such as acidic and calcareous grassland, birch woodland, rich fen and open water. Flora in the fen grassland include purple moor-grass, black bog rush, purple small-reed and blunt-flowered rush.

There is limited public access to the common.
