= The War Cry =

Charity newspaper

The War Cry is the official news publication of The Salvation Army. Today, national versions of it are sold in countries all over the world to raise funds in support of the Army's social work.

== History ==
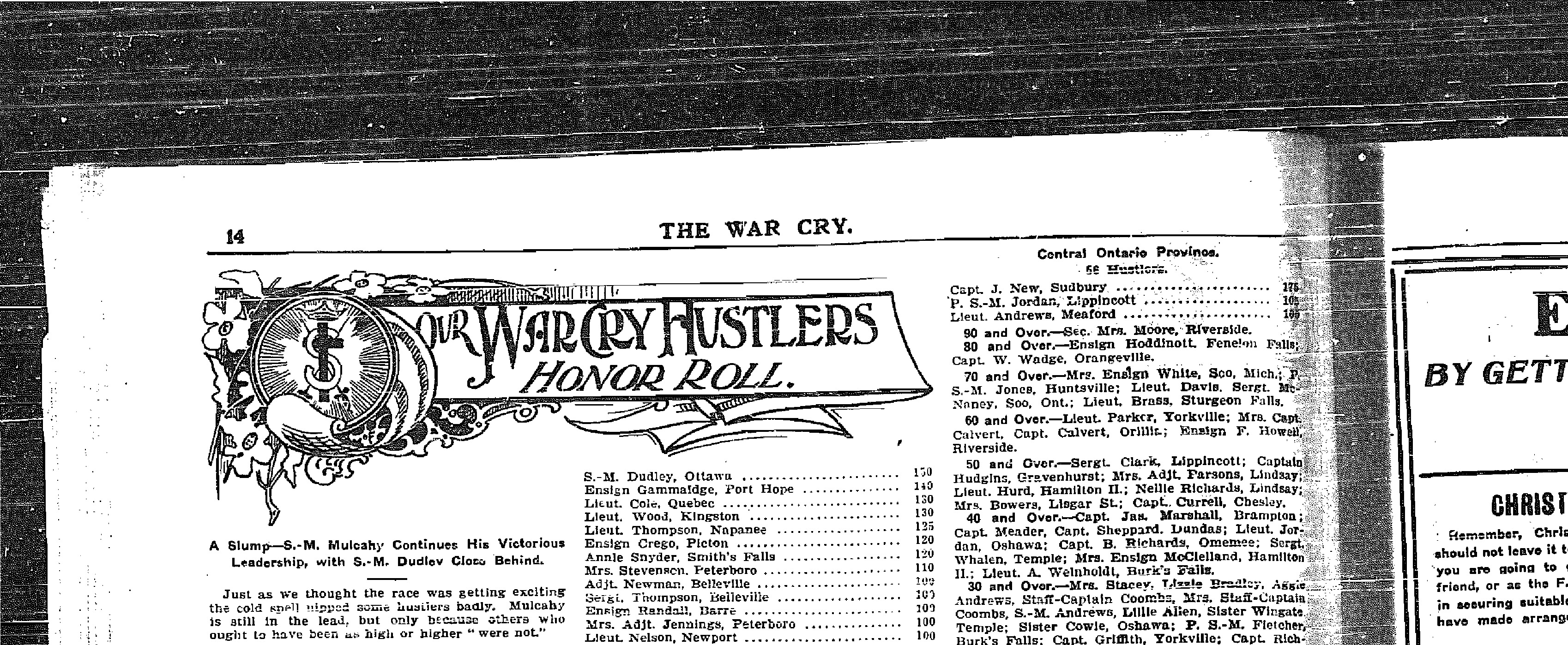
The War Cry, a 1904 edition

The first edition of The War Cry was printed on 27 December 1879 in London, England. In 1880, US Salvation Army Commissioner George Scott Railton published the Salvation News, a small newsletter. He published the first US edition of The War Cry in January 1881 in St. Louis, Missouri. Between 1920 and 1970, each U.S. territory published its own individual version of The War Cry. In 1970, the Salvation Army's US National Headquarters started publishing a nationwide version of The War Cry.
