= Soldier (Salvation Army) =

Adolescent or adult Salvationist

A soldier is a Salvationist who is at least 14 years of age and has, with the approval of The Salvation Army Pastoral Care Council in each local Salvation Army corps (formerly called the Census Board), been enrolled as a warrior in the Christian denomination called The Salvation Army – after signing the Soldier's Covenant (see Salvation Army Articles of War). The soldier expresses his or her commitment in every area of life, but more specifically through the ministry and work of a local Salvation Army corps.

== Covenant ==
Salvationist Soldiers are considered by their peers to be covenanted warriors exercising 'holy passion' to win the world for Jesus. The covenant, known as the Soldier's Covenant, is a lifelong commitment to God through The Salvation Army that is fleshed out by a full book of Orders and Regulations called Chosen to Be a Soldier published by the International Headquarters of The Salvation Army. There is also a complete book, formerly called the Handbook of Doctrine, reprinted as Salvation Story in 1998, and in 2010 became Handbook of Doctrine available as a free download that explains the doctrines to which the soldier subscribes.

The text of the covenant, which is quoted below, reflects the Army's determination to remain faithful to its standards and principles. All Soldiers (including officers of all ranks) are urged from time to time to re-read the solemn undertakings to which they have set their hand and to reaffirm before God their dedication to Him and to The Salvation Army, so that their lifestyle and service will be in keeping with the Soldier's Covenant.

== Enrollment of Soldiers ==
Having completed 'recruits classes', been approved by the Pastoral Care Council and having signed their Articles of War, a soldier is publicly enrolled under The Salvation Army flag usually as part of worship of a Salvation Army corps. The soldier makes a public declaration by reading the articles aloud and will often first wear a Salvation Army uniform on this day. An Officer of The Salvation Army, usually the corps officer of the corps into which the soldier is being enrolled, normally conducts this ceremony.

== Uniform ==
Rank insignia of a Salvation Army Soldier

Soldiers are encouraged to wear the uniform as a sign of covenant community. The uniform is a visible profession of faith in Jesus Christ and identifies the wearer with the Christian faith. The uniform also identifies the wearer as being a person who can be called upon to discover more about the Christian faith.

The uniform differs according to rank, nationality, and activity engaged in.

The Basic Uniform for most territories is

Men

White Shirt, Navy Blue Jacket, Navy Blue Trousers, Navy Blue Tie, Navy Blue Peaked Cap,

Ladies

White Blouse Navy Blue Jacket, Navy Blue Skirt, A white or blue gilded brooch, Navy Blue Bowler style hat,

Often in territories with warm climates grey or white may be used instead of navy blue, and in many countries some bands or songster (choir) brigades use red festival tunics instead of the normal navy tunic.

Often in Summer (around May - September) Soldiers wear Summer Uniform which involves Ladies opting to wear an open neck blouse. Men and women wear short sleeves. Although, the differentiation between "Summer" and "Winter" or "Full" uniform are more a matter of convention, rather than then regulation. All Soldiers wear epaulettes which are Navy blue for Soldiers and pale blue for Songsters and Bandsman. Some Female soldiers now opt to wear trousers in lieu of a skirt. In most countries it is expected that Men remove their caps when indoors and Ladies keep their hats on whether indoors or out. However, there has been a decline in recent years of both men and women wearing headdress. It is likely in coming years that the cap and hat will be phased out. Similarly in many corps soldiers forgo the tunic and simply wear "summer" uniform all year round. One important thing to remember is that the specifics of Soldiers' uniform are decided on a local level, such as what events require uniform, differences between musician and non-mucician uniforms, as well as the insignia of Local (non-commissioned) Officers. These differences may include different cap badges, cap cords, epaulett colour/design, the use of sergeant stripes (small black felt badges with the outline of three chevrons in red) and the use of piping on the sleeve or epaulett. Some roles like Corps Sergeant Major or Corps Secretary often have a cloth badge with the rank's initials embroidered on it, worn on the sleeve of the tunic or the epaulett when in "summer" uniform, with Colour Sergeants traditionally wearing a badge if two crossed Salvation Army flags with the small sergeants badge.

In some corps polo shirts may be worn in place of formal uniforms for some less formal events.

== Criticisms ==
Many Christians (including Salvation Army adherents) accept the tradition of soldiership for various reasons. The most prominent objection is the age at which children may be enrolled, i.e.: 14 years of age, even though this is the age at which many young people in other denominations are confirmed in their faith and become official members of the church. Such opponents argue that it is immoral or deceptive to ask a child to sign a lifelong covenant at that age, particularly when they are too young to legally engage in some of the activities singled out in the Articles of War (consuming alcohol, smoking, etc.).

== Junior Soldiers ==
The Salvation Army takes seriously the capacity of children to have an authentic Christian experience. A Junior Soldier is a boy or girl who, having professed conversion, having signed the junior soldier's promise, and being between the age of 7 and 13, becomes a Salvationist.

In some places Junior Soldiers also wear a form of uniform which differs according to the locality. A Junior Soldier uniform for a boy would be a white collar shirt, navy blue dress pants, black shoes, navy socks, Junior Soldier pins and tie. A Junior Soldier uniform for a girl would be a white collar shirt, navy blue skirt/skort, navy tights, black shoes, Junior Soldier pins. In Australia Junior soldiers have opted to wear a polo shirt reflecting the colours of The salvation Army flag (either blue, yellow or red). This gives the Juniors Soldier a sense of individuality while still belonging to the Junior corps. Often a uniform is not worn, but a Junior Soldier wears a badge (pin) with rings to indicate which level of activity or projects each Junior Soldier has attained (similar to a bar on a military medal).

The 'Junior Soldier promise' reads this:
"I know that Jesus is my Saviour from sin. I have asked him to forgive my sins, and I will trust him to keep me good. By his help, I will be his loving and obedient child, and will help others to follow him. I promise to pray, to read my Bible, and to lead a life that is clean in thought, word and deed. I will not use anything that may injure my body or my mind, including harmful drugs, alcohol and tobacco."

== Enrollment statistics ==
According to The Salvation Army Year Book 2008 as of 1 January 2007 there are 360,222 junior soldiers and 1,082,166 senior soldiers in The Salvation Army. Additionally, in the 2010 Year Book numbers have increased - Junior Soldiers total 378,009 and Senior Soldiers total 1,122,326 internationally. In 2017 Junior Soldiers number 411,327, while there are 1,182,100 Soldiers. As at 2010 The Salvation Army was active in 120 countries, and by 28 October 2016 that had increased to 128 countries.
