= Hiles =

Hiles may refer to the following locations in the United States:

- Hiles, Wood County, Wisconsin, a town
- Hiles (community), Wisconsin, an unincorporated community
- Hiles, Forest County, Wisconsin, a town

== People with the surname ==
- Barbara Hiles (1891–1984), artist
- Darrell Hiles (born 1969), Australian boxer
- Dianne Hiles (born 20th century), Australian accountant and human rights activist
- George Hiles (1825–1896), American businessman
- Henry Hiles (1826–1904), English composer
- John Hiles (1810–1882), writer and organist, brother of Henry
- Osia Joslyn Hiles (born 1832), American philanthropist and poet
- Paul Hiles (born 1948), Bermudian sailor
- Van Hiles (born 1975), American football player
