= Ida Carroll =

British music educator, university administrator, double bassist, and composer

Ida Carroll OBE
- Ida Carroll
- Born: Ida Gertrude Carroll; 1 December 1905; West Didsbury, England, United Kingdom of Great Britain and Ireland
- Died: 9 September 1995 (aged 89); Manchester, England, UK
- Education: Hilda Collen's Matthay School of Music
- Occupations: Music educator; University administrator; Double bassist; Composer.
- Organizations: Northern School of Music; Royal Northern College of Music; Abbeyfield Society

Ida Gertrude Carroll OBE (1 December 1905 – 9 September 1995) was a British music educator, university administrator, double bassist, and composer. From 1956 to 1972 she was President of the Northern School of Music, and she played a central role in overseeing the merger of that school with the Royal Manchester College of Music to found the Royal Northern College of Music (RNCM) in 1973. She was the first Dean of Management of the RNCM from 1973 to 1976. As a composer she wrote several works for the double bass which have become a part of the standard repertoire for that instrument. In 1964 she was awarded an OBE.

== Life and career ==
Born in West Didsbury in 1905, Ida Caroll's father was the composer Walter Carroll. He was her first music teacher, and the original manuscript for a 1912 composition written by him for her piano lessons entitled Tunes for Ida still survives. In 1913 she moved with her family into Glenluce, a large semi-detached house in Manchester where she lived for the rest of her life. She attended Ashfield School and the Manchester High School for Girls. Beginning at the age of 16, she studied the piano at Hilda Collen's Matthay School of Music which became the Northern School of Music (NSM). She soon after took up the double bass when the school's orchestra desperately needed a player; an instrument with which she connected to later as a composer. In the mid-1950s she conducted the string orchestra at the NSM.

After completing her schooling, Carroll was hired by Collens as the NSM's secretary, and Carroll remained in that role until 1956 when she succeeded Collens as Principal of the school after Collens's death. She remained in that capacity through 1972, and played an instrumental role in negotiating the merger of the Northern School of Music and the Royal Manchester College of Music to found the Royal Northern College of Music (RNCM) in the late 1960s and early 1970s. When the RNCM opened in 1973, Carroll was the college's first Dean of Management; a role which she held until her retirement in 1976. During her tenure she established the Ida Carroll Double Bass Award Trust and the Carroll Research Fellowship.

After retiring, Carroll dedicated herself to composing and lecturing throughout Britain on her father's music. She produced a significant body of work for the double bass, of which several pieces have become a part of that instrument's standard repertoire. In 1976 she was President of the Incorporated Society of Musicians. She was also active with the Musicians' Benevolent Fund, the European String Teachers Association, the Graucob Travel Awards, and Live Music Now. She played in the Northern Chamber Orchestra, and continued to teach in the Junior School Division of the NSM. Along with her sister, she donated much of her time to the Abbeyfield Society.

While she never married, Carroll had a lasting friendship with Geoffrey Griffiths whom she met in her youth when he was a member of her father's choir. Griffiths was a bursar at the NSM, and later in life he developed Parkinson's disease. Carroll took care of Griffiths as his health deteriorated; nursing him until his death in 1993.

Carroll died on 9 September 1995 in Manchester. Her papers, speeches, correspondence, diaries, and other artifacts are housed in 'The Ida Carroll Papers' collection at the Royal Northern College of Music Archives.

== Partial list of compositions ==
- Five simple pieces for double bass and piano, 1951, Augener & Co.
- Three pieces for double bass and piano, 1960, Forsyth
- Five national dances for double bass and piano, 1987, Stainer & Bell
