= Walter Carroll =

English composer, music lecturer and author

Walter Carroll (4 July 1869 – 9 October 1955) was an English composer, music lecturer and author. He was born at 156 Great Ducie Street in the Cheetham district of Manchester.

== Early life and education ==
He was a pupil at Longsight High School, Manchester. Leaving school at the age of 14, he went to work at the Manchester textile firm of J. N Phillips and Co., where he learned office routine and account-keeping. Joining the choir of St. John Chrysostom Anglican Church, Victoria Park, in 1886, he studied with the organist there, Frederick Pugh. He composed music for the choir there and became the librarian. In 1887, he also joined the Hallé Choir in Manchester which greatly broadened his choral experience .

== Student and early lectureships ==
In 1888, Carroll (on the advice of Pugh) joined Owens College (later to become part of the Victoria University of Manchester) where he studied advanced music theory with Henry Hiles. In 1890, in the absence of a Music degree at Manchester, Carroll entered for the external Mus. B. degree of Durham University. This was also the first year of the Durham Mus. B. examinations and Carroll was successful along with another local candidate, George Pritchard. On the recommendation of Hiles, Carroll was appointed Lecturer in Music to the Training Students, Owens College Day Training College for Teachers. In October 1892, Carroll was appointed Singing Master in both departments of the Manchester Day Training College and Organist and Choirmaster at St. Clement's Church, Greenheys, Manchester.

In 1893 (on the recommendation of Charles Hallé who had seen his Two Sonatinas, composed the previous year) he became a lecturer in harmony at the newly formed Royal Manchester College of Music and held chairs at the college of harmony and composition (1904-1920), replacing Henry Hiles on the latter's retirement, and of the art of teaching (1909-1920). In addition to these, Carroll was appointed Lecturer in Harmony at the University of Manchester in July 1904. Carroll was elected Dean of the Faculty of Music in 1910.

== Postgraduate ==
In 1894, Carroll studied at Manchester University for the newly established Mus. B. degree and he was awarded this in 1896. In 1900 he became the first student to gain, by examination, the degree of Mus. D from Manchester University.

Carroll started a training course for music teachers in 1907 and was appointed music adviser by the Manchester Education Committee in 1918. He gave up all his other work in 1920 to concentrate on music for children. Carroll regularly visited and advised teachers in about four hundred schools, lecturing on the teaching of singing, instrumental music, and music appreciation. The city's education department had decided that children with no musical training should have a chance to perform. The Manchester Children's Choir was therefore formed in 1925 by Carroll from elementary schools in the area. The choir existed from 1925–1939 and gave concerts, usually in local town halls, during Civic Week. The concerts with the Halle lasted from 1929 until Walter Carroll's retirement in 1935. This choir performed on the famous 1929 recording of Nymphs and Shepherds.

=== Piano Music for Children ===
From 1912 until 1953, Carroll composed a substantial body of original educational piano pieces for children learning the piano. Teaching his young daughter to play, he was dissatisfied with the teaching material then available for the very young and their teachers. Returning from a family holiday in Scotland and filled with memories of their trip to Portpatrick, Carroll and his daughter Ida found that "the tutor (book), with its dull cover and queer contents, seemed very dull". Consequently the compositions were inspired by the Galloway countryside and published as collections with titles inspired by nature, starting with 'Scenes at a Farm' (1912), followed in 1913 by 'The Countryside'. 'Sea Idylls' appeared in 1914 and 'Forest Fantasies' in 1916. In 1922, 'In Southern Seas' (for the more advanced performer) made its appearance and in 1933, 'River and Rainbow'.

Published by Forsyth Brothers Ltd., these miniatures are still popular. One of them, "Alone at Sunset", was included in the Associated Board of the Royal Schools of Music (ABRSM) 2011–2012 Grade 4 examination. "The Reef" (No.5 from In Southern Seas) is included in the ABRSM Grade 4 2019–2020 syllabus. "From the Cliffs", one of the ten pieces in 'Sea Idylls', has been a recurring entry for over 60 years in Canada's Royal Conservatory of Music Grade 5 piano syllabus; in many of its syllabus issues over the years, any one of the Sea Idylls could be presented in that grade. "Walter Carroll's place in English teaching music is like that of Norman Rockwell in American painting," says Canadian pianist Arne Sahlen. "They both were derided for a time as cheaply sentimental, but public regard has risen for their work that expresses quintessential aspects of their countries and cultures." More than his own compositions, he is perhaps best remembered for his compilation for young piano students of short keyboard pieces by J.S. Bach, First Lessons in Bach for the Piano (Manchester: Forsyth, 1908).

Carroll married Gertrude Southam in 1896 and there had two daughters, Elsa and Ida. He retired in 1934 and died at his home, 117 Lapwing Lane in Didsbury, in 1955 at the age of 86. His daughter Ida Carroll was an important music educator in Manchester, and also a composer.
