= Ryland Davies =

Welsh operatic tenor (1943–2023)

- Davies in the 1970s
- Born: 9 February 1943; Cwm, Blaenau Gwent, Wales
- Died: 5 November 2023 (aged 80)
- Education: Royal Manchester College of Music
- Occupations: Operatic tenor; Academic teacher
- Organizations: Royal Northern College of Music; Royal College of Music; Royal Academy of Music

Ryland Davies (9 February 1943 – 5 November 2023) was a Welsh operatic tenor who appeared internationally at leading opera houses and festivals. He focused on Mozart roles such as Belmonte in Die Entführung aus dem Serail, Ferrando in Così fan tutte and Tamino in Die Zauberflöte. He performed as Ferrando first with the Scottish Opera, then at the Glyndebourne Festival, and for his debuts at both the San Francisco Opera in 1970, and the Metropolitan Opera in 1975. His lyric tenor was also well suited to roles such as Rossini's Almaviva, Donizetti's Ernesto, Verdi's Fenton and Britten's Lysander. He later turned successfully to character roles, and performed at the Royal Opera House in London until 2015. He made many recordings, including videos of performances in Glyndebourne and at the Salzburg Festival. Parallel to his singing career, Davies was a voice teacher, from 1987 at the Royal Northern College of Music, also at the Royal College of Music, the Royal Academy of Music, and the Reina Sofía School of Music in Madrid.

== Life and career ==
Ryland Davies was born in Cwm, Blaenau Gwent, to the steelworker Gethin Davies and his wife Joan (née Baker). He was a rugby player in his youth and gained a schoolboys' international cap for Wales against both England and Scotland in the 1957–58 season.

=== Education ===
Davies studied voice at the Royal Manchester College of Music with Frederic Cox; his teacher would remain a lifelong friend. During his studies, he appeared on the opera stage in Manchester, as Paris in Gluck's Paride ed Elena. In 1964, he made his professional debut at the Welsh National Opera in Cardiff as Almaviva in Rossini's The Barber of Seville. He studied further in Italy, and then became the first recipient of the John Christie Award of the Glyndebourne Festival in 1965.

=== Glyndebourne ===
Davies had a long career at the Glyndebourne Festival, where he began in the chorus in 1964, then sang supporting roles such as the Major domo in Der Rosenkavalier by Richard Strauss in 1965, alongside Teresa Żylis-Gara in the title role and Montserrat Caballé, conducted by John Pritchard. He performed as a Sailor in Purcell's Dido and Aeneas and two roles in Mozart's Die Zauberflöte in 1966.

From 1968, he had lead roles, the first year as both Nemorino in Donizetti's L'elisir d'amore, directed by Franco Zeffirelli, alongside Jill Gomez as Adina, and as Belmonte in Mozart's Die Entführung aus dem Serail, alongside Margaret Price as Konstanze and conducted by Myer Fredman. He performed as Ferrando in Mozart's Così fan tutte in 1969, his first time in Italian, alongside Hanneke Van Borkas as Fiordiligi and Anne Howells, his wife, as Dorabella, conducted by John Pritchard. Davies appeared as Lensky in Tchaikovsky's Eugene Onegin from 1975, conducted by Andrew Davis. He portrayed Flamand in Capriccio by Strauss the following year, alongside Elisabeth Söderström as the Countess and Håkan Hagegård as her husband. He performed as Tamino in Die Zauberflöte in 1980, and as Lysander in Britten's A Midsummer Night's Dream from 1981, staged by Peter Hall, and conducted by Bernard Haitink, with Ileana Cotrubaș as Tytania, Cynthia Buchan as Hermia, Felicity Lott as Helena, and Dale Duesing as Demetrius. He appeared as the Prince in Prokofiev's L'Amour des trois oranges from 1982, directed by Frank Corsaro. He performed as Tichon in Janáček's Káťa Kabanová from 1988, staged by Nikolaus Lehnhoff and conducted by Davis, with Nancy Gustafson in the title role and Felicity Palmer as the Kabanicha.

Later he performed character roles in Glyndebourne, such as Don Basilio in Mozart's Le nozze di Figaro from 1997 to 2001, conducted by Charles Mackerras, and Sellem in Britten's The Rake's Progress in 2000, directed by John Cox and conducted by Mark Elder.

=== Performances in the UK ===
Davies appeared at the Scottish Opera in 1966 as Fenton in Verdi's Falstaff. He was recognised when he appeared there as Ferrando, alongside Elizabeth Harwood as Fiordili and Janet Baker as Dorabella, in 1969.

He performed the role of Essex in Britten's Gloriana in 1967 both at the Sadler's Wells Opera in London and in Lisbon. He appeared at the Royal Opera House (ROH) first in 1969, as Hylas in Les Troyens by Berlioz, conducted by Colin Davis. He performed there also as Don Ottavio in Mozart's Don Giovanni inn 1970, Ferrando, Nemorino, Almaviva, Ernesto in Donizetti's Don Pasquale, Fenton, and Enéas in Massenet's Esclarmonde. He returned to the house in 1994 to portray Le Duc in Massenet's Chérubin, playing who he described in a 1998 interview with Bruce Duffie as a "fussy-arsed little chap" who "boss[es] everybody around". He returned to Cardiff the same year to appear as the Podestà in Mozart's La finta giardiniera. His final role, at the ROH, was Alcindoro in Puccini's La bohème in 2015.

Davies appeared at the English National Opera in 1986 as Eisenstein in Die Fledermaus by Johann Strauss. Later in his career, he performed supporting roles there such as M. Ploc in Offenbach's La belle Vivette in 1995, the Chaplain in Poulenc's Dialogues of the Carmelites, in 1999 Basilio, and Reverend Adams in Britten's Peter Grimes.

=== International performances ===
Davies appeared as Cassio in Verdi's Otello at the 1970 Salzburg Festival, staged and conducted by Herbert von Karajan, with sets by Günther Schneider-Siemssen; he sang alongside Jon Vickers in the title role, Mirella Freni as Desdemona, and Peter Glossop as Jago. He performed as Almaviva at the Paris Opéra in 1971, followed there by Ferrando in 1974 and Belmonte.

He appeared in the United States first at the San Francisco Opera in 1970, as Ferrando, in collaboration with director Jean-Pierre Ponnelle. He performed at the Metropolitan Opera (Met) in New York City from 1975 where his first role was again Ferrando. He returned there the following year to perform as Count Almaviva.

He appeared at the Chicago Lyric Opera. In 1984 he performed the title role of Debussy's Pelléas et Mélisande in Berlin and at the Hamburg State Opera. He portrayed the title role of Weber's Oberon at the Opéra national de Montpellier in 1987. In the 1994/95 season, he appeared again at the Met, as Arbace in Idomeneo, directed by Ponnelle and conducted by James Levine; it was broadcast live on 25 March 1995. He returned in 2001 to perform as Monostatos in Die Zauberflöte.

=== Concerts ===
Davies appeared in concert in works including Bach's Mass in B minor, Mozart's Requiem, Haydn's The Seasons and Nelson Mass, the role of Obadiah in Mendelssohn's Elijah, Tippett's A Child of Our Time, and the role of St John in Elgar's The Kingdom.

=== Voice ===
In his prime, the music critic Alan Blyth considers the Davies "had a sweet-toned, lyrical voice and excellent diction." His voice was described as lyric with a specifically Italian sound. Barry Millington from The Guardian noted "the sweetness and Italianate quality of his light voice, his effortless projection and mellifluous legato".

=== Teaching ===
Davies taught at the Royal Northern College of Music from 1987 to 1994, at the Royal College of Music from 1989 to 2009, and later at the Royal Academy of Music. He also taught at the Reina Sofía School of Music in Madrid, as professor from 2014. Students included Ian Bostridge, Sam Furness, Jacques Imbrailo, David Butt Philip, Stuart Jackson, Robert Murray and Andrew Staples.

=== Personal life ===
Davies married mezzo-soprano Anne Howells in 1966; they performed together, often as Dorabella and Ferrando, in Glyndebourne in 1969 and at their debut at the Met in 1975. The marriage ended in divorce in 1981. He later married soprano Deborah Rees; they had a daughter, Emily. They resided in Surrey.

Ryland Davies died from mesothelioma on 5 November 2023, at the age of 80.

== Recordings ==
Davies recorded and performed under major conductors including Sir John Eliot Gardiner, Carlo Maria Giulini, Kirill Kondrashin, Sir Simon Rattle, and Mstislav Rostropovich.

He performed his debut role at the Royal Opera House, Hylas in Les Troyens, in a 1969 studio recording conducted by Colin Davis, with Berit Lindholm as Cassandre and Josephine Veasey as Dido; his wife Anne Howells appeared as Ascagne. He performed as Arturo in Donizetti's Lucia di Lammermoor in a 1971 recording starring Joan Sutherland, Luciano Pavarotti as Eduardo, Sherrill Milnes as Enrico and Nicolai Ghiaurov as Raimondo, with chorus and orchestra of the Royal Opera House, conducted by Richard Bonynge. He was Ferrando in a 1974 studio recording of Cosí fan tutte conducted by Georg Solti, with Pilar Lorengar as Fiordiligi, Teresa Berganza as Dorabella, Tom Krause as Guglielmo, and Gabriel Bacquier, the London Opera Chorus and the London Philharmonic Orchestra; it served for a 1995 film of the Salzburg Marionette Theatre using puppets.

He recorded the role of Belmonte on a DVD from the 1980 Glyndebourne Festival, directed by Peter Wood and conducted by Gustav Kuhn, alongside Valerie Masterson as Konstanze; a reviewer described his "elegant lyric tenor" as "near ideal", rendering "Mozart's phrases and singing with excellent diction". Davies was the tenor in a collection of sacred music by Mozart including the Vesperae solennes de confessore, with Kiri Te Kanawa as the soprano, with the London Symphony Chorus and Orchestra conducted by Colin Davis. He was the tenor soloist in a 1988 recording of Mozart's Requiem, with soprano Helen Donath, alto Yvonne Minton, bass Gerd Nienstedt, the Alldis Choir and the BBC Symphony Orchestra conducted again by Davis. Reviewer Stanley Sadie from Gramophone wrote: "The solo singing is of a very high order with many exquisite moments afforded particularly by Helen Donath's sweet, ringing soprano and Ryland Davies's lyrical tenor (caught at its best)."

In 2007 Davies took part in a live recording from the Salzburg Festival of Eugene Onegin, conducted by Daniel Barenboim, with Peter Mattei in the title role and Anna Samuil as Tatiana; a reviewer wrote: "Davies, in the 1970s and 1980s one of the finest lyric tenors around, now in his mid-sixties was a wonderful tragicomic Triquet with the voice still in fine fettle".
