= Wåhlander =

Wåhlander is a surname. Notable people with the surname include:

- Kristofer Wåhlander (born 1974), Swedish conductor
- Mimmo Wåhlander (1936–1992), Swedish stage and television actress
- Torgny Wåhlander (born 1935), Swedish long jumper
