= Northern School of Music =

- Former names: The Matthay School of Music, Manchester Branch
- Type: Public, Conservatoire
- Active: 1920–1972
- Founder: Hilda Hester Collens
- Principal: Hilda Hester Collens (1920-1956); Ida Gertrude Carroll (1958-1972)
- Location: Deansgate, Manchester (1920-1934); 91-99 Oxford Road (corner of Sidney Street, 1934-1972), Manchester, England; 53.4712756°N 2.2385973°W
- Campus: Urban

The Northern School of Music was a music college located in Manchester which operated between 1920 and 1972 before merging with the Royal Manchester College of Music to form the Royal Northern College of Music.

== History ==
The Northern School of Music was a music college founded in Manchester by Hilda Hester Collens L.R.A.M., A.R.C.M., (24 September 1883 - 28 April 1956), a former piano student of Tobias Matthay from 1910 to 1914. Opening its doors on 22 September 1920, there were originally nine students. Hilda Collens did not wish to use her own name for the school and sought permission from Matthay to use his name, which he gave readily. The school became known as The Matthay School of Music, Manchester Branch. Originally a private institution, the name was changed on 15 September 1943 when the school became a public institution, taking the name "The Northern School of Music".

From 1922, school-age pupils as beginners and improvers were admitted to the Matthay School on a part-time basis. This grew into a flourishing Junior Department which ran on Saturday mornings, though teachers working in the Junior School worked initially without pay.

In 1955, Collens and Ida Carroll met the Parliamentary Secretary to the Minister of Education. The results established that the Northern School of Music was a college of national, and not merely local status.

For years, there were talks between the two principals, Ida Carroll, of the Northern School of Music, and Frederic Cox, of the Royal Manchester College of Music, about a merger of the two establishments. Collens, who died in 1956, had feared that in an "amalgamation", the traditions of the Northern School would be submerged. These talks lasted until 1972 led to the establishment of the Northern College of Music, which became the Royal Northern College of Music upon being awarded the Royal Charter in 1973.

== Locations ==
From 1920 to July 1934 the Matthay School of Music, Manchester Branch, was accommodated in three separate premises at 195-7, then 79 and later 260 Deansgate Road, a main Manchester thoroughfare. In August 1934, it moved to premises at 91, 93 and 95 Oxford Road, Manchester, where it would later extend into 97 and 99 Oxford Road, with an entrance in Sidney Street until 1972. This building later became the site of the students' union of Manchester Polytechnic.

== Aims ==
The Matthay School initially aimed to teach piano students aged 18 and over who wished to study for the external Teaching Diplomas in Music validated by the ABRSM. Hilda Collens also wished to widen the scope of the school. A training course for teachers (initial teacher training for music teachers in schools) was started in 1923. The work on this course was inspected in 1923 by Frank Roscoe, Secretary of the Royal Society of Teachers, and "was recognized as efficient and accepted for registration".

For most of the early years of its existence, the school focused on training music teachers, but gradually, performance came to play an increasing role.

== Timeline ==
- 1920 Matthay School of Music opens
- 1923 Full time Initial Music Teacher Training Course recognised by Royal Society of Teachers
- 1924 First Music Scholarship awarded to Irene Wilde to study at The Matthay School
- 1927 School library opened
- 1927 Commencement of Orchestral and Ensemble classes
- 1927 Scope of the Matthay School Choir extended
- 1927 Part-time tuition extended to adults, including performers, teachers and amateurs
- 1937 Establishment of Old Students' Association
- 1937 Trinity College London performers' diploma added to syllabus
- 1942 Full-time Drama and Dance Department established
- 1943 Name changed to The Northern School of Music
- 1949 First presentation of Messiah (Handel) at Albert Hall, Manchester
- 1952 The Northern School presented its first opera, Smetana's The Bartered Bride, in the Lesser Free Trade Hall.
- 1952 The Ministry of Education (Burnham Committee) gives graduate status (GNSM) to students who fulfil the "special conditions laid down by" The Northern School of Music
- 1957 The GNSM diploma is upgraded by the Ministry of Education into an "internal self-sufficient diploma no longer requiring collateral validation in the form of an external LRAM or ARCM" thus enjoying parity with the graduate diplomas of other music colleges
- 1972 Closure and amalgamation with the Royal Manchester College of Music

== Principals ==
- Hilda Hester Collens (1883-1956), Founder and Principal, 1920-1956 (her death);
- Ida Gertrude Carroll (1905-1995), Acting Principal from April 1956; Principal 1958-1972 (closure of The Northern School of Music)

== Notable alumni ==
- Eileen Derbyshire (Actress)
- Ida Carroll (1905-1995) (Pianist, Double bassist, composer)
