= Conor Collins =

English visual artist

Conor Collins is a visual artist based in Manchester.

== Early life and education ==
Conor Collins is an alumnus of the Royal Northern College of Music and the National Youth Theatre of Great Britain.

== Materials and techniques ==
One of Collins' most distinctive techniques is his use of non-traditional materials. He often incorporates objects and substances that carry significant symbolic weight, such as diamond dust, blood, and hate speech found on social media.

== Notable works ==
=== Tom Daley (2014) ===
In 2014, Collins gained international attention with his portrait of British Olympic diver Tom Daley created using homophobic tweets directed at Daley as he came out as gay. It was later revealed that although Collins had not met Tom Daley, the day after he published his portrait, his parents in fact did. In the same interview he signalled that he 'refused to give the painting to anyone for years' suggesting that he has now parted with the portrait.

=== Alan Turing (2015) ===
Another significant work by Collins is his portrait of Alan Turing. The portrait was made using the blood of gay and bisexual medical professionals banned from donating under UK blood donation laws. Collins is said to have used 26 different persons blood to create the portrait. Although generally well received, it has been suggested that the materials used in Collins' portrait hold more power than the painting itself.

=== Caitlyn (2015) ===
In 2015, Conor Collins created a striking portrait of Caitlyn Jenner, which quickly garnered widespread attention. This piece was created using the hateful and transphobic tweets that Jenner received after publicly coming out.

The portrait is a recreation of Caitlyn's iconic Vanity Fair cover. The written words on the canvas come from tweets sent to Caitlyn which Collins is described to have been horrified by, which Collins then went on to paint. The messages were described as jarring and horrifying: "I hope you die" and "If I was one of Caitlyn Jenner's kids I'd kill myself" are a sample of some of the tweets used to create the image. Conor completed the portrait in a matter of hours, working from 5pm on Friday into the early hours of Saturday morning despite his portraits typically taking two months to create.

=== Trump (2016) ===
In 2016, Conor Collins created his first provocative portrait of then yet to be U.S. President Donald Trump using words and phrases from Trump's own controversial statements and tweets.

The portrait of Trump was meticulously constructed from his most infamous and inflammatory quotes, addressing issues ranging from immigration and gender to international relations and race. There are suggestions that Collins' used Trump's words to create his portrait as Trump's fear-mongering language is the only thing he's made of.

=== Diana (2018) ===
In 2018, Conor Collins created a poignant portrait of Princess Diana made using diamond dust and HIV positive blood and was exhibited as part of the Manchester Pride Celebrations in 2018.

=== Fake News (2020) ===
Conors next portrait of Donald Trump received media attention and sparked debates about free speech, the role of art in politics, and the ethics of using an individual's words in such a critical manner. Through this work, Collins continued to demonstrate his commitment to addressing contemporary issues and challenging viewers to consider the deeper implications of public discourse.

== Exhibitions ==
=== 2026 ===
To See and Be Seen at HOME (Manchester), UK

Under our Skin at Brixton Library, UK

=== 2020 & 2011 ===
New Light Art Prize Tour, Scarborough Art Gallery, Tullie House Museum and Art Gallery, The Biscuit Factory, Bankside Gallery

=== 2016 ===
The Celeste Art Prize at OXO Tower Wharf

The Emerald Art Prize as one of the runners up for the prize

=== 2017 ===
Accessible Art Fair at BOZAR

Shape Open at the Ecology Pavilion, Mile End Park, UK

=== 2018 ===
Superbia at the Cornerhouse, Manchester, UK

=== 2020 ===
New Light Art Prize at the Biscuit Factory

=== 2021 ===
Visibility and Remembrance at the University of South Florida

=== 2024 ===
Manchester Open at HOME Manchester UK

=== 2026 ===
Under Our Skin at The Brixton Library (also known as the Brixton Tate Library), UK

== Target of Abuse ==
Collins appears to have been the subject of abuse due to his artwork. Upon receiving written abuse, Collins decided to annotate and mark the letter humorously and post it online. When asked how he felt receiving hate the artist responded "All I would say is don't let trolls drag you down to their level. Only a person unhappy in their own lives wants to spend their free time bringing others down. Being too busy being happy is the best revenge I'd say!"

== Response to Sainsbury's advert ==
In 2016, Conor Collins garnered significant attention for his critical response to a Sainsbury's store in Camden Road which took out an advert for "an ambitious artist" to "voluntarily refurbish" the facility.

Collins, known for his vocal stance on the value of artistic labor, publicly criticized the advert on social media. Collins attacked the supermarket's attempt to hire someone for free and suggested the store deducted some money from its bosses' salaries to "pay someone to do work for you so that the concept of 'starving artist' wouldn't have to be a thing."

A Sainsbury's spokeswoman apologised for the store's "error of judgment" and said it was in talks with the store.

== Personal life ==
Conor Collins is openly gay and is an advocate for LGBTQ+ rights, HIV awareness, the National Youth Theatre and general support for those in the arts.
