= Philip Newman =

British violinist and pedagogue (1904–1966)

- Born: Philip Newman; 12 May 1904; Manchester, England
- Died: 23 November 1966 (aged 62) Majorca, Spain
- Genres: Classical
- Occupations: Violinist, pedagogue
- Instrument: Violin
- Years active: 1925-1966

Philip Newman (Manchester, 12 May 1904 – Majorca, 23 November 1966) was a British violinist and pedagogue. The son of Harris Newman, cantor of Manchester's Great Synagogue, Newman became a pupil of Adolph Brodsky at the Royal Manchester College of Music, entering the college in 1917 aged 13 and leaving in 1920 without taking a diploma.

In 1924, Brodsky advised Newman to attend the Brussels Conservatoire to study with Albert Zimmer, Ysaÿe's first assistant. After just one year, he won the "Premier Prix de Violon" with maximum marks and distinction, playing the very difficult Violin Concerto in F sharp minor Op. 23 by H. W. Ernst. During his time in Brussels, he also studied with the violinists Henri van Hecke and César Thomson.

Newman spent the years 1928 to 1932 in Berlin studying with Willy Hess, who was by then Germany's foremost violinist and a pupil of the great Joseph Joachim. Here, he learned a style different from that of the Belgian school, of which he was by now a fine exponent.

Newman's first major recital occurred in his hometown of Manchester in the mid-1920s, where his father had hired the Free Trade Hall. However, his first big concert was in Ostend, where he performed the Beethoven Violin Concerto. For some unaccountable reason, his official British debut with orchestra did not take place until 1935, again in the Manchester Free Trade Hall. In 1937, Philip Newman began his long service as a Concours Musical International Reine Elizabeth judge, which had replaced the Ysaÿe Violin Competition. For many years, Newman was also a member of the panel of judges at the Tchaikovsky Violin Competition in Moscow, where he represented the British Council.

Also in 1937, Philip Newman commenced his long association with Queen Elizabeth of the Belgians, becoming her personal violin professor. For many years, the Queen had devoted much of her time to the violin and performed privately with many distinguished musicians. She was a great patron of the arts and an accomplished violinist.

In 1942, Newman took refuge in Portugal and finally arrived in Lisbon, where he became the first non-national Professor of the violin at the National Academy of Music. During his long stay in that city, he organised and promoted concerts for charity, including many for the International Red Cross.

In 1950, he left Portugal to tour England, Belgium, Italy, Spain, and Germany, receiving excellent reviews from critics and fellow musicians.

On his return to Europe, he joined his old friend Casals to play at the opening of the Prades Festival. The Festival of Pollensa, which Newman founded in 1962, became the major activity of his remaining years. A galaxy of artists appeared with him during the September Festival events.

Throughout his career, Newman received many honours and awards. In Belgium, he was an Officer of the Order of the Crown. Portugal awarded him its highest honour, Knight Commander of St. James of the Sword, and the Order of St. John and the Order of Christ for his work during the war years. He was also awarded the Ysaÿe and the Queen Elizabeth of the Belgians medals and later decorated with the Order of Merit and the Order of Leopold. Yet another distinction was a commissioned oil painting which now hangs in the National Gallery, Lisbon. A bust of Newman by his friend Dr. Alfonso Jaume, made in 1966 shortly after his death, now stands at the entrance to the Festival cloisters in Majorca. There is also a plaster cast of his hand, a death mask, on exhibition at the Festival entrance, and a street nearby has been named after him.

Newman's last concert took place on 4 September 1966 at the festival, and the last piece of music he ever played was, at a journalist's request, the same evening. It was the Recitative and Scherzo Caprice by Kreisler. A tour of the Soviet Union was planned but Newman died of a heart attack in his hotel room in Majorca on 23 November 1966, one year to the day after his beloved friend Queen Elisabeth. He was scheduled to have taken part in a television broadcast that evening to mark the anniversary of her death.

He played the 1741 "ex-Vieuxtemps" Guarnerius, now in the charge of Anne Akiko Meyers.
