= Philip Duffy =

British composer and conductor

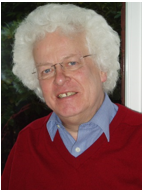

Background information
- Born: 1943 (age 82–83); Liverpool, United Kingdom
- Genre: Church music
- Occupations: Master of Music (Liverpool Metropolitan Cathedral); Lecturer (Liverpool Hope University)
- Instruments: Singing and piano

Philip Edmund Duffy (born 1943) is a British musician. He was the Master of Music at the Liverpool Metropolitan Cathedral from 1966 to 1996 and a Principal Lecturer at Liverpool Hope University from 2000 to 2008. Duffy is also the founder and director of the Liverpool Bach Collective.

== Education and early life ==
Duffy was born in Liverpool in 1943. After an abortive start to learning the piano at seven, he commenced serious study of the instrument with Albert Griffiths when he was sixteen. In 1960, he began organ lessons with Noel Rawsthorne. When he was in sixth form at St. Edward's College (now the Cathedral Choir School), the Lutyens' Crypt of the Liverpool Metropolitan Cathedral was completed and brought into use. Duffy then decided to join the newly-formed cathedral choir.

Duffy went on to study at the Royal Manchester College of Music and the University of London. At Manchester, he studied organ with Ronald Frost and singing with Gwilym Jones. While in London, he studied under Henry Washington—one of the country's leading choir directors—in the choirs of Brompton Oratory and the Schola Polyphonica. As a member of the Schola Polyphonica, he took part in the first performances of early church music given at Henry Wood Promenade Concerts. Duffy also performed with Michael Morrow's early music group Music Reservata.

== Career ==
=== Liverpool Metropolitan Cathedral ===
Duffy was associated with the music of Liverpool's Metropolitan Cathedral of Christ the King for over thirty-six years; for most of them, he was Master of the Music (1966–1996). Eight months before its consecration and opening, Duffy was offered the post of Acting Choirmaster at Liverpool Metropolitan Cathedral. Shortly afterwards, he was appointed Master of the Music.

As it was held in Liverpool, Duffy was responsible for the music of the liturgical celebrations that opened and closed the 1980 National Pastoral Congress of the Roman Catholic Church. Theologian Fergus Kerr described the celebrations in the New Blackfriars journal: "The settings … by Philip Duffy… taken up easily by the whole congregation… were of an almost barbaric but utterly disciplined beauty, unprecedented in any English Catholic Church in modern times…" Duffy's work was recognised afterwards by Pope John Paul II, who appointed him a Knight of the Equestrian Order of Saint Gregory the Great.

His composing for choir and congregation was recognised again in 1982. During another visit by Pope John Paul II to Britain, Duffy's music was chosen for the large-scale papal masses that took place in Liverpool, Wembley, Manchester, Cardiff and Crystal Palace. Of the Papal celebration in Liverpool, The Tablet reported that "Liverpool's Glorias, Alleluias and Hosannas must have brought Heaven running to the windows.” During this year, Duffy also founded the Metropolitan Cathedral Orchestra, now known as the Hope Metropolitan Orchestra.

=== Other activities ===
Duffy was a member of the Roman Catholic Bishops' National Committee on Church Music for many years. He has also been a member of the councils of Universa Laus (an international society of liturgists and musicians) and the Royal School of Church Music. At the invitation of the Archbishop of Canterbury, Duffy was a member of the Archbishops' Commission on Church Music in the Anglican Church from 1988 to 1992.

Since leaving the cathedral, Duffy has undertaken singing and conducting engagements. Recent activities have included the roles of tenor soloist in Mozart's Requiem and baritone soloist in Brahms' Requiem. Duffy has often acted as chief cantor for the Schola Gregoriana, a Cambridge-based group dedicated to Gregorian chant. He led this group on a ten-day recital tour of Venice. He is the Associate Director of Music of the Schola and he continues to lead chant workshops in parts of the country.

Duffy worked at Liverpool Hope University from 2000 to 2015. Besides lecturing in music, he led the degree programme BA in Creative and Performing Arts. Duffy retired from a full-time post as Principal Lecturer in 2008 and became the university's Director of Performance, then for several years continued as Director of the University's Chamber Choir.

In 2013, Duffy founded the Liverpool Bach Collective. The group performs Bach cantatas at Sunday Evensong in churches around Liverpool. The Bach Collective consists of eight singers and about ten instrumentalists. In its first three years, the Collective performed 29 cantatas in 19 different churches.

Duffy was the producer and presenter of a weekly classical music programme. The programme aired on Radio City, Liverpool's independent local radio, for the first nine years of its existence.

== Honours ==
- Knight of the Order of St. Gregory the Great (KSG)
- Associate of the Royal Manchester College of Music (ARMCM)
- Honorary fellow of the Guild of Church Musicians (FGCM), 1994
- Fellow of the Higher Education Academy (FHEA)
- Fellow of the Royal School of Church Music (FRSCM), 2009
