= Frederic Cox =

British singer, composer and music educator (1905–1985)

Robert Frederic Cox (1905–1985) was a British singer, composer and music educator.

Cox was the Professor of Singing (1949–53), Principal (1953–1970) and Principal Emeritus (1970– ) at the Royal Manchester College of Music and then a singing teacher at the Royal Northern College of Music from 1975 to 1985. He is recognized as one of the finest singing teachers of the second half of the twentieth century, and was himself a student of the renowned Italian tenor Aureliano Pertile.

Distinguished pupils of his included John Mitchinson, Glenville Hargreaves, Joseph Ward, Ryland Davies, Anne Howells, Elizabeth Harwood, Rosalind Plowright, Robert Alderson, Dennis O'Neill, Mary Brennan, Sandra Browne, and Ann Murray.
