= Willy Hess (violinist) =

German violinist (1859-1939)

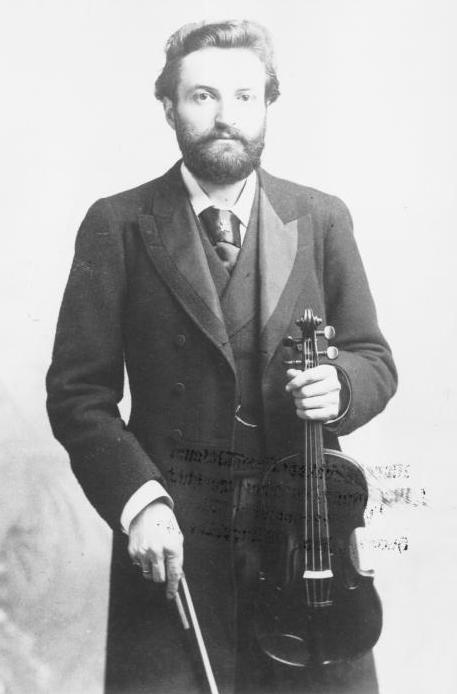

Willy Hess (14 July 1859 – 17 February 1939) was a German violinist and violin teacher.

== Biography ==
Willy Hess was born in Mannheim on 14 July 1859. He commenced the study of violin when only five years of age with his father, who was a pupil of Ludwig Spohr. When aged seven his family moved to the United States and as a youth he performed with his sister Joanna who accompanied him on pianoforte, making a number of successful tours around the country. In 1872 he moved back to Europe, spending a year in the Netherlands and performing in a number of continental cities. In 1874 he made an extended tour including London, Belgium and France. In 1876 he went to Berlin to be a student of Joseph Joachim and after two years left to take up the leadership of the Oper Frankfurt. He resigned from that post in 1886 to take up a professorship in the Rotterdam Conservatorium voor Muziek which he held for two years. In 1888 he moved to Manchester to become leader of The Hallé Orchestra and from its opening in 1893 was also the principal professor of violin at the Royal Manchester College of Music. In 1895 he was appointed as principal professor of violin at the Conservatorium der Musik in Coeln (Cologne).

From 1904 to 1910, he was the concertmaster of the Boston Symphony Orchestra and taught violin at Harvard University. He also spent time as concertmaster in Frankfurt and Rotterdam. He then relocated to Berlin in 1910 to take the position of premier violin instructor at the Royal Academy of Music in Berlin, Germany (Berlin Hochschule fuer Musik, now a part of the Berlin University of the Arts). The composer Max Bruch, a friend of Hess, helped arrange Hess's appointment as professor. During the time of the Weimar Republic the Hochschule was the hub of the international music scene, and Hess was associated with many of the musical luminaries of his day and taught students who came to Berlin from all over the world, the most distinguished of whom was his fellow German Adolf Busch.

Hess taught a German style of right hand technique which emphasized wrist motion with very little finger motion.

He had no difficulty alternating between the violin and viola, and performed the viola part in the first performance of Bruch's Double Concerto for Clarinet, Viola and Orchestra, Op. 88, as well as the first performance of the Violin Concerto, op. 50 by Felix Woyrsch 1903 in Altona. It was also in 1910 that Bruch composed the Concert Piece for Violin and Orchestra, Op. 84, for Hess. Hess advised Bruch on composing for strings, and also performed the premieres of other works by Bruch.

Among works by other composers written for Hess was Arthur Foote's Ballade, Op. 69.

He played in a piano trio with cellist Hugo Becker and pianist James Kwast.

One of the instruments he played on was a Guadagnini.

Hess died in Berlin in 1939, aged 79.

== Notable students ==
- Ferruccio Bonavia
- Adolf Busch
- Arthur Catterall
- Arthur Fiedler
- Georg Kulenkampff
- Philip Newman
- Nikos Skalkottas
- Tossy Spivakovsky
- Harold Sumberg
- Henri Temianka

  David Grunschlag
