= Martin Milner (violinist) =

English violinist

Martin Milner OBE (17 February 1928 – 21 June 2000) was an English violinist. From 1958 to 1987 he was leader of the Hallé Orchestra.

== Life ==
Milner was born in Bolton in 1928; his father was a headteacher and organiser of the Bolton Youth Orchestra. He was educated at Bolton School, and went on to study at the Royal Manchester College of Music (RMCM), where his violin professors were Henry Holst and Thomas Matthews. He also studied in Denmark with Emil Telmányi.

In 1946 he joined the first violin section of the Royal Philharmonic Orchestra. He subsequently taught at the RMCM; he also had freelance engagements, and led the Buxton Spa Orchestra.

=== Hallé Orchestra ===
Milner was chosen in October 1958 by John Barbirolli, conductor of the Hallé, to lead the Manchester-based orchestra.

He established a successful relationship with Barbirolli. Barbirolli respected his opinions and musicianship, and during absences on conducting engagements he left Milner detailed instructions for rehearsing particular works. He once wrote to Milner: "You are the finest leader I have ever had in my fairly long career."

He remained as leader under Barbirolli's successors James Loughran and Stanisław Skrowaczewski. Milner appeared many times as soloist with the Hallé, playing works including the Elgar Violin Concerto and the Walton Violin Concerto. He retired in 1987, after 29 years as leader. In that year he became an Officer of the Order of the British Empire.

=== Family and later years ===
He was married three times; with his first wife Elizabeth Walton (niece of William Walton, and pianist at the RMCM) he had three sons and three daughters. With his third wife Diana Wanklyn, principal double-bass player in the Hallé, who survived him, he had three sons.

Milner died in 2000, aged 72, at his home in Didsbury in Manchester, after a long illness.
