= St Edward's College =

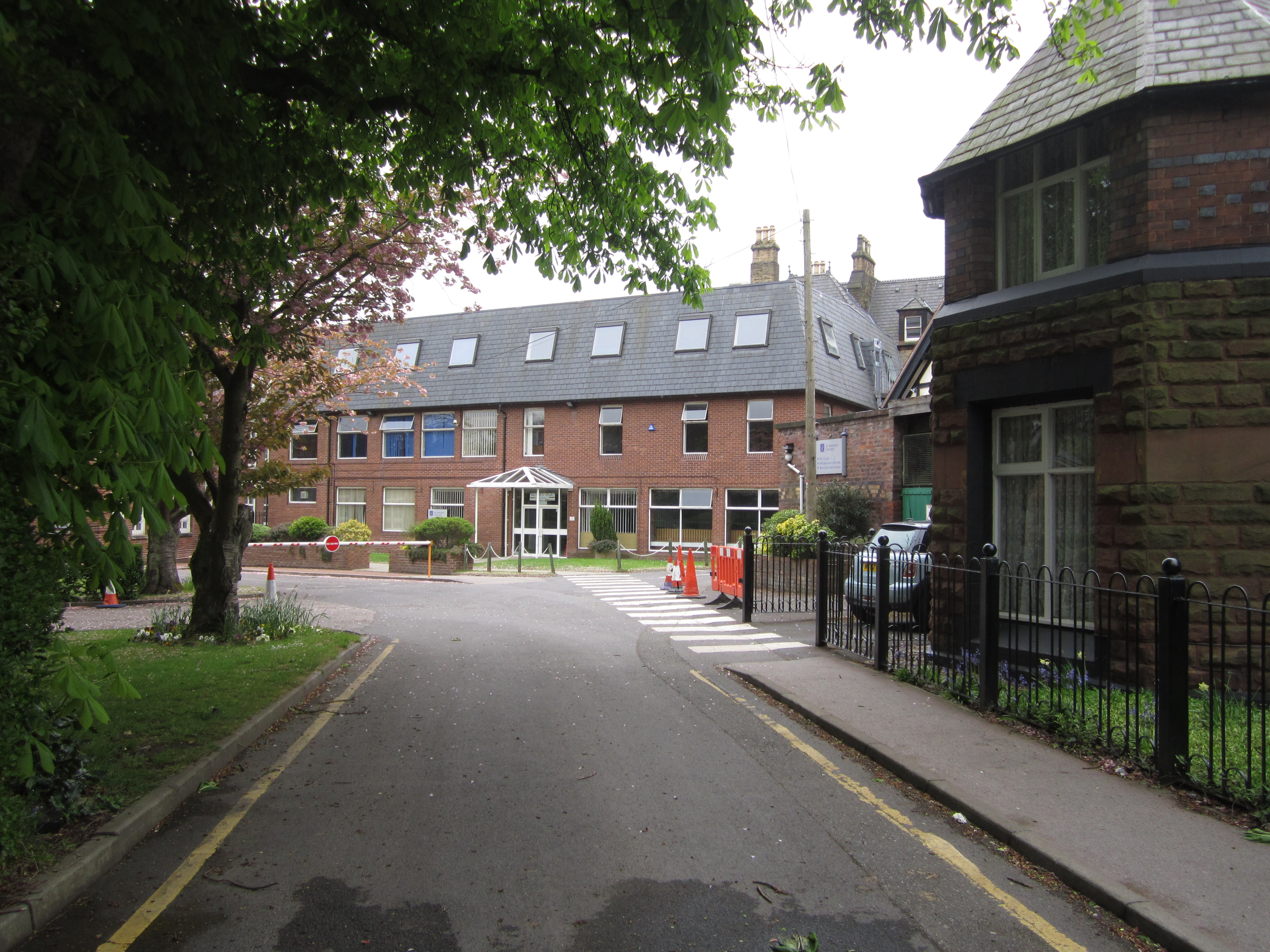
- The school in 2013

Location
- North Drive; West Derby, Liverpool, Merseyside, L12 1LF; England; 53°25′26″N 2°54′31″W

Information
- Type: Academy
- Mottoes: Courage though Faith
- Religious affiliation: Roman Catholic
- Established: 1853; 173 years ago
- Founder: Monsignor James Nugent
- Local authority: Liverpool City Council
- Specialists: Languages, Arts
- Department for Education URN: 136735 Tables
- Ofsted: Reports
- Chairman: John O'Brien
- Principal: Lee Fabia
- Gender: Co-educational
- Age: 11 to 18
- Enrolment: 1200
- Colour
- Diocese: Archdiocese of Liverpool
- Website: www.st-edwards.co.uk

St Edward's College is a co-educational Catholic school with academy status in the UK located in the Liverpool suburb of West Derby. Founded in 1853 as the Catholic Institute, the college was formerly a boys grammar school run by the Congregation of Christian Brothers, known widely as the Irish Christian Brothers. St Edward's College is heavily oversubscribed every year – being the most oversubscribed school in Liverpool. The College has a reputation as being one of the best schools in North West England.

== Admissions ==
The school currently enrols 170 pupils each year, with 15 of these places being taken by choristers for the Liverpool Metropolitan Cathedral school choir. The admissions policy is a 'lottery' entry system. The school is heavily over-subscribed each year with 2015 being the year with the most applications. In 2015 there were over 900 applications for 150 places, making it the hardest secondary school in north-west England to gain entry to, with only 16% of applicants being successful.

The school is situated on the south side of Queen's Drive (A5058), a half-mile east of the A57.

The North Liverpool Extension Line railway once passed to the rear of the school, next to the playing fields.

== History ==
In 1853 the school was founded as the Catholic Institute by Father James Nugent. This was only three years since the re-establishment in 1850 of the Catholic Church in England and Wales as a public body following the abolition of the last of the penal laws against Catholics in the United Kingdom. It was also a time when barely 5% of Catholic children received any education at all.

The Institute was situated in premises in Hope Street, near the Liverpool Philharmonic Hall, and was formally opened by Cardinal Nicholas Wiseman, who had been appointed Archbishop of Westminster in 1850.

The Catholic Institute continued, but by the beginning of the twentieth century was in decline. In 1909 the superiors of the Irish Congregation of Christian Brothers were approached by Bishop Thomas Whiteside, Bishop of Liverpool since 1894, and later to be Archbishop of Liverpool, with a view to taking over the running.

Some years prior to the Catholic Institute, in 1848, another school had been established in the city under the name of St Edward's College. This was a boarding school, housed in a large mansion called St Domingo House. The building was named after the city of Santo Domingo, founded in the Caribbean by Bartholomew Columbus in 1496, later capital of the Dominican Republic, which was where George Campbell, a privateer who in 1763-64 was Mayor of Liverpool, had made his fortune.

The reinstituted school changed its name from the Catholic Institute to St. Edward's College, a change that was fairly unpopular, especially among former pupils who had lost friends during the First World War. To this day, the association of former pupils is called the CIEA (Catholic Institute Edwardian Association).

In its new form St. Edward's College was a boys' grammar school and later became a direct grant grammar school in the English educational system. In the late 1970s, direct grant grammar schools were discontinued, and many became fully-fledged independent schools, as did St Edward's.

The school was boys-only until 1982 when girls were admitted into the 6th form. In 1991 girls were admitted into year 7, and by September 1995 the school was completely co-educational. Many of its places were funded by the assisted places scheme – it was operating as a private day school right into the late 1990s.

It became a grant-maintained school in September 1997, then a voluntary aided school in 1999. No longer was a test required to gain admission to the school. Its junior section, Runnymede St Edward's, did not join the state sector and instead became a private school but still maintains links with the College and continues to occupy the campus next door.

On 1 May 2011, St. Edward's College formally gained academy status and became officially known as St Edward's College Edmund Rice Academy Trust. This includes a reference to Blessed Edmund Rice (1762-1844), the Irish Catholic educationalist and founder of the Congregation of Christian Brothers, formerly associated with the school, and also of the Presentation Brothers.

In February 2024, the school's principal, Stephen Morris, stepped down at the end of the academic year. The resignation was triggered by a poor Ofsted report, in which the college had been downgraded from an Excellent to a Requires Improvement, as well as pending National Education Union action. That December, a new report was published, in which the college received a Good rating.

== Sandfield Park and new buildings ==
The school relocated from St Domingo Road, Everton to Sandfield Park, West Derby on 19 September 1938, an event which was marked by every pupil walking the 3 miles from Everton to West Derby.

The site at Sandfield Park consisted of two Victorian mansions, Runnymede and St Clare's, each of which had substantial grounds. Runnymede became a preparatory school, while St Clare's became the home of the Irish Christian Brothers teaching at the school. A new school building, consisting of four wings around a large quadrangle, was erected, along with a gymnasium. Laboratories were built in the 1950s and a swimming pool and running track in the 1960s. A Sixth Form Centre and Sports Hall were added in the 1970s. A Design Centre was built in the 1980s. The John Morgan Sports Complex and Dining Hall and Performing Arts facilities were added in the 1990s. The turn of the century saw the complete refurbishment of one of the original properties, St Clare, into the new Upper School Centre.

== Cathedral choir ==
St Edward's has been Choir School to Liverpool Metropolitan Cathedral since the early 1970s, and there are usually about 18 Cathedral Senior Choristers among the pupils of the College. It, therefore, has the honour of being the only voluntarily aided Roman Catholic Cathedral School in the country. Its affiliated prep school Runnymede St Edward's educates younger choristers.

=== Masters of the Music/Directors of Music ===
- Dr. Howard – Present Director of Music
- Christopher McElroy – 2012
- Philip Arkwright: September 2011 – December 2011 (Acting Director of Music)
- Timothy Noon: August 2007–August 2011 (Director of Music)
- Terence Duffy: March 2005 – July 2007 (Director of Music)
- Richard Lea & Terence Duffy: November 2004 – March 2005 (Joint Acting Directors of Music)
- Keith Orrell: January 2004 – October 2004 (Director of Music)
- Richard Lea: September 2003 – January 2004 (Acting Director of Music)
- Mervyn Cousins: 1997–2003 (Director of Music)
- Katherine Dienes: 1996–1997 (Acting Master of the Music)
- Philip Duffy: 1966–1996 (Master of the Music)
- Christopher Symons: 1960–1966 (Master of the Music)

== Rugby tradition ==
During the Second World War, the pupils were evacuated to Llanelli, Wales. The game of rugby was already played before the war but when the pupils returned from Llanelli the tradition of playing rugby began in earnest. In particular, this period established the tradition of St. Edward's playing Union, rather than League, rugby. Since then, the school has produced rugby stars such as England internationals Mike Slemen, Ted Rudd and Kyran Bracken.

In the mid-1960s the 1st XV side went unbeaten for three years and won many sevens competitions.

The under 16 team of 2004–2005 won the Liverpool St Helens U16 Floodlit Cup and recently embarked on a tour of New Zealand where it became the first team to score against Auckland Grammar School in almost two years.

The under-18 sevens squad of 2011 reached the last sixteen of the National Schools Sevens held at Rossyln Park beating opposition such as Ellesmere College and also secured wins at Birkenhead and Ampleforth sevens.

== Annual celebrations ==
The whole college meets three times a year in the Liverpool Metropolitan Cathedral. In October it is to celebrate the feast of Edward the Confessor, the saint the college is named after. A mass is held at the cathedral.

In December, the college meets at the Cathedral to celebrate a Christmas service.

In March, the college meets at the cathedral for Founder's Day. This is the annual prize-giving day.

== Rankings ==
In 2009, the College achieved the second-best GCSE results for comprehensive schools in Liverpool, and the best for co-educational comprehensive schools – the league table for Liverpool is dominated by faith schools. At A level, results are still good but fifth in Liverpool. The A-Level results of 2018 showed that 99.7% of all results were at a pass-rate.

== Notable alumni ==
Former pupils are referred to as Old Edwardians. Noted Old Edwardians include:

- Kyran Bracken, member of England Rugby Union World Cup Winning Squad
- John Barrett, Bishop of Plymouth (1929–46)
- Stephen Baxter, author
- James Romanus Bilsborrow, Bishop of Port-Louis (1910–16), and Archbishop of Cardiff (1916–20)
- Dan Carden, Labour MP (since 2017) for Liverpool Walton
- Ramsey Campbell, author
- Therese Coffey, Conservative MP (since 2010) for Suffolk Coastal and Deputy Prime Minister of the United Kingdom (2022)
- Alex Cribley, footballer, Liverpool F.C. & Wigan Athletic F.C.
- Richard Downey, Archbishop of Liverpool (1928–53)
- Shaun Evans, English actor
- Thomas Flynn (Bishop of Lancaster) (1939–61)
- Vincent Gillespie, Tolkien Professor of English Literature and Language (since 2004 at the University of Oxford
- Frank Irving, pioneering glider pilot and Senior Lecturer at Imperial College London
- Amy Jackson, film actress/model
- John Kerrigan, Professor of English (since 2001) at the University of Cambridge
- Peter Kilfoyle, Labour MP (1991-2010) for Liverpool Walton
- Sir Terry Leahy, CEO of Tesco retail chain
- Peter McGrail, Gold medallist (boxing, bantamweight) at the 2018 Commonwealth Games
- Paul Preston CBE, Professor of International History (since 1991) at the London School of Economics
- Michael Rock, Olympic swimmer
- Mike Slemen, rugby player
- Michael Williams, actor; late husband of Dame Judi Dench

== See also ==
- List of direct grant grammar schools
