= Barry Griffiths (violinist) =

English violinist (1939–2020)

Barry Griffiths OBE (20 May 1939 – 17 September 2020) was an English violinist. During his career he was leader of three well known orchestras.

== Life ==
Griffiths was born in Birmingham in 1939, the only son of Frank Griffiths, a butcher, and his wife Margaret; they were both amateur musicians, and encouraged him to play piano and violin. He was the first leader of the Midland Youth Orchestra (founded in 1956), and went on to study at the Royal Manchester College of Music.

He joined the BBC Northern Symphony Orchestra (now the BBC Philharmonic), in the 2nd violin section, in 1964, and was appointed its leader in 1972.

In 1976 Griffiths joined the Royal Philharmonic Orchestra (RPO) as leader. He appeared as soloist with the orchestra, playing works including Elgar's Violin Concerto and The Lark Ascending by Vaugham Williams, which they recorded in 1987. He left in 1989 to become leader of the orchestra of English National Opera (ENO). He also occasionally conducted both of these orchestras.

He became an Officer of the Order of the British Empire in 2002, for services to music. He retired from the ENO in 2004; during retirement he conducted student orchestras, particularly the Lydian Orchestra in Kent.

He married in 1964 Angela Caldwell; they had eight children.

Griffiths died in 2020. Andrew Klee, a 1st violin in the RPO, wrote: "He was really concerned about being part of the identity of the orchestra.... As a leader, Barry's knowledge of the orchestral score was extraordinary. We always felt that he was listening to every individual and if it wasn't good enough, he'd tell you."
