= Concerto for Clarinet, Viola, and Orchestra =

1911 composition by Max Bruch

- by Max Bruch
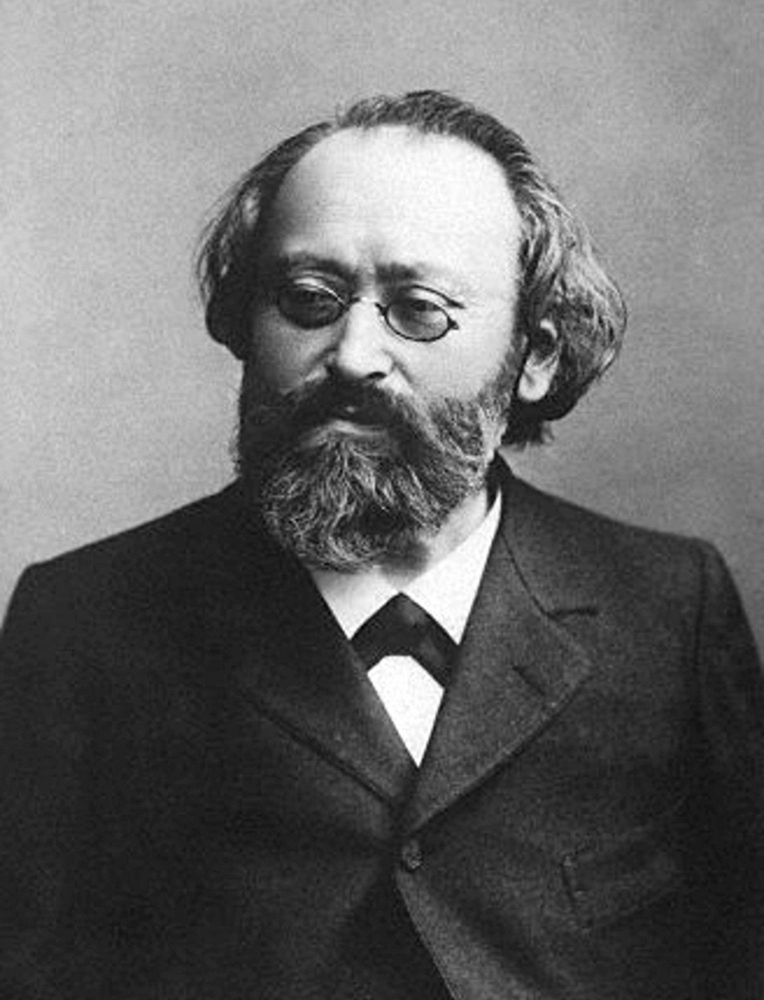
- Max Bruch
- Opus: M. 88
- Composed: 1911
- Published: 1942
- Duration: 20 minutes
- Movements: Three
- Scoring: Solo Clarinet, Viola, and Orchestra

Premiere
- Date: 5 March, 1912
- Location: Wilhelmshaven, Germany
- Performers: Willy Hess, Max Felix Bruch (son of composer)

The Concerto for Clarinet, Viola, and Orchestra in E minor, Op. 88, is a composition by Max Bruch which was composed in 1911. It premiered on 5 March 1912 in Wilhelmshaven by the piece's dedicatees, violist Willy Hess and the composer's son and clarinet soloist, Max Felix Bruch. However, the score was not published until 1942, 23 years after the composer's death.

Bruch also arranged the solo clarinet part for violin.

== Music ==
The concerto is scored for solo clarinet in A and viola, two flutes, two oboes, cor anglais, two clarinets in A, two bassoons, four horns in F, two trumpets in B♭, timpani, and strings.

The concerto is written in three movements:

1. Andante con moto (E minor, B major, 4/4)
2. Allegro moderato (G major, B minor, 3/4)
3. Allegro molto (E major, G major, 2/4)

All three movements feature the Swedish folksong "Ack Värmeland Du Sköna." A typical performance lasts approximately 20 minutes.

== Recordings ==
- Bruch: Concerto for Clarinet, Viola, and Orchestra; Eight Pieces for Clarinet, Viola, and Piano; Schumann: Märchenerzählungen / Tommaso Placidi (conductor), Steven Kanoff, Paul Coletti, Hanover Radio Philharmonic / 2005 / Asv Living Era
- The Clarinet in Concert / Alun Francis (conductor), Thea King, Nobuko Imai, London Symphony Orchestra / 1997 / Hyperion
- Bruch: Works for Clarinet and Viola; Concerto for Clarinet, Viola and Orchestra in E minor; Eight Pieces for Clarinet, Viola and Piano; Romance for Viola and orchestra in F major / Paul Meyer, Gérard Caussé, François-René Duchâble (piano), Kent Nagano (conductor) / 1988–1989 / Apex
- In the Borderland of Romanticism / Mats Liljefors (conductor), Dimitri Ashkenazy, Anton Kholodenko, Baltic Symphony Orchestra / 1996 / Artemis
