= St Michael Wood Street =

Coordinates: 51°30′56″N 0°5′41.5″W

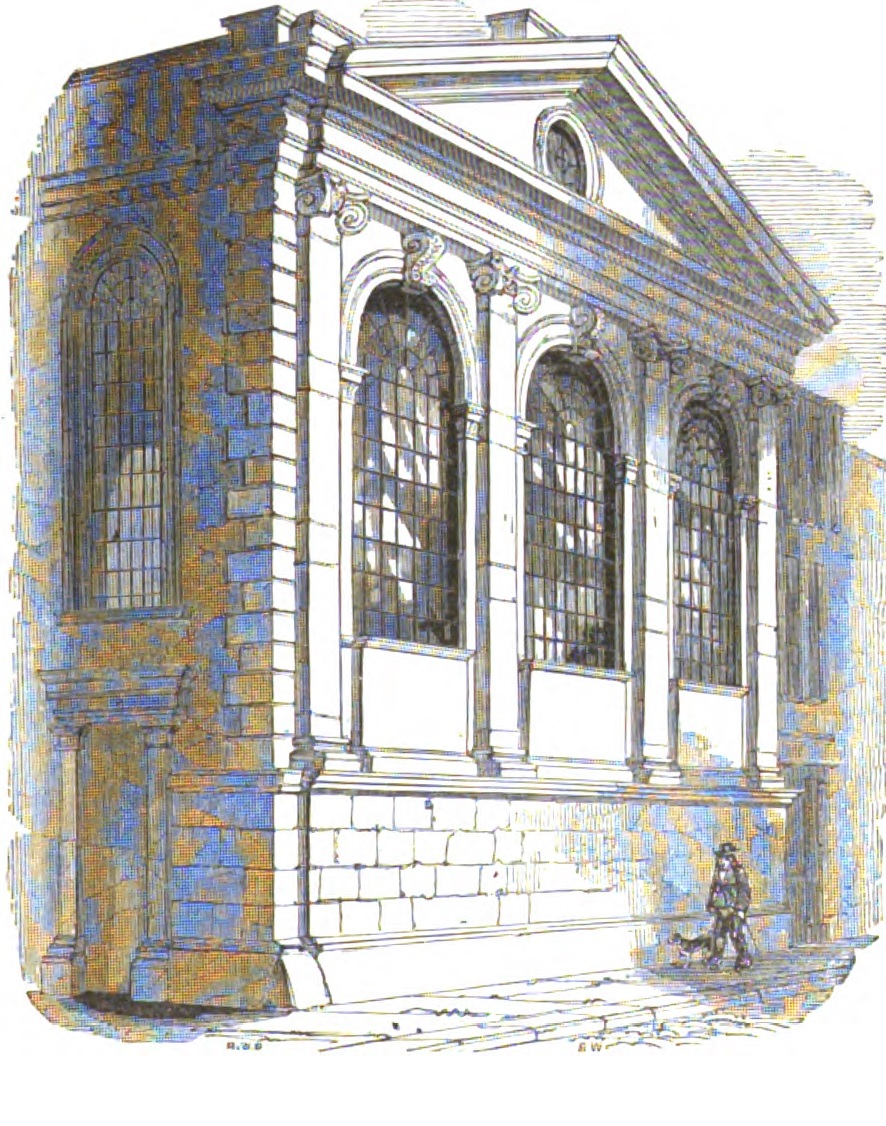
- St Michael Wood Street
- Location: London
- Country: England
- Denomination: Church of England

Architecture
- Architect: Christopher Wren
- Style: Baroque
- Demolished: 1897

St Michael's Wood Street was a church and parish of medieval origin in Cripplegate Ward in the City of London, and is first mentioned in 1225 as St. Michael de Wudestrate. It stood on the west side of Wood Street, initially with a frontage on Huggin Lane but later on Wood Street itself.

== The medieval church ==
After King James IV of Scotland was killed at the Battle of Flodden in 1513, it is said that his head was brought to London and later buried in the crypt of this church. John Stow admired the building, and called it a "proper thing."

== Rebuilding ==
The church was destroyed in the Great Fire of London, and after some pressure it was rebuilt by Sir Christopher Wren in 1673.

The main facade toward Wood Street was described by Godwin as "a pleasing and well-proportioned morceau of Italian architecture", with four Ionic columns above a stylobate, supporting an entablature and pediment. The west side, towards Huggin Lane, was much plainer. The tower was originally 90 ft high; Henry Thomas, writing in 1828, noted that the tower seemed to have survived from the previous building, and that it had recently received a spire, increasing the overall height to 120 feet.

George Godwin described the interior of the church as "a large and well-lighted parallelogram with a coved ceiling, but ... not ecclesiastical in any respect in its general appearance". The building was restored in 1831, at which time the tower was opened up into the interior of the church. There was a gallery at the west end and a reredos at the east end, with paintingsof Moses and Aaron.

The organ was built by Thomas Elliot in 1800: the most noted organist was Dr Henry Hiles, who served during 1859.

== Demolition ==
In 1854 the declining residential population led to proposals to reduce the number of churches within the "Square Mile" – a procedure the church's vicar had himself proposed. The church was eventually demolished under the auspices of the Union of Benefices Act 1860 in 1897, and many bodies were disinterred from the churchyard and reburied at Brookwood Cemetery.

The parish was then united with St Alban Wood Street, and, after the destruction of that church in World War II, with St Vedast Foster Lane.

The site has undergone several redevelopments: between 1994 and 2016 it was a pub called the Red Herring.

== Ministers of the church ==
- John Ive, fl 1399
- Arthur Jackson (minister), c.1624

== Bibliography ==
- 'Church of England, Parish of St. Michael Wood Street. - Assessment of the annual tithes of the joint parishes of St. Michael Wood St, 1671'. - M0014588CL cited in City of London Parish Registers Guide 4

== See also ==
- List of Christopher Wren churches in London
- List of churches rebuilt after the Great Fire but since demolished
