= Royal Northern College of Music =

Music school in Manchester, England

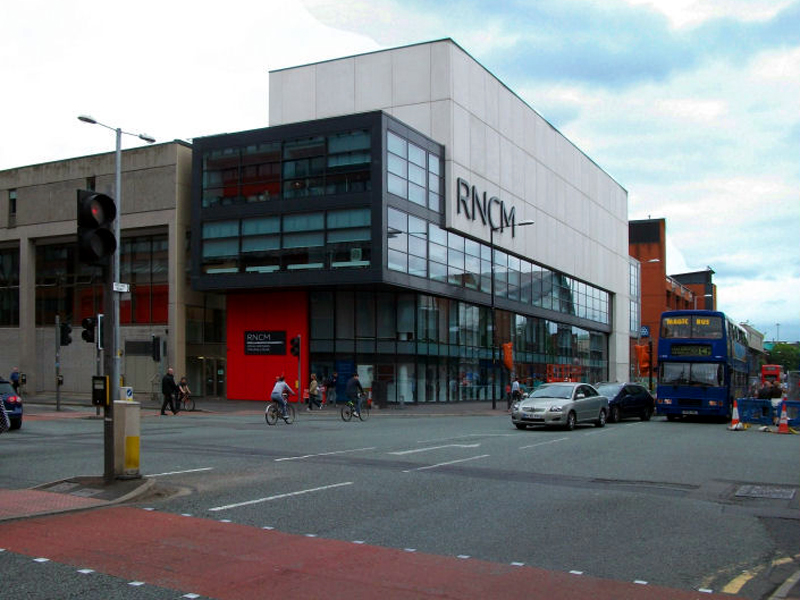
- The RNCM building on Oxford Road
- Other name: RNCM
- Type: Public, Conservatoire
- Established: 1973 by the merger of the Northern School of Music (established 1920) and the Royal Manchester College of Music (established 1893)
- Affiliations: University of Manchester; Associated Board of the Royal Schools of Music; Conservatoires UK; European Association of Conservatoires
- Endowment: £23.3 million (2025)
- Budget: £28.7 million (2024/25)
- President: Sir John Tomlinson
- Principal: Professor Linda Merrick
- Administrative staff: 320 teaching staff
- Students: 935 (2024/25)
- Undergraduates: 585 (2024/25)
- Postgraduates: 350 (2024/25)
- Location: 124 Oxford Road, Manchester M13 9RD, Manchester, England, UK; 53°28′07″N 2°14′11″W
- Campus: Urban
- Website: rncm.ac.uk
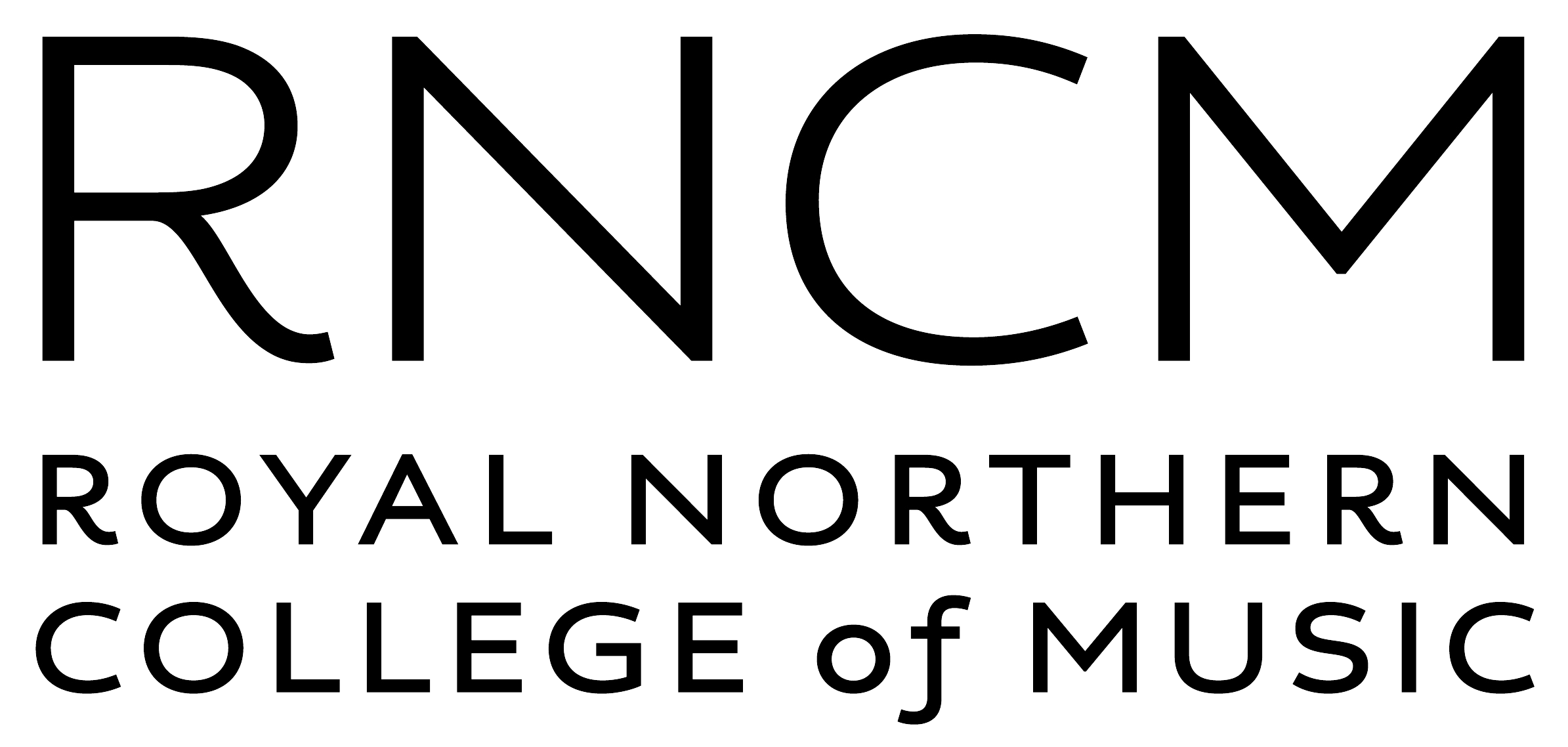

The Royal Northern College of Music (RNCM) is a conservatoire in Manchester, England. It is one of four conservatoires associated with the Associated Board of the Royal Schools of Music. In addition to being a centre of music education, the RNCM is a busy and diverse public performance venue.

== History ==
The RNCM has a history dating back to the 19th century and the establishment of the Royal Manchester College of Music (RMCM). In 1858, Sir Charles Hallé founded the Hallé orchestra in Manchester, and by the early 1890s had raised the idea of a music college in the city. Following an appeal for support, a building on Ducie Street was secured, Hallé was appointed Principal and Queen Victoria conferred the Royal title. The RMCM opened its doors to 80 students in 1893, rising to 117 by the end of the first year.

Less than four decades later, in 1920, the Northern School of Music was established (initially as a branch of the Matthay School of Music), and for many years the two institutions coexisted. It wasn't until 1955 that NSM principal Hilda Collins, in recognising the importance of performance in training students, met RMCM principal Frederic Cox to raise the question of merging. Discussions continued until September 1967, when a joint committee was formed to oversee plans to combine the two colleges.

The RNCM was formed in 1972, moving to its purpose-built home on Oxford Road in 1973. Its first principal was John Manduell, who had been a music producer and administrator at the BBC; he held the role until 1996, and the Telegraph later wrote "under his energetic direction, it became one of the leading musical academies in Europe, if not the world".

== Building ==
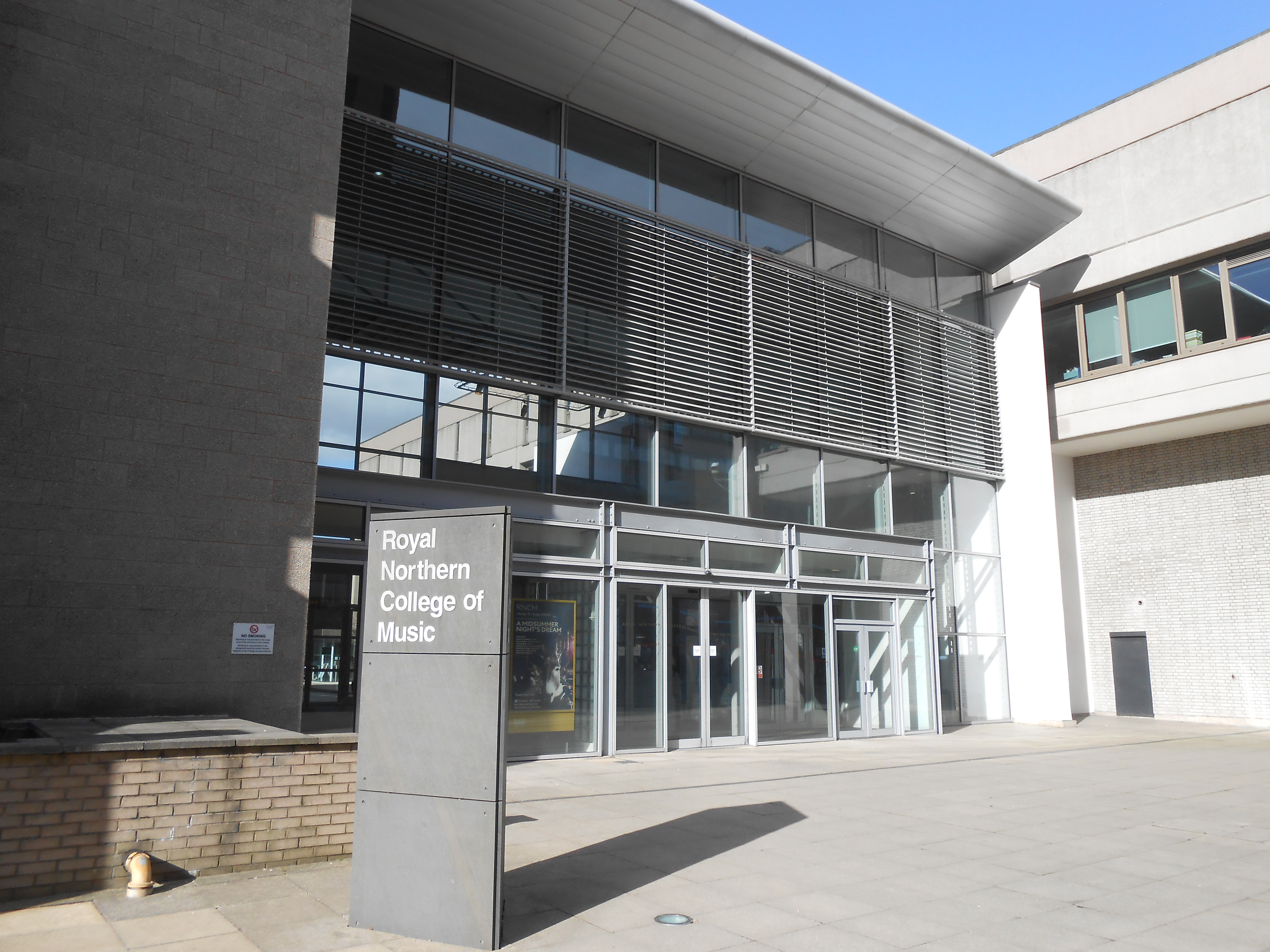
The RNCM western entrance, Booth Street (added 1997–98)

The college building was built on the corner of Oxford Road and Booth Street West between 1968 and 1973 by architects Bickerdike, Allen, and Rich. The two-storey rectangular concrete structure is fronted by tall glazed bays recessed behind an array of square concrete pillars. Originally an elevated walkway ran along the Oxford Road side, connecting the building to the former neighbouring Precinct Centre via a bridge over Booth Street East. Truncated sections of this walkway were the vestigial evidence of an unrealised plan to create a network of high-level "boulevards", providing pedestrian routes on concrete stilts above street level from the RNCM to neighbouring buildings, and extending as far as Hulme and Ancoats. Only the bridges over Oxford Road and Booth Street East were ever constructed.

In 1997–98, the RNCM building was extended by architects Mills Beaumont Leavey Channon, with a new entrance built on the western side, and the walkway was removed.

A major refurbishment of the Concert Hall was undertaken between December 2013 and September 2014 by Scott Hughes Design.

== Academics ==
The college offers both undergraduate (BMus and joint MusB/GRNCM course with the University of Manchester in any of the five specialisations offered) and postgraduate taught programmes (PGDip, MMus) in musical performance and composition. In association with Manchester Metropolitan University the college offers research degrees (MPhil, PhD) in musical performance, composition, musicology and music psychology as part of its Graduate School and also confers awards at Companion, Fellowship (FRNCM), Honorary Member (HRNCM), and Associate (ARNCM) level.

In January 2005, the RNCM was awarded £4.5 million by the Higher Education Funding Council for England to become a recognised Centre for Excellence in Teaching and Learning (CETL), the only UK conservatoire to be selected.

The RNCM currently has 800+ students and 300+ teaching staff, including part-time visiting professors. Many of the staff also teach at Junior RNCM, a Saturday music school for talented young musicians aged eight to 18.

=== Faculties ===
The college is divided into 6 schools by area of specialisation.

- School of Composition
- School of Keyboard Studies
- School of Strings
- School of Vocal Studies and Opera
- School of Wind, Brass and Percussion
- Popular Music

There is also a Conducting department within its Graduate School.

== Collection of Historic Musical Instruments ==
The RNCM also holds a collection of historic musical instruments. The collection is an amalgamation of collections originally assembled by Dr Henry Watson (1846–1911), Josiah Thomas Chapman (1843–1907), and the city of Manchester. Collection holdings are listed online as part of the MINIM-UK project.

== Student life ==
The RNCM students' union (RNCMSU) is the main student-run organisation. Besides representing the study body, the RNCMSU also plans and organises social programmes and provides peer support for students. The RNCMSU is member of the National Union of Students.

There is a residential hall, Sir Charles Groves Hall, next to the campus. Alternatively, students may choose to rent a flat at the Manchester Student Homes, a provider of housing for university students in Manchester run by the Universities.

== Notable alumni ==
- Don Airey (born 1948), keyboard player/songwriter
- Christopher Ball (1936 – 2022), composer
- Alex Banfield (born 1990), tenor
- Barry Banks (born 1960), tenor
- Daniel Bartholomew-Poyser, conductor
- Tim Benjamin (born 1975), composer
- Sir Harrison Birtwistle (1934 – 2022), composer
- Cathal Breslin (born 1978), pianist
- Peter Butterfield, conductor and tenor
- Arthur Butterworth (1923 – 2014), composer
- Telalit Charsky (born 1986), cellist
- Jon Christos (born 1976), singer
- Conor Collins, visual artist
- Chris Craker (born 1959), clarinettist
- Sir Peter Maxwell Davies (1934 – 2016) , composer and Master of the Queen's Music
- Peter Donohoe (born 1953), pianist
- Philip Duffy (born 1943), composer
- Jane Eaglen (born 1960), soprano
- David Ellis (1933 – 2023), composer
- Catherine Foster (born 1975), soprano
- Alexander Goehr (1932 – 2024), composer
- Anthony Goldstone (1944 – 2017), pianist
- Stjepan Hauser (born 1986), Croatian cellist
- Jean Hindmarsh (born 1934), soprano
- Simon Holt (born 1958), composer
- Carly Hopkinson (born 1989), classical/opera singer/songwriter and Classic Brit Awards nominee
- Sir Stephen Hough (born 1961), pianist
- Elgar Howarth (1935 – 2025), conductor
- Gary Hughes (born 1964), singer/songwriter
- Darren Jeffery (born 1976), bass-baritone
- Olga Jegunova (born 1984), pianist
- Adam Johnson, pianist and conductor
- Sir Peter Jonas (1946 – 2020), historian of music
- Howard Jones (born 1955), singer/songwriter
- Simon Keenlyside (born 1959), baritone
- Mary Ann Kennedy (born 1967), singer
- Grant Kirkhope (born 1962), composer
- Eduard Kunz (born 1980), pianist
- Dane Lam, conductor
- Alison Lambert (born 1977), clarinettist
- Jeffrey Lawton (1938 – 2018), tenor, tutor, fellow
- Wilbur Lin, conductor
- Bernard Longley (born 1955), Archbishop of Birmingham
- Steven Mead (born 1962), euphonium player
- Sarah Oates (born 1976), violinist
- John Ogdon (1937 – 1989), pianist and composer
- Annette Bryn Parri (1962 – 2025), pianist
- Rosalind Plowright (born 1949), soprano/mezzo soprano
- Julie Price (born 1963), bassoonist
- Christine Rice, mezzo soprano
- Rafael Rojas (1962 – 2022), tenor
- Martin Roscoe (born 1952), pianist
- Andy Scott (born 1966), saxophonist and composer
- Gregg Scott, violinist
- Ronald Stevenson (1928 – 2015), composer and pianist
- Gordon Stewart (born 1952), organist
- Iyad Sughayer (born 1993), pianist
- Benedict Taylor (born 1982), violist & composer
- Ben Thapa (1982 – 2024), tenor
- Sir John Tomlinson (born 1946), singer
- Ian Vine (born 1974), composer
- Kristofer Wåhlander (born 1974), conductor
- Westside Cowboy (formed 2023), rock band

== Directors of the RNCM ==
1. John Manduell (1973–1996)
2. Edward Gregson (1996–2008)
3. Jonty Stockdale (2008–2012)
4. Linda Merrick (2013–present)

== See also ==
- Conservatoires UK
- Bridgewater Hall
- Chetham's School of Music
