= Ted Rudd (rugby union) =

England international rugby union player

- Full name: Edward Lawrence Rudd
- Born: 28 September 1944 (age 82) Aigburth, Liverpool, England
- School: St Edward's College
- University: Wadham College, Oxford

Rugby union career
- Position: Wing
International career
Years	Team	Apps	(Points)
1965–66	England	6	(0)

Edward Lawrence Rudd (born 28 September 1944) is an English former international rugby union player.

A Liverpool native, Rudd attended St Edward's College and during his three year's with their first XV earned Lancashire Schoolboys representative honours. He undertook further studies at Wadham College, Oxford.

Rudd, a speedy winger, became the first player to score a try against the 1963–64 All Blacks when he turned out for Oxford University in the tour's opening fixture. An Oxford blue, Rudd scored two tries in the 1964 Varsity match and had a third disallowed. He also played rugby for the Liverpool Football Club.

Capped six times by England, Rudd came into the side for the 1965 Five Nations and missed only the France fixture, due to suspected appendicitis. He made a further three appearances in the 1965 Five Nations.

== See also ==
- List of England national rugby union players
