= Hiles, Wood County, Wisconsin =

Town of Hiles, Wisconsin
- Town
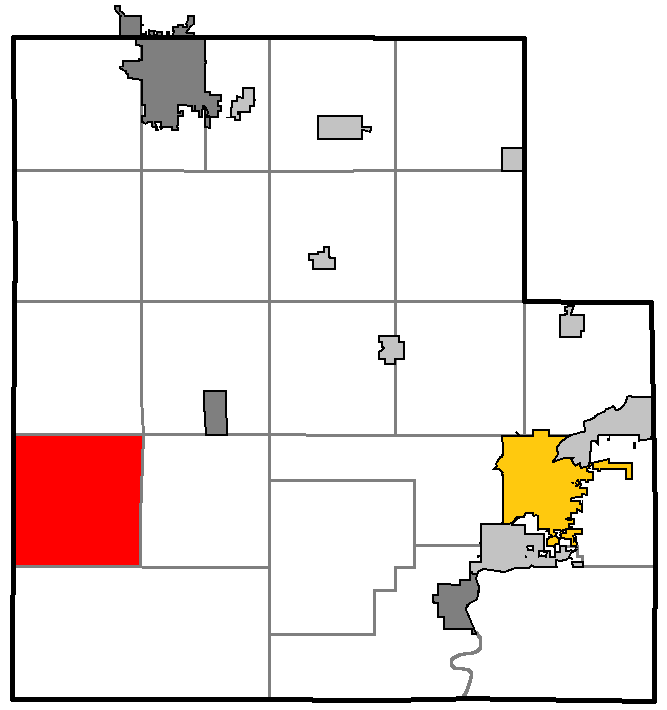
- Location of the Town of Hiles, Wood County, Wisconsin

- Location of Wood County, Wisconsin
- Coordinates: 44°22′26″N 90°14′50″W
- Country: United States
- State: Wisconsin
- County: Wood

Area
  - Total: 35.3 sq mi (91.5 km^{2})
  - Land: 34.8 sq mi (90.2 km^{2})
  - Water: 0.50 sq mi (1.3 km^{2})
- Elevation: 974 ft (297 m)

Population (2020)
  - Total: 152
  - Density: 4.36/sq mi (1.69/km^{2})
- Time zone: UTC-6 (Central (CST))
  - Summer (DST): UTC-5 (CDT)
- Area codes: 715 & 534
- FIPS code: 55-34675
- GNIS feature ID: 1583391
- PLSS township: T22N R2E

The Town of Hiles is in Wood County, Wisconsin, United States. Its population was 152 at the 2020 census.

== Geography ==
According to the United States Census Bureau, Hiles has an area of 35.3 square miles (91.5 km^{2}), of which 34.8 square miles (90.2 km^{2}) is land and 0.5 square miles (1.2 km^{2}) of it (1.36%) is water.

== History ==
The outline of the six-mile square that would become the Town of Hiles was first surveyed in the summer of 1851 by a crew working for the US government. Around New Year's Day of 1852, another crew marked all of its the section corners of the six-mile square, traversing the woods and swamps, measuring with chain and compass. The deputy surveyor filed this general description:

The surface of this Township is level, about one half is composed of Tamarack Swamp, the remaining Portion low wetland, but a small Portion could be made fit for cultivation (?) by drainage. The whole surface is covered with a very thick coat of Timber Small(?) Pine, Tamarack, Maple and Birch, undergrowth of Alder witch Hazel, and water Bech very thick, soil Hard Pan from the Middle of the Township North and East local attraction was found to very considerable extent, so much so that several lines were run with back sights(?) and measurement alone, Fox River (called by residents East Branch of Black River.) runs near the Center of the Township – from the N.E. to N.W. corner, average width 100 links Rapid(?) current, average depth about two feet.

The current town of Hiles was organized in 1901. It was named for businessman and land speculator George Hiles, who owned half of the land in the town before the turn of the century.

== Demographics ==
As of the 2000 census, there were 188 people, 63 households, and 51 families in Hiles, and its population density was 5.4 people per square mile (2.1/km^{2}). There were 88 housing units, with an average density of 2.5 per square mile (1.0/km^{2}). Its racial makeup was 97.87% White, 2.66% Hispanic, 0.53% African American, 0.53% from other races, and 1.06% from two or more races.

There were 63 households, out of which 42.9% had children under the age of 18; 77.8% were married couples living together, 4.8% had a female householder with no husband present, and 17.5% were non-families. 15.9% of households consisted of individuals, with 11.1% 65 years of age or older. The average household size was 2.98 people, and the average family size 3.31.

33.5% of residents were 18 or younger, 3.7% were 18–24, 28.7% were 25–44, 20.2% were 45–64, and 13.8% were 65 and older. The median age was 38 years. For every 100 females, there were 111.2 males. For every 100 females age 18 and over, there were 108.3 males.

The town's median household income was $38,000, and the median family income $39,375. Males had a median income of $31,250 versus $18,333 for females. The per capita income was $15,054. About 9.6% of families and 8.6% of the population were below the poverty line, including 11.5% of those under 18 and none of those 65 or over.
