= Osia Joslyn Hiles =

American philanthropist and poet

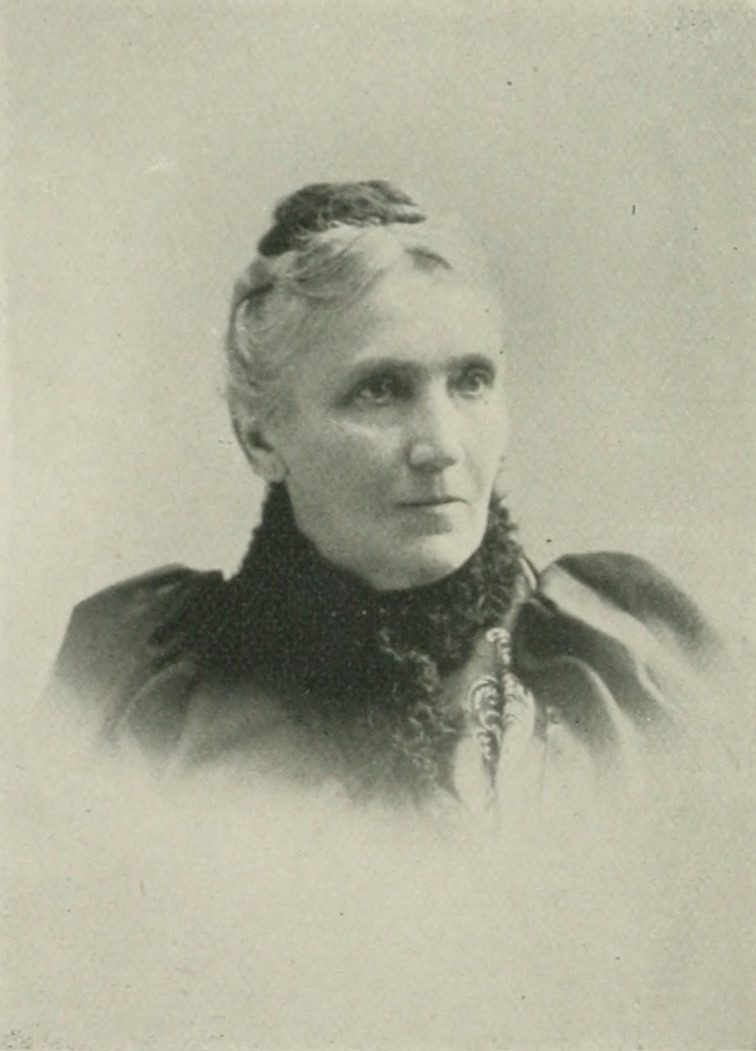
Osia Joslyn Hiles, A woman of the century

Osia Joslyn Hiles (born February 13, 1832) was an American philanthropist and poet.

== Early life ==
Osia Joslyn was born near Batavia, New York, on February 13, 1832. Her father's name was Joslyn, and his family were originally Bostonians and related to the Breckenridges of Kentucky. Her mother was a Sprague, a first cousin of President Millard Fillmore. During the childhood of Osia Joslyn her father moved to Erie County, New York.

== Career ==
Since 1884 she lived, in Milwaukee, Wisconsin, and was associated with many large philanthropies in the city. One of the earliest was the Home for the Friendless, of which she was an incorporator and whose constitution she helped to frame. She played a significant role in the establishment of the Wisconsin Humane Society.

The flourishing Woman's Club of Wisconsin, in Milwaukee, was also promoted in essays written by Hiles. She was its first vice-president and the president of the ladies' art and science class.

One of the first stock companies of women for revenue owes its existence to Hiles. She originated and propounded to the club the idea of a stock company of women for the building of a permanent woman's club home, which building idea was afterwards extended by the stock company to facilities for revenue other than that derived from the club.

She was one of the active incorporators of the Wisconsin Training School for nurses, and had several times been a delegate to the National Conference of Charities and Reforms.

She passed in history as an agitator of the wrongs of the Indians. At first she gave her time to the Mission Indian work in California, personally visiting nearly every reservation and Mexican land grant in southern California. Twice she went to the Interior Department and to the President in the interest of the Indians. She pled their cause in the East and assisted in sending legal help for their protection. Hiles. being a woman of wealth, was able to put money as well as zeal into her philanthropic work. When the Wisconsin Indian Association was formed, she was made secretary. Its labors were largely legislative, and Hiles used her influence in helping to defeat some bills, in originating and pushing some beneficent ones, and in creating harmony of action with branches in other States.

She was a literary woman and a poet. She published in various periodicals. She traveled extensively, both in America and Europe. She was a lover of art, of nature and of humanity.

== Personal life ==
At the age of nineteen Osia Joslyn went to Illinois, where, two years later, she married John Hiles, a man born in England in a highly cultured family.

After the death of her husband, and while her son was completing preparatory and college courses, Hiles did all the outside work of her deceased husband's extensive estate.

Her residences in Pewaukee and Milwaukee served as seasonal centers of hospitality and cultural activity, hosting gatherings and promoting the arts during the summer and winter months.
