= Kristofer Wåhlander =

Swedish conductor

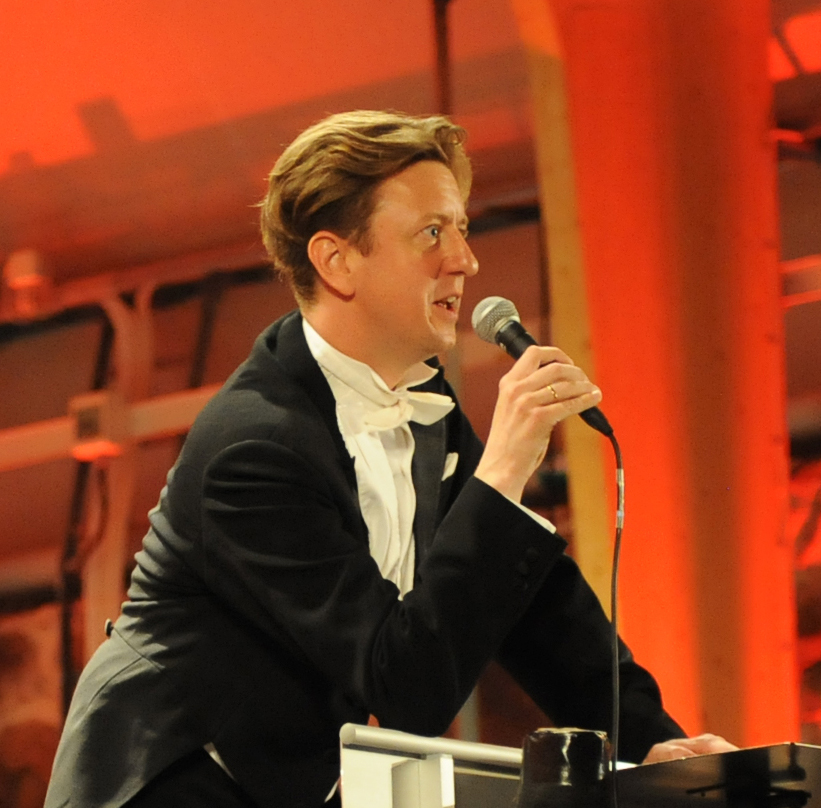
Kristofer Wåhlander (Photo: Fredrik Liljegren)

Kristofer Wåhlander (born 12 November 1974, in Loddekopinge in southern Sweden), is a Swedish conductor mainly working in Russia. He founded the St. Petersburg Festival Orchestra in Russia in 2001 and recorded Tchaikovsky's 5th symphony on the La Forza label with the same orchestra.

== Education ==
Kristofer Wåhlander studied at the Royal Northern College of Music in Manchester and at the St. Petersburg State Conservatory in Russia.

== Activities in Russia ==
Wåhlander served as artistic director for the Nordic Music Festival in St. Petersburg from 2004 to 2007.

In 2008, he founded the Music at the Fort festival which turned the former military island of Flakfort into a festival of classical music.

Has also worked with the St. Petersburg Philharmonic Orchestra, the Kaliningrad Symphony Orchestra, the Iceland Symphony Orchestra, St. Petersburg State Symphony Orchestra, The St. Petersburg State Hermitage Orchestra and the academy of the Mariinsky Theater.

== In Sweden and Denmark ==
Outside Russia, Wåhlander has worked with the South Juthland Symphony Orchestra in Denmark.

He was the subject for the one-hour documentary film 'Music - a matter of life or death' by the filmmaker Viveca Ringmar, broadcast on Swedish national television SVT in 2006.

Since 2010, Wåhlander directs and conducts the professional Lundaland Philharmonic Orchestra in the south of Sweden.
