= George Hiles =

American businessman and politician

George Hiles (October 3, 1825 – March 8, 1896) was a businessman, land speculator, and politician.

Hiles was born in Farmington, Michigan. He moved to Wisconsin in 1844 settling in Baraboo where he operated a sawmill. In 1850, he moved to Wood County, where he helped found the sawmill town Dexterville, invested in the mills of Pittsville, and owned a mineral water spring in Arcadia.

He represented Marathon and Wood counties in the Wisconsin State Assembly as a Democrat in 1867. He was defeated by George R. Gardner for the seat in 1883.

In the 1870s and 1880s he became involved in railroads. He built a major portion of the Green Bay, Winona and St. Paul Railroad, and constructed the Milwaukee, Dexterville, and Northern Railroad which was later acquired by the Chicago, Milwaukee, St. Paul and Pacific Railroad. Hiles moved to Milwaukee, Wisconsin in 1886. He died in 1896 and is buried in Dexterville Cemetery in Dexterville.

The town and community of Hiles were named in his honor in 1901.
