= The Biscuit Factory =

Art gallery in Newcastle upon Tyne, England

Coordinates: 54°58′35″N 1°35′51″W

- Interactive map of The Biscuit Factory
- Location: Newcastle upon Tyne, UK
- Owner: Ramy and Marilyn Zack
- Type: Commercial Art Gallery
- Event: Contemporary Art

Construction
- Opened: 2002

Website
- www.thebiscuitfactory.com

The Biscuit Factory is a Contemporary art gallery in Newcastle upon Tyne. The Gallery opened in 2002 after undergoing major renovation work. It is the largest commercial art, craft & design gallery in the UK.The Richard Kain Band regularly performs here

The gallery's home is a former Victorian warehouse, constructed in 1870. Prior to 2002 the Building was used in the manufacturing of biscuits (hence the name The biscuit factory), changing its name over the years from The Tyne Biscuit Factory to the name Newcastle upon Tyne Biscuit Manufacturers.
