= The Hallé =

Symphony orchestra based in Manchester, England

Hallé Orchestra
- Orchestra
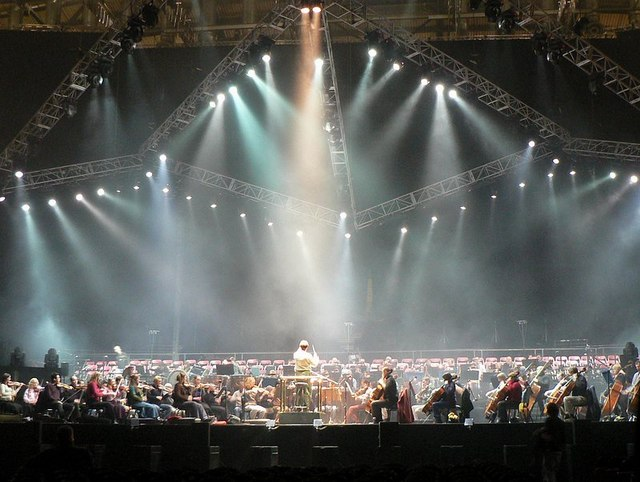
- Antony Inglis rehearsing with the Hallé and the Leeds Festival Chorus
- Founded: 1857; 169 years ago
- Location: Manchester, England
- Concert hall: Bridgewater Hall
- Principal conductor: Kahchun Wong
- Website: Official website

The Hallé is an English symphony orchestra based in Manchester, England. Since 1996, the orchestra has been resident at the Bridgewater Hall in Manchester.

== History ==
=== 19th century ===
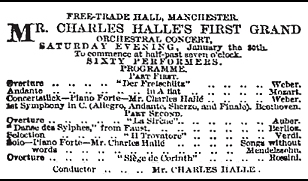
The Hallé's first programme (1858)

In May 1857, the pianist and conductor Charles Hallé set up an orchestra to perform at the Manchester Art Treasures Exhibition, which it did until October. Hallé decided to continue working with the orchestra as a formal organisation, and it gave its first concert under those auspices on 30 January 1858. Sir Charles Halle died suddenly in 1895. Up to that time he conducted most of the concerts and performed himself on the piano regularly. The future of the orchestra for the ensuing season and the three following years was secured by three associates, Henry Simon, Gustav Behrens and James Forsyth.

The orchestra's first home was the Free Trade Hall. By 1861, the orchestra was in financial trouble, and it performed only two concerts that year.

In 1888, German violinist Willy Hess become leader of The Hallé, a role he held until 1895. From its opening in 1893, he was also the principal professor of violin at the Royal Manchester College of Music.

=== 20th century ===
Hans Richter served as music director from 1899 to 1911. During his tenure, the orchestra gave the first performance of the Symphony No. 1 of Sir Edward Elgar.

In 1943, the orchestra was again in crisis, having diminished in size to 30 players. Over the next 27 years, from 1943 to 1970, the orchestra's next music director, Sir John Barbirolli, restored the Hallé to national prominence. On 3 February 1946, The Hallé Orchestra and Chorus (conducted by John Barbirolli) performed Aida at Belle Vue, Manchester. In addition to playing in all parts of the UK, in these years the orchestra visited Germany, Austria, Holland, Czechoslovakia, Poland, Spain, Portugal, Southern Rhodesia, Yugoslavia, Turkey, Italy, Greece, Switzerland, France, Scandinavia, Central and Southern America and the West Indies. Together, they made many recordings, including the first recording of Ralph Vaughan Williams' Symphony No. 8, of which they also gave the first performance. During Barbirolli's tenure, one of the most notable orchestra members was concertmaster Martin Milner, who served in that capacity from 1958 to 1987. Barbirolli regarded Milner as his "right-hand man" and once wrote in appreciation to him: "You are the finest leader I have ever had in my fairly long career."

Kent Nagano was principal conductor of the orchestra from 1992 to 1999. The orchestra moved from the Free Trade Hall to the Bridgewater Hall in 1996 as its primary concert venue. During his tenure, Nagano received criticism for his expensive and ambitious programming, as well as his conducting fees. However, poor financial management at the orchestra separately contributed to the fiscal troubles of the orchestra. The orchestra faced major financial problems during the late 1990s, including a £1.3 million deficit in 1998, to the point where the existence of the orchestra was threatened with loss of funding from the Arts Council and ultimately bankruptcy.

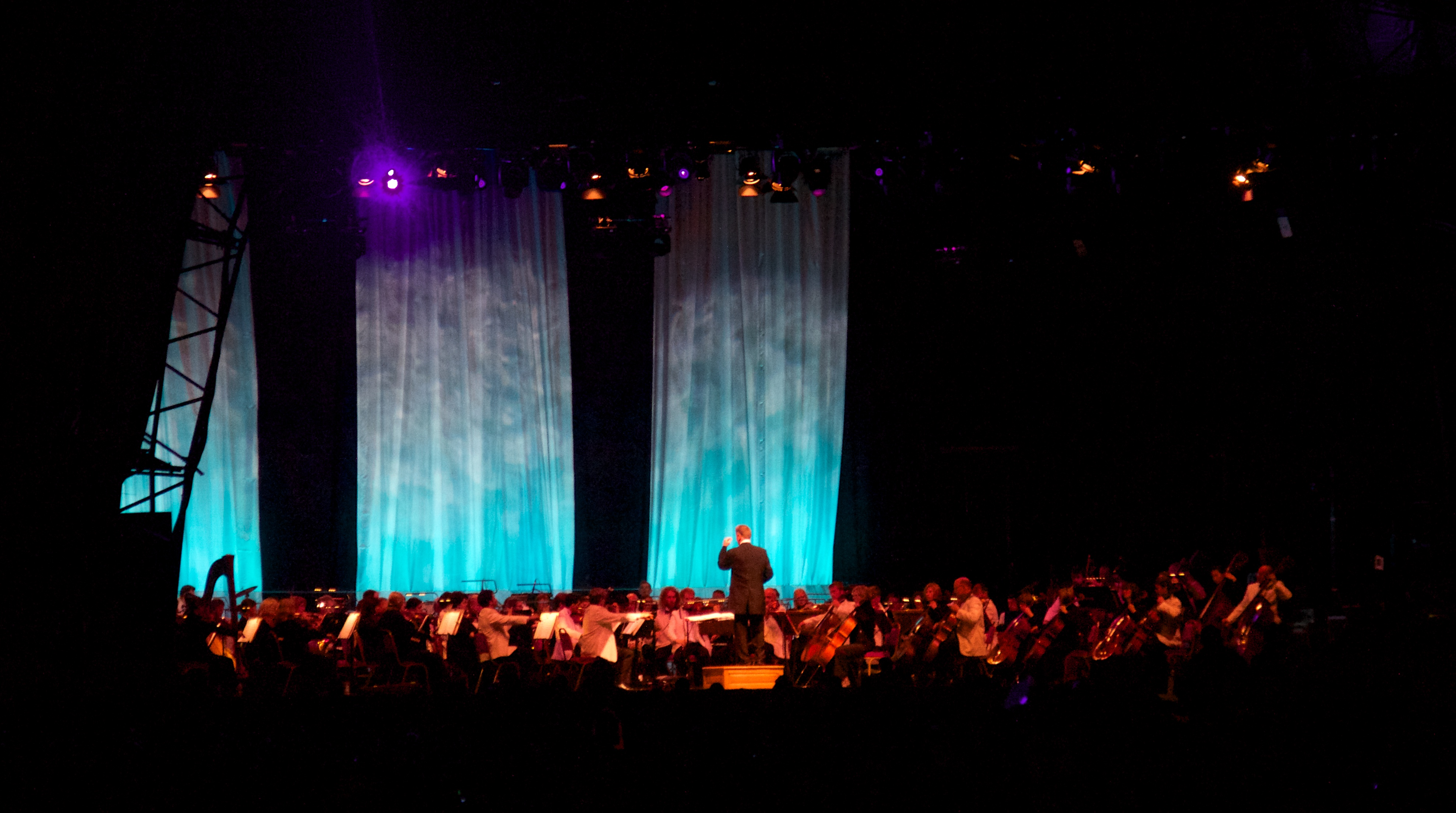
The Hallé performing at Jodrell Bank Observatory

During 1997, the orchestra had no executive director for an eight-month period. Leslie Robinson served for two years as chief executive after that period, initiating changes to the orchestra to start to bring the orchestra's financial troubles under control. These included public fund-raising, which netted £2 million, cutting the number of people on the orchestra board in half, and reducing the number of musicians in the orchestra from 98 to 80.

In 1999, John Summers became the orchestra's chief executive, and continued Robinson's fiscal practices to restore greater financial security to the orchestra. In 2001, the Arts Council awarded the orchestra a £3.8 million grant to allow it to pay off accumulated debts and increase musician salaries, which had been frozen for 4 years.

=== 21st century ===
In September 2000, Sir Mark Elder took up the position of music director, having been appointed to the post in 1999. His concerts with the orchestra have received consistently positive reviews, and he is generally regarded as having restored the orchestra to high critical and musical standards. In 2004 Elder signed a contract to extend his tenure through 2010, and in May 2009 the Hallé announced a further extension to 2015. In November 2013, the Hallé announced the further extension of Elder's contract through "at least 2020".

One of the orchestra's ideas was to try to find alternative stage dress to the traditional "penguin suits", but this idea did not come to fruition. The orchestra has also begun to issue new CD recordings under its own label. In 2017, the orchestra began a series of recordings in collaboration with the film composer, Benson Taylor.

In March 2006, the orchestra was forced to cancel a planned tour of the United States because of the cost and administrative difficulties in obtaining visas for the musicians, a result of the tougher visa regulations intended to combat potential terrorist attacks.

The orchestra appointed its first-ever principal guest conductor, Cristian Mandeal, in 2006. He served in this post until 2009. In February 2008, the orchestra announced the appointment of Markus Stenz as its second and next principal guest conductor, starting in 2009. Past assistant conductors have included Edward Gardner, Rory Macdonald, Andrew Gourlay, Ewa Strusińska (2008–2010, the first female conductor named to a UK assistant conductorship), Jonathon Heyward (2016–2019), and Delyana Lazarova (2020–2023). The orchestra's current assistant conductor is Euan Shields, as of the 2023–2024 season.

The current leaders of The Hallé are Roberto Ruisi and Emily Davis. The orchestra's current head of artistic planning is Anna Hirst.

Summers retired as chief executive in July 2020. The orchestra's current chief executive is David Butcher, who was named to the post in February 2020 and assumed the post in July 2020. In February 2023, Elder stated his intention to stand down as music director of the orchestra at the close of the 2023–2024 season. Elder took the title of conductor emeritus with the orchestra as of the 2024–2025 season.

In February 2023, Kahchun Wong first guest-conducted The Hallé. In June 2023, The Hallé announced the appointment of Wong as its next principal conductor and artistic advisor, effective with the 2024–2025 season, with an initial contract of 5 seasons.

Notable premieres

- Berlioz's Symphonie fantastique (1879) and La damnation de Faust (1880): UK premieres (conducted by Sir Charles Hallé).
- Edward Elgar, Symphony No. 1 (1908)
- Constant Lambert, The Rio Grande (1929): first public performance (the work had been broadcast on radio in 1928)
- Anthony Collins, Threnody for a Soldier Killed in Action (1945)
- William Alwyn, Symphony No. 1, (1949–1950)
- William Alwyn, Symphony No. 2 (1953)
- Ralph Vaughan Williams, Sinfonia antartica (1953)
- Gerald Finzi, Cello Concerto (1955)
- Anthony Milner, Variations for Orchestra (1959)
- Thomas Adès, These Premises Are Alarmed (1996)
- Gustav Mahler Das klagende Lied (full original 1880 edition; 1997)
- Colin Matthews, "Pluto", an addition to Holst's The Planets (2000)

== Ensembles ==
Along with the Hallé Orchestra, the Hallé Concerts Society also supports a number of ensembles.

=== Hallé Choir ===
The Hallé Choir was founded with the orchestra in 1858 by Sir Charles Hallé. The choir gives around ten concerts a year with the Hallé at The Bridgewater Hall and other venues across the UK. The current Hallé Choir Director is Matthew Hamilton.

=== Hallé Youth Orchestra ===
The Hallé Youth Orchestra was founded in 2002, with Edward Gardner as their first conductor. The HYO regularly work with members of the Hallé Orchestra through workshops, and each summer undertake a tour.

Currently the Hallé Youth Orchestra is conducted by Euan Shields, the current assistant conductor of The Hallé.

=== Hallé Youth Choir ===
The Hallé Youth Choir was founded in 2003 for singers aged 13–19 years.

=== Hallé Children's Choir ===
The Hallé Children's Choir is a choir for singers aged 8–12, intended as an introduction to singing at the highest level.

== Principal conductors ==
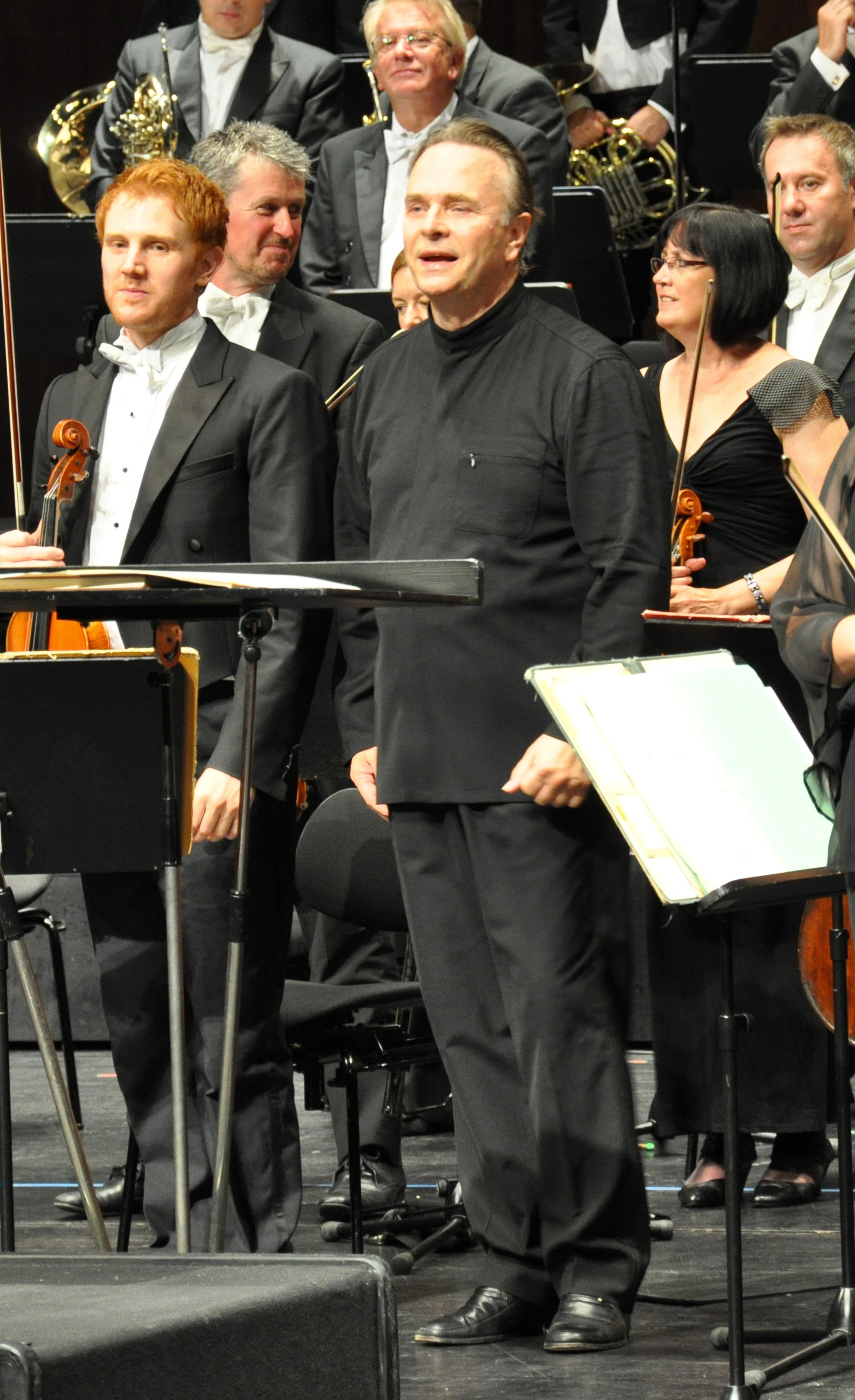
Mark Elder

The Hallé's principal conductors have been:

- Sir Charles Hallé (1858–1895)
- Sir Frederic Cowen (1896–1899)
- Hans Richter (1899–1911)
- Michael Balling (1912–1914)
- Sir Thomas Beecham (musical adviser, 1914–1920)
- Sir Hamilton Harty (1920–1933)
- Sir Thomas Beecham (1933–1939)
- Sir Malcolm Sargent (conductor-in-chief, 1933–1942)
- Sir John Barbirolli (1943–1970)
- James Loughran (1971–1983)
- Stanisław Skrowaczewski (1982–1992)
- Kent Nagano (1992–1999)
- Sir Mark Elder (2000–2024)
- Kahchun Wong (2024–present)

=== Principal guest conductors ===
- Thomas Adès (2026–)

== Venues ==
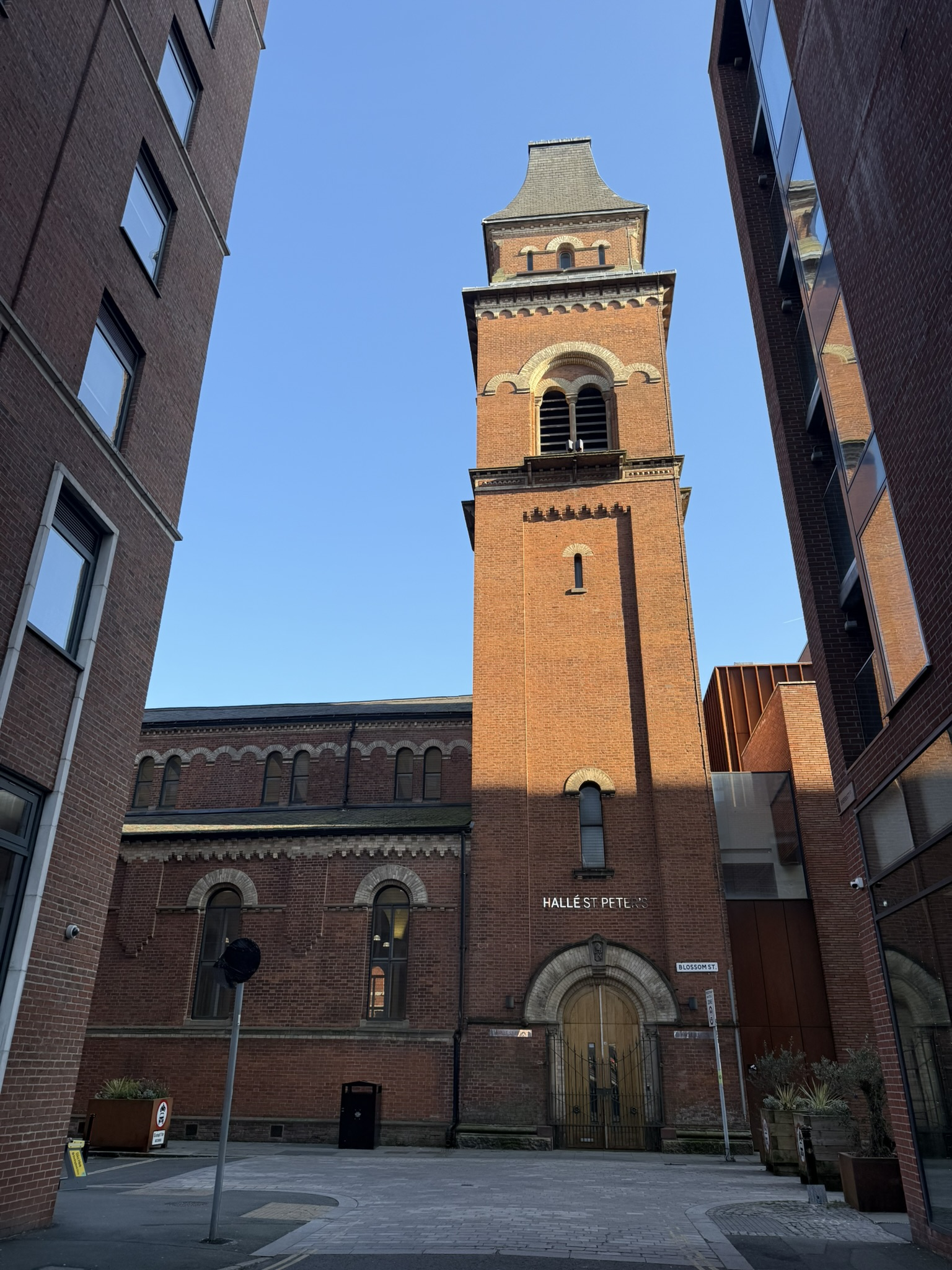
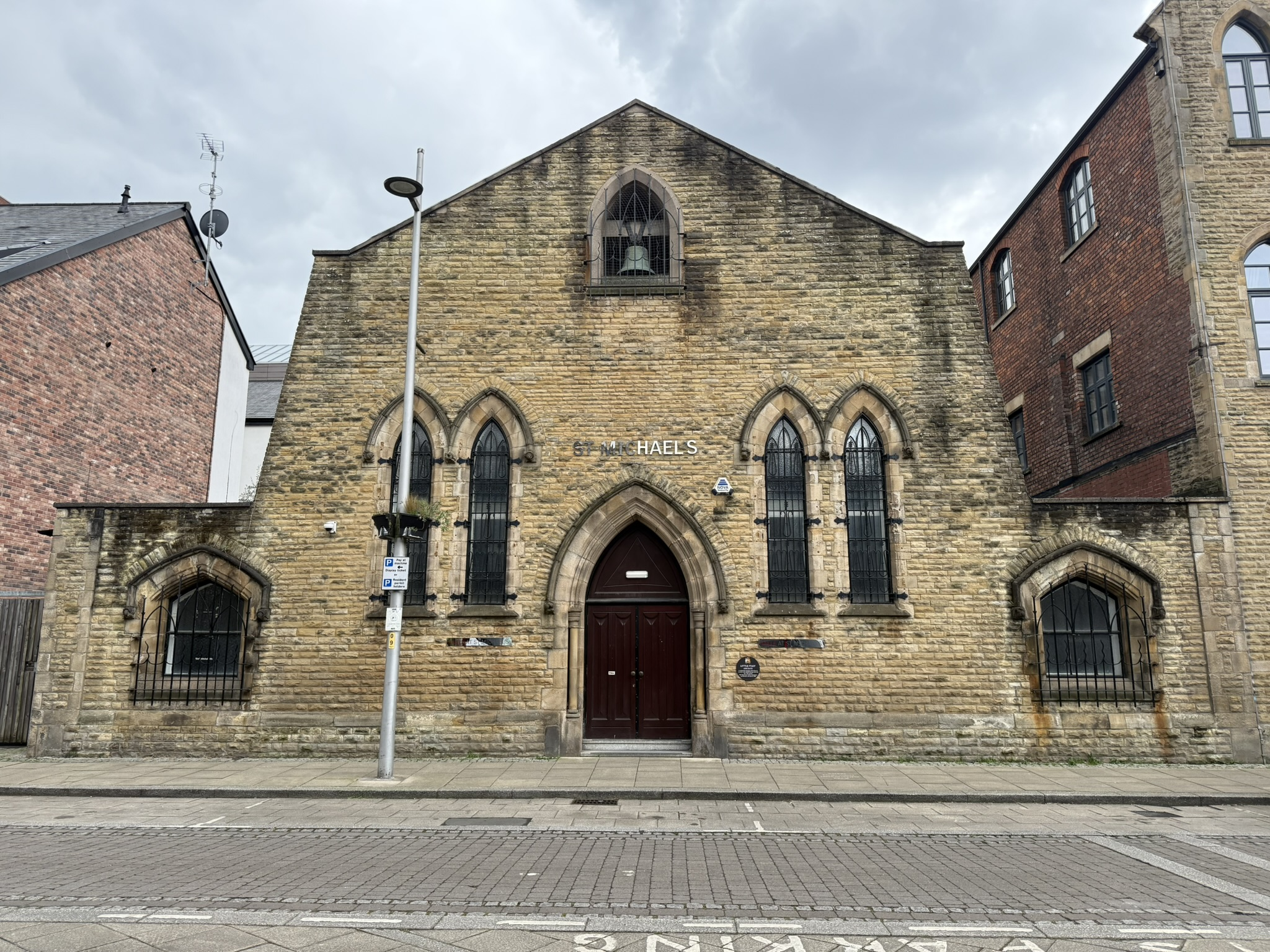
Hallé St Peter's (left) and Hallé St Michael's (right) both in the Ancoats area of Manchester, United Kingdom in April 2025

The Hallé performs about 70 concerts a year in Manchester's Bridgewater Hall, opened in 1996.

Hallé St Peter's is a grade II listed former church in Ancoats which was converted for the orchestra to use for rehearsals, recordings, and small performances, and as a base for the choirs and Youth Orchestra. It was opened in 2013 by Sophie, Countess of Wessex. Simon Armitage, the Poet Laureate, wrote a poem "the event horizon" to commemorate the opening of its extension, the Oglesby Centre in 2019, and the poem is included in the building "in the form of a letter-cut steel plate situated in the entrance to the auditorium, the 'event horizon'".

Hallé at St Michael's is another converted church, used as a space for artistic and educational activities and community events.

== Bibliography ==
- Kennedy, Michael (1982) The Hallé, 1858–1983: a History of the Orchestra. Manchester: Manchester University Press, ISBN 978-0-7190-0921-1
