= Henry Hiles =

English composer, organist, writer and music educator

Henry Hiles (31 December 1826 – 20 October 1904) was an English composer, organist, writer and music educator.

== Early life and education ==
Born in Shrewsbury, Hiles was the youngest of six sons and was first taught music by his eldest brother, John Hiles (1810-1882), known as an arranger of organ music and for authoring several catechisms. Henry Hiles began studying piano at the age of four and organ shortly afterwards. Much later in life he undertook formal musical studies at the University of Oxford, where he earned his Bachelor of Music degree in 1862 and his Mus.Doc. in 1867.

== Manchester ==
Hiles became the organist at Bury parish church in 1845, moving to Bishopwearmouth in 1847. After a period of travel to Australia and elsewhere he returned to London, where he was appointed organist of St Michael Wood Street in 1859, staying for only a few months. He then returned to Manchester, where he became organist of St. Thomas, Old Trafford, Manchester, and (in 1861) the parish church at Bowden. From 1863 until 1867 he was organist at St. Paul's, Hulme

From 1876 Hiles taught harmony and composition at Owens College, Manchester (subsequently Victoria University) where in 1891 he helped establish the faculty of music, and was appointed permanent senior examiner and lecturer. He was also professor of harmony and counterpoint at the Royal Manchester College of Music, where among his notable pupils was composer Leo Smith. In 1882 he was a founder of the Society of Professional Musicians. Hiles was much in demand as a choral conductor in Manchester, Preston and Warrington, and at the Manchester Athenaeum Musical Society. He was a frequent contributor of articles to The Quarterly Musical Review for which he was also editor and proprietor from 1885-1888.

== Composer ==
His compositions include oratorios and cantatas including David (1860), The Patriarchs (1872), Watchfulness (for female voices and orchestra), Fayre Pastoral and The Crusaders. Other works include the "serious glee" Hushed in Death, which was performed by the Manchester Gentlemen's Glee Club in 1878, church music (including 14 anthems), the operetta, War in the Household (1885), the concert overtures Youth and Harold (1893), and various works for organ, including six impromptus and a Fantasia in D minor. He won multiple prestigious composition awards, including the first prize for organ composition at the College of Organists in 1864 and the Meadowcroft Prize in 1882.

== Personal life and death ==
His first wife was Fanny Lockyer. He later married again, to Isabel Higham, and there were two sons and one daughter. He died in Worthing on 20 October 1904 at the age of 77.

== Sources ==
- J. C. Bridge, rev. Anne Pimlott Baker. "Hiles, Henry (1826–1904)". Oxford Dictionary of National Biography (online ed.). Oxford University Press. doi:10.1093/ref:odnb/33864. (Subscription, Wikipedia Library access or UK public library membership required.)
