= Charles Hallé =

Prussian and British musician (1819–1895)

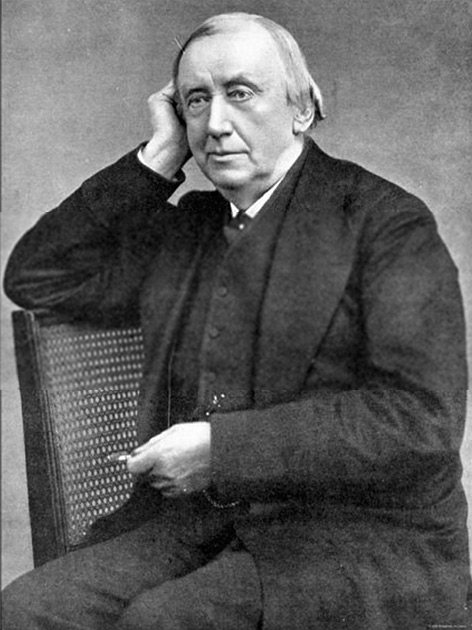
Charles Hallé

Sir Charles Hallé (born Karl or Carl Halle; 11 April 1819 – 25 October 1895) was a Prussian and later British pianist and conductor, best known for founding the Hallé Orchestra in Manchester.

Born to a musical family, Hallé studied in Paris and later taught and played there until musical life in the city was disrupted by the French Revolution of 1848. He then moved to England: first to London and subsequently to Manchester, where he founded his orchestra in 1858, remaining its conductor until his death in 1895.

== Life and career ==
=== Early years ===
Hallé was born on 11 April 1819 in Hagen, Westphalia, Prussia, the eldest child of Caroline née Brenschedt and her husband, Friedrich Halle. He was christened as "Karl" but also used the spelling "Carl". His father was organist of the principal church, Musikdirektor, responsible for conducting the concerts given in the town, and a teacher of singing and instrumental playing.

Halle's first lessons in music were from his father and he immediately showed an unusual talent for playing the piano. He gave a public performance of a sonata by his father and played percussion in the town orchestra in his early years. In August 1828 he took part in a concert at Cassel, where he attracted the notice of the composer Louis Spohr. He first conducted at the age of eleven deputising for his father who was taken ill during the town's annual visit from a touring opera company; he took over the direction of Der Freischütz Die Zauberflöte, Zampa, Fra Diavolo and other operas.

=== Paris ===
Hallé as a young man, by Victor Mottez

Halle studied under Christian Heinrich Rinck at Darmstadt in 1835, and in 1836 went to Paris, hoping to become a piano pupil of Friedrich Kalkbrenner, at whose suggestion he instead studied under George Alexander Osborne. His biographer Michael Kennedy writes, "With his good looks and personal charm, Halle was soon in demand as a pianist in the fashionable salons. There he met and mixed with the astonishing galaxy of artists living and working in the French capital, not only musicians such as the impoverished Richard Wagner and Chopin, Liszt, Thalberg, Paganini, and Cherubini, but the literary figures Alfred de Musset, Alphonse de Lamartine, and George Sand, and the painter Ingres".

He remained based in Paris, teaching and giving a series of chamber concerts with Jean-Delphin Alard and Auguste Franchomme with great success. He was the first player to perform all Beethoven's piano sonatas in Paris. He adopted the French form of his forename and added an acute accent to his surname so that his French – and, later, British – audiences would pronounce it as a bisyllable, as in German. He became a devotee of the music of Berlioz, and attended the rehearsals and first performances of several of his works, including the Requiem and Roméo et Juliette. In 1841 he married Désirée Smith de Rilieu, formerly of New Orleans, and by this time living in Paris with her widowed mother.

=== London ===
In 1843 Hallé made his first visit to England, remaining there for eight weeks. He won highly favourable notices: one critic called him "a pianist of the rarest order of merit [with] a command of his art which, we believe, could scarcely be surpassed"; another wrote, "Hallé is a pianist of prodigious power. His manual dexterity is immense."

Hallé was unimpressed by the English musical scene of the period, but when the French Revolution of 1848 broke out, musical life in Paris was disrupted and he moved to London with his wife and their two children. (Note: The couple later had seven more children.) He performed Beethoven's Emperor concerto at Covent Garden and gave a solo recital. He again won high praise from music critics; one wrote of his performance of the Beethoven:

We have never heard this beautiful work so gracefully or so conscientiously rendered. The various passages were read with a perfect appreciation of the author's intention, and performed with exquisite delicacy and irreproachable fidelity. Amidst the incursion of Continental pianists in England, we doubt if there be one that will be found to possess so true a mastery of the piano, or prove so faithful and refined an exponent of the great classical works.

But so many of Hallé's Parisian colleagues were also in London that competition for engagements and audiences was intense. A prosperous Mancunian patron of the arts, Hermann Leo, had heard Hallé play in Paris, and invited him to Manchester.

=== Manchester ===
In September 1848 Hallé played the Emperor concerto at the Gentlemen's Concerts, a long-established Manchester institution with its own concert hall. (Note: The Gentlemen's Concerts were a series of concerts in Manchester begun as gathering of amateur flautists in about 1770. Their concert hall was built in 1777. According to The Oxford Dictionary of Music the concerts offered enterprising programmes but standards declined in the 1840s. Although Hallé's direction improved the concerts they were subsequently overshadowed by the foundation of his own concerts and the Hallé Orchestra in 1858, but continued until 1920.) The orchestra was greatly inferior to those with whom he was used to playing, and he wrote in his memoirs, "I seriously thought of packing up and leaving Manchester, so that I might not have to endure a second of these wretched performances", but his friends convinced him that he could and should stay and reform the musical life of the town.

Programme for the first Hallé concert

Hallé's first step in that direction was to inaugurate a series of chamber concerts at the Royal Manchester Institution, beginning in December 1848. The following November he was appointed conductor of the Gentlemen's Concerts. He was given complete freedom to re-form the orchestra that had appalled him the previous year. He also founded a successful choral society and in 1854–55 tried, with less success, to establish opera in Manchester. In addition he gave piano recitals. The town was growing in size and importance and was granted city status in 1853; four years later a major international exhibition lasting six months was mounted there. Hallé was engaged to conduct daily concerts with an enlarged orchestra in the exhibition hall. Rather than disband the orchestra after the exhibition closed, he engaged the players for a new series of concerts at his own risk. The first, with an orchestra of sixty players, was given on 30 January 1858 at the Free Trade Hall, which became the orchestra's main base for more than a century. The Hallé, by some accounts, is Britain's oldest symphony orchestra, although the Royal Liverpool Philharmonic also claims the title. The oldest symphony orchestra in London, the LSO, was not founded until nearly half a century after the Hallé.

Kennedy comments that three outstanding features marked Hallé's work with the orchestra: his insistence that a large number of cheap seats would be available, his gradual but steady education of the public, and his enthusiasm for performing new music. He introduced works by contemporary composers including Brahms, Dvořák, Massenet, Saint-Saëns,Tchaikovsky, Verdi and Wagner. He conducted all nine of Beethoven's symphonies, all five published symphonies by Dvořák, twenty-six by Haydn, eight by Mozart and four by Mendelssohn. He presented works by British composers including Sullivan, Stanford and Parry. He remained devoted to the music of Berlioz, giving the first British performances of the Symphonie fantastique, La damnation de Faust and L'enfance du Christ. Kennedy comments that he attracted the leading soloists of the day to Manchester and, having extensive continental contacts, was able to recruit excellent players for his orchestra. Hallé's biographer Charles Rigby wrote in 1951:

When building up his original orchestra Hallé chose as guide the best continental models, the Paris Conservatoire, and one or two German orchestras. He had learned much from Berlioz (as Berlioz had in one way or another learned much from him). In engaging key players for Manchester he cast his net as wide as possible.

The Hallé Orchestra's concert season, which eventually ran to twenty concerts a year, was in the winter; at other times of the year Hallé conducted and played in Bristol, Edinburgh, Liverpool and London. He was a celebrated teacher: his pupils included the Princess of Wales (later Queen Alexandra) and his best-known professional student, Louis Moreau Gottschalk. In 1893 he saw the fulfilment of one of his ambitions for Manchester: the foundation of a music college there. He was appointed principal and piano professor at the Royal Manchester College of Music, which opened in October of that year.

In 1888 Hallé, whose first wife had died in 1866, married the violinist Wilma Norman-Neruda. The same year, he was knighted at Windsor Castle. In 1890 and 1891 he toured with his wife in Australia; they toured South Africa in 1895. Shortly after their return he was taken ill and died at their house in Hulme, Manchester on 25 October 1895 of a cerebral haemorrhage. He was buried in Weaste Cemetery, Salford after a service at the Church of the Holy Name at which the Bishop of Salford preached the sermon and Hallé's orchestra and choir performed Mozart's Requiem.

== Notes, references and sources ==
=== Sources ===
- Axon, William (1886). The Annals of Manchester. Manchester: John Heywood. OCLC 4444962.
- Hallé, Charles (1896). Life and Letters of Sir Charles Hallé. London: Smith, Elder and Co. OCLC 1048311661.
- Morrison, Richard (2004). Orchestra: The LSO: A Century of Triumph and Turbulence. London: Faber and Faber. ISBN 978-0-57-121584-3.
- Rigby, Charles (1952). Sir Charles Hallé: A Portrait for Today. Manchester: Dolphin Press. OCLC 512184.
