= Royal Manchester College of Music =

Music school in Manchester, England

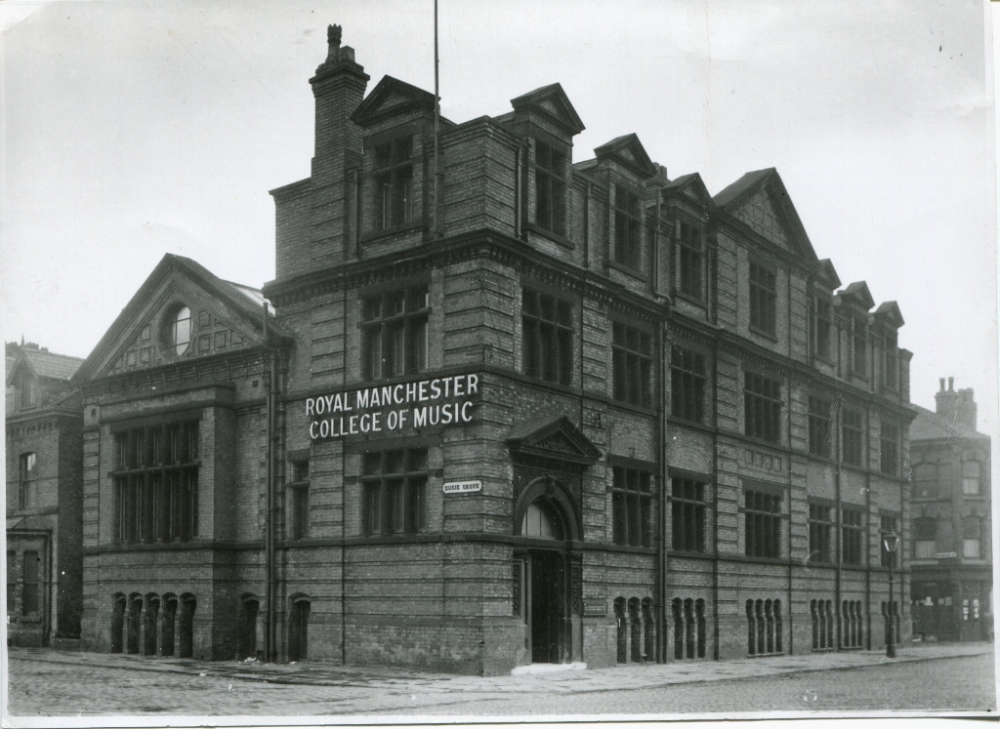
- The former college building on Ducie Grove, Manchester
- Type: Public, Conservatoire
- Active: 1893–1972
- Founder: Sir Charles Hallé
- Principal: Sir Charles Hallé
- Location: Ducie Grove, Manchester, Manchester, England; 53.463206°N 2.231284°W
- Campus: Urban

The Royal Manchester College of Music (RMCM) was a tertiary level conservatoire in Manchester, north-west England. It was founded in 1893 by the German-born conductor Sir Charles Hallé in 1893.

In 1972, the Royal Manchester College of Music amalgamated with the Northern School of Music to form the Royal Northern College of Music.

== History ==
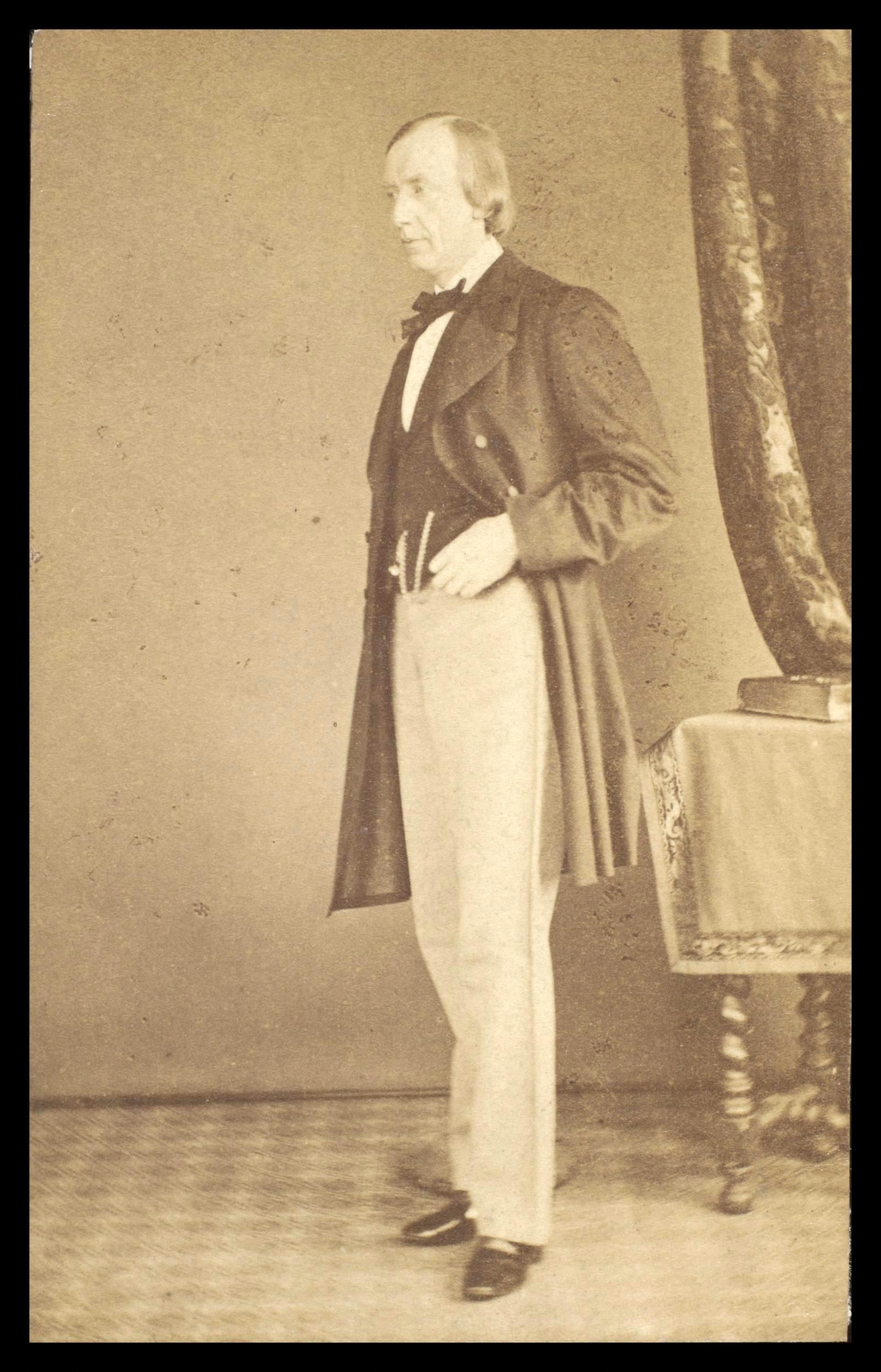
Founder Sir Charles Hallé (c.1860)

The Royal Manchester College of Music was founded in 1893 by Sir Charles Hallé who assumed the role as Principal. For a long period of time Hallé had argued for Manchester's need for a conservatoire to properly train the local talent.

The RMCM opened in 1893 in a former club building on the corner of Ducie Grove and Ducie Street, near Oxford Road. The building was adapted for use as a college by the architects Salomons and Steinthal, and contained a 400-seat concert hall lined with walnut wood panelling, classrooms, a library and offices. According to the Manchester Guardian, instead of a formal opening ceremony, donors were invited to a conversazione with Sir Charles Hallé and other musicians on Saturday October 7, 1893. Students were admitted in October 1893.

In 1888 German violinist Willy Hess became leader of The Hallé Orchestra, a role he held until 1895. From its opening in 1893 he was also the principal professor of violin at the Royal Manchester College of Music.

In 1954 the Principal of the RMCM, Frederic Cox, started to explore the issue of amalgamation with the Northern School of Music. This took until 1972 when the amalgamation resulted in the founding of the Royal Northern College of Music.

== Principals ==
- Sir Charles Hallé (1891–95)
- Adolph Brodsky (1896–1929)
- Robert Jaffrey Forbes (1929–1953)
- Frederic Cox (1953–1970)

== Notable teachers ==
- John Acton, voice
- Wilhelm Backhaus, piano
- Rawdon Briggs, violin
- Walter Carroll, composition
- Arthur Catterall (violin)
- Paul Cropper (viola)
- Marie Fillunger, voice
- Carl Fuchs
- Geoffrey Gilbert (flute)
- Willy Hess (violin)
- Henry Hiles
- Helen Lemmens-Sherrington, voice
- Frank Merrick, piano
- Olga Neruda, piano
- Egon Petri (piano)
- Thomas Pitfield (composition)
- James Kendrick Pyne, organ
- Evelyn Rothwell (viola)
- Simon Speelman, violin
- Hope Squire, piano

== Notable alumni ==
- Harrison Birtwistle (1934–2022), composer
- Arthur Butterworth (1923–2014), composer
- Pamela Bowden (1925–2003), contralto and voice teacher
- Louis Cohen (1894–1956), violinist and conductor
- Peter Maxwell Davies (1934–2016), composer
- Rodney Friend (born 1939), violinist
- Alexander Goehr (1932–2024), composer
- Barry Griffiths (1939–2020), violinist
- Elizabeth Harwood (1938–1990), opera singer
- Jeffrey Lawton (1938–2018), tenor
- John McCabe (1939–2015), pianist and composer
- Martin Milner (1928–2000), violinist
- John Ogdon (1937–1989), piano
- Alan Rawsthorne (1905–1971), composer
- Maisie Ringham (1924–2016), trombonist
- Barbara Robotham (1936–2013), opera singer and voice teacher
- Carol Jane Seymour, accompanist.
- Carolyn Watkinson (born 1949), opera singer
- John Ramsden Williamson (1929–2015), composer
- Olive Zorian (1916–1965), violinist

== Other sources ==
- Royal Manchester College of Music Archive: National Archives
