= List of compositions by Peter Maxwell Davies =

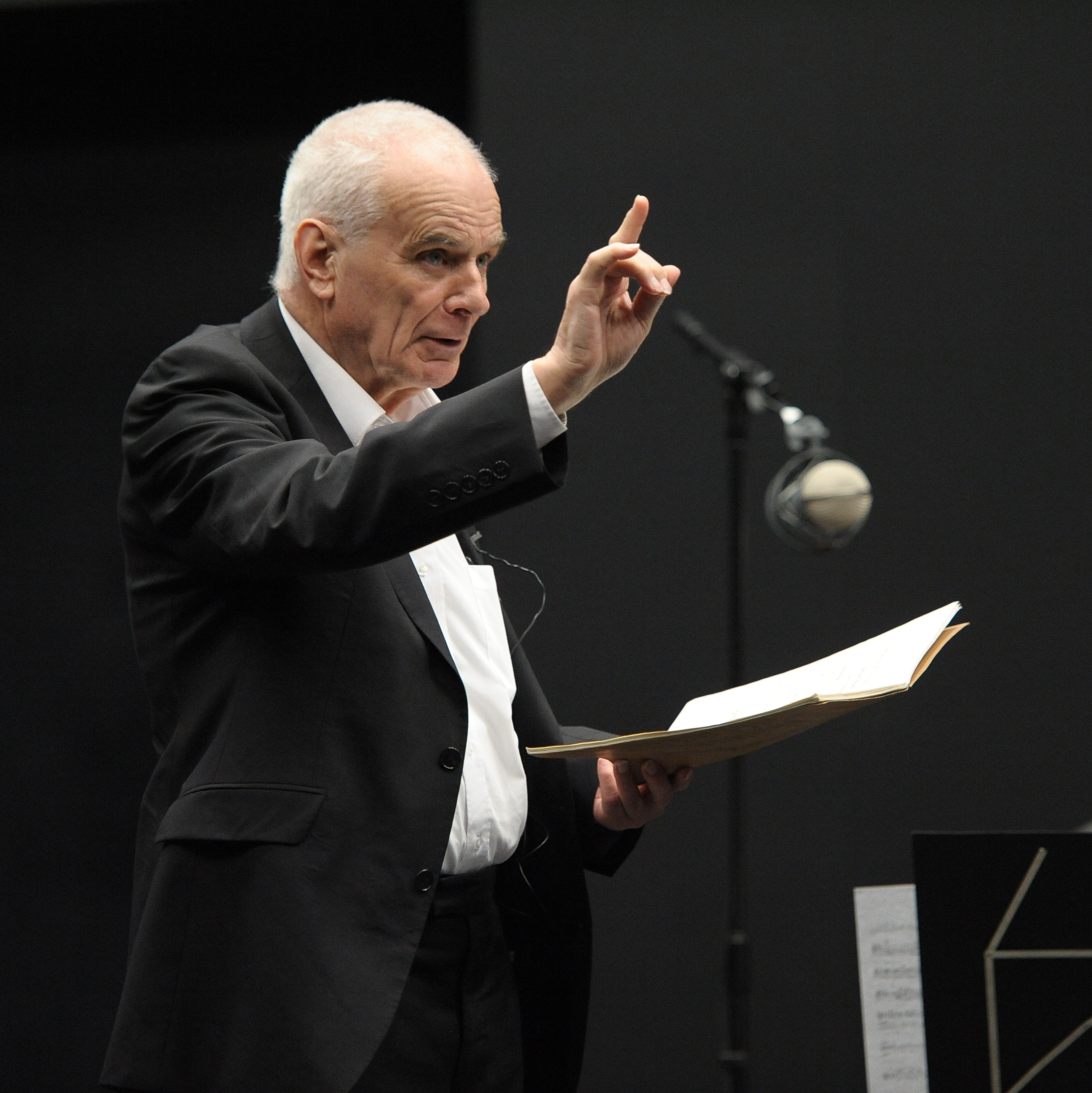
Peter Maxwell Davies in 2012

Peter Maxwell Davies, an English composer and conductor, wrote music in many genres, notably ten symphonies and works for the stage, from the monodrama Eight Songs for a Mad King (first performed in 1969) to The Hogboon (scheduled to be performed in June 2016).

His official catalogue includes more than 334 works starting with his Op. 1 in 1955, but there are also about fifty earlier works dating back as far as 1942—regarded as juvenilia—and around a hundred minor mature works, designated by "WoO" (Werke ohne Opuszahl = Works without Opus number). These numbers were not assigned by the composer, but rather were first established only in 2010.

He sometimes based his music on Mediaeval and Renaissance motifs and themes such as the opera Taverner, on the composer John Taverner. After his move to Orkney, he often used Orcadian themes, for example in An Orkney Wedding, with Sunrise for orchestra with bagpipes. Interested in classical forms, he composed series and cycles of works. The first seven of his ten symphonies form a cycle. He composed several concertos, including a Trumpet Concerto and a series of ten Strathclyde Concertos for different instruments, sometimes in combination. Of his fourteen string quartets, ten form a series, the Naxos Quartets which can be considered a multi-installment "novel."

== Table of selected compositions ==
This incomplete table of compositions by Peter Maxwell Davies lists notable works chronologically, adding when available subtitle or full title, scoring, Opus number (Op.), year of composition, genre, text information, and the link to the details on the official website. The title is sometimes a common title, with a subtitle added in the same column, while other details such as a full title or a description appear in the second column. The scoring is given if it is not obvious from the title, or unexpected, such as the tenth symphony which includes vocal parts. A year of composition follows, according to the website. The year of a first performance may be different. The column "Text" lists texts on which the work is based, or their author(s).

Compositions by Peter Maxwell Davies
Op.	Title	Detail	Scoring	Year	Genre	Text	Reference
WoO 1	Early Morning Echoes		piano solo	1942	Solo instrumental		343
1	Sonata		trumpet and piano	1955	Chamber		225
2	Five Pieces for Piano		piano solo	1956	Solo instrumental		89
5	Alma Redemptoris Mater		wind sextet: flute, oboe, 2 clarinets, bassoon, horn	1957	Chamber		29
19	First Taverner Fantasia	First Fantasia on an In Nomine of John Taverner		1962	Orchestral		82
23	Second Taverner Fantasia	Second Fantasia on an In Nomine of John Taverner		1964	Orchestral		208
27	Five Little Pieces for Piano		piano solo	1964	Solo instrumental		87
31	Revelation and Fall	Monodrama	soprano; instrumental ensemble	1966	Vocal		200
37	St Thomas Wake: Foxtrot for Orchestra on a Pavan by John Bull			1966–1969	Orchestral		
38	Worldes Blis			1966–1969	Orchestral		
39	Eight Songs for a Mad King Music theatre work for male voice and instrumental ensemble			1969	Opera	Randolph Stow, George III	2
46	Points and Dances from "Taverner" for instrumental ensemble			1971	Suite		
71	Symphony No. 1			1976	Symphony		258
72	The Martyrdom of St Magnus Chamber opera in nine scenes			1976	Opera	Peter Maxwell Davies	289
80a	Salome Ballet in two acts			1978	Ballet	Peter Maxwell Davies	204
86	The Lighthouse Chamber opera in one act with prologue			1979	Opera	Peter Maxwell Davies	286
87	Cinderella Pantomime opera in two acts for young performers			1979	Opera	Peter Maxwell Davies	59
88	The Yellow Cake Revue			1980	Solo instrumental		300
91	Symphony No. 2			1980	Symphony		259
93	Piano Sonata		piano solo	1981	Solo instrumental		188
103	Sea Eagle		horn solo	1982	Solo instrumental		205
107	Organ Sonata		organ solo	1982	Solo instrumental		181
119	Symphony No. 3			1984	Symphony		260
120a	An Orkney Wedding, with Sunrise For orchestra with solo bagpipes			1984	Orchestral		31
123	Violin Concerto No. 1	dedicated to Isaac Stern		1985	Concerto		61
128	Strathclyde Concerto No. 1		oboe; orchestra	1987	Concerto		242
131	Strathclyde Concerto No. 2		cello; orchestra	1987	Concerto		243
132	Trumpet Concerto			1988	Concerto		341
136	Symphony No. 4			1989	Symphony		261
139	Strathclyde Concerto No. 3		horn; trumpet; orchestra	1989	Concerto		541
143	Strathclyde Concerto No. 4		clarinet; orchestra	1990	Concerto		245
144a	Caroline Mathilde Ballet in two acts			1990	Ballet		54
151	Strathclyde Concerto No. 5		violin; viola; strings	1990	Concerto		246
152	Strathclyde Concerto No. 6		flute; orchestra	1991	Concerto		247
156	Strathclyde Concerto No. 7		double bass; orchestra	1992	Concerto		248
159	Strathclyde Concerto No. 8		bassoon; orchestra	1993	Concerto		249
166	Symphony No. 5			1994	Symphony		262
170	Strathclyde Concerto No. 9		piccolo; alto flute; cor anglais; E♭ clarinet; bass clarinet; contrabassoon; strings	1994	Concerto		250
176	Symphony No. 6			1996	Symphony		263
179	Strathclyde Concerto No. 10		orchestra	1996	Concerto		251
182	Piccolo Concerto			1996	Concerto		189
175	The Doctor of Myddfai Music theatre work for soprano, baritone, bass and instrumental ensemble			1995	Opera	David Pountney	276
207	Mr Emmet Takes a Walk Music theatre work for soprano, baritone, bass and instrumental ensemble			1999	Chamber opera	David Pountney	143
211	Symphony No. 7			2000	Symphony		264
215	Symphony No. 8 Antarctic			2000	Symphony		339
229	Naxos Quartet No. 1		string quartet	2002	Chamber		164
234	Naxos Quartet No. 2		string quartet	2003	Chamber		165
236	Naxos Quartet No. 3		string quartet	2003	Chamber		166
245	Naxos Quartet No. 4 Children's Games		string quartet	2004	Chamber		167
253	Naxos Quartet No. 5 Lighthouses of Orkney and Shetland		string quartet	2004	Chamber		168
257	Naxos Quartet No. 6		string quartet	2005	Chamber		169
265	Naxos Quartet No. 7 Metafore sul Borromini		string quartet	2005	Chamber		170
268	Naxos Quartet No. 8		string quartet	2003	Chamber		171
275	Naxos Quartet No. 9		string quartet	2005	Chamber		172
283	Naxos Quartet No. 10		string quartet	2007	Chamber		327
288	Piano Quartet		piano, violin, viola, cello	2007	Chamber		321
306	Kommilitonen!	Young Blood!		2011	Opera	David Pountney	549
315	Symphony No. 9			2012	Symphony		560
327	Symphony No. 10 "Alla ricerca di Borromini"		baritone; choir; orchestra	2013	Symphony	anonymous, Francesco Borromini, Giacomo Leopardi	572
336	The Hogboon		soloists; children's choirs; adult SATB choir; orchestra	2015	Dramatic work		582
