= Piano Concerto (Davies) =

The Piano Concerto is a composition for solo piano and orchestra by the British composer Peter Maxwell Davies. The piano concerto was commissioned by the Royal Philharmonic Orchestra and was completed on 24 September 1997. The piece is dedicated to the pianist Kathryn Stott, who premiered the work with the Royal Philharmonic Orchestra under the composer at the Nottingham Royal Concert Hall on 7 November 1997.

== Composition ==
The piano concerto has a duration of roughly 35 minutes and is composed in three movements:

1. Moderato – Più mosso – Andante – Più mosso – Andante – Più mosso – Andante
2. Adagio
3. Allegro

The work is scored for solo piano and an orchestra comprising piccolo, two flutes, two oboes, cor anglais, two clarinets, bass clarinet, two bassoons, contrabassoon, four horns, three trumpets, three trombones, timpani, three percussionists, and strings.

== Recording ==
A recording of the work, performed Kathryn Stott and Royal Philharmonic Orchestra under Davies, was released on CD through Naxos Records in January 2013. The disk also features Davies's 1969 motet for orchestra Worldes Blis.

== See also ==
- List of compositions by Peter Maxwell Davies
