= Martin Outram =

English viola soloist and violist

Martin Outram is an English viola soloist and violist of the Maggini Quartet.

== Biography ==
Martin Outram studied at Fitzwilliam College, Cambridge, and later at the Royal Academy of Music in London. Outram is the violist of the Maggini Quartet.

He has appeared as soloist with the London Mozart Players, Britten Sinfonia, Ambache Chamber Orchestra and New London Orchestra. He is an advocate of British contemporary music, giving first performances of pieces by Sir Peter Maxwell Davies, York Bowen (first European performance of his Viola Concerto), Adam Gorb, David Gow and Britten (first concert performance of Britten's "Portrait No.2"). He has performed in major concert halls in the UK and in Argentina, Brazil and Uruguay. Mr Outram has recorded for Naxos and plays on a Henricus Catenar viola made in Turin in 1680.

Martin Outram is a professor of viola at the Royal Academy of Music and an Honorary Fellow of Canterbury Christ Church University and Brunel University.
