= Ragnar Ulfung =

Norwegian operatic tenor

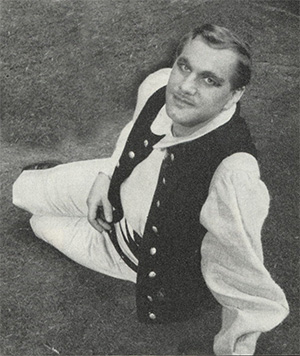
Ragnar Ulfung as Jeník in The Bartered Bride, 1957.

Ragnar Sigurd Ulfung (born 28 February 1927) is a Norwegian operatic tenor. Described in the Grove Dictionary of Music and Musicians as "a brilliant actor with an incisive voice", he was particularly known for his portrayals of Herod (Salome) and Mime (Der Ring des Nibelungen). He is also an opera director. Amongst the productions he has directed was a complete Ring cycle for the Seattle Opera.

Ulfung was born in Oslo and sang as an alto in a Norwegian boys' choir, and received his early training in singing and acting at the Oslo Conservatory. During his early 20s he continued vocal training for four years in Italy, studying in Milan before making his debut in Let's Make an Opera (Oslo, 1950). He worked for four months in 1952 with an illusionist in order to perform the role of the magician in Menotti's The Consul, in Oslo.

He made some early stage appearances in Oslo and Bergen (where he sang Faust 35 times in succession), but his career proper began in 1955 at Goteborg's Stora Teater where he remained for three years, singing roles from the Italian and French repertory, along with operetta.

He made a successful debut at the Royal Swedish Opera in 1958 as Canio in Pagliacci, joined the company that autumn, and remained a member of it until 1984. It was an important moment in the revival of the Royal Opera's fortunes due mainly to the work of Göran Gentele, but where Ulfung was an important participant. He sang Gustaf III more than 100 times with the company, being his debut role at Covent Garden, when the company visited London in 1960. Other regular parts in Stockholm covered many styles: including the Duke of Mantua, Don José, Hoffmann, Turiddu, Alfredo, and Lensky (Eugene Onegin). In 1963 he made his debut with the Covent Garden Opera itself as Don Carlos.

He also made other guest appearances abroad. His debut at the Metropolitan Opera was on 12 December 1972 as Mime in Siegfried and he went on to sing 93 performances there between 1972 and 1993. In 1975 he appeared in Ingmar Bergman's celebrated film of Mozart's The Magic Flute in the role of Monostatos, and he also sang Tom Rakewell in Bergman's production of The Rake's Progress in Stockholm. He was appointed Hovsångare in 1976; and was appointed St Olav Ridder av I klasse in 1976 and 1983. In 1975 he appeared at Drottningholm in Le Carnaval by Lully as Monsieur Pourceaugnac.

Contemporary opera featured in his career with the 'Deaf-Mute' part in the premiere of Blomdahl's space opera Aniara in 1959 in Stockholm; in 1969 "he thrilled audiences with his portrayal of Christopher, the dreamer and traveller to hell" in the premiere of Werle's Die Reise at Hamburg State Opera, and he took the title-role in Maxwell Davies's Taverner in 1972.

His two roles at Glyndebourne Opera were nearly 40 years apart: Tamino in Die Zauberflöte in the 1963 and 64 seasons, then Dr Blind in Die Fledermaus in 2003 which was later issued on DVD. At the Royal Opera House Covent Garden he sang the title role in Don Carlos in 1963, Herod in Salome in 1970 and 1974, and roles in the Ring cycle. Ulfung was scheduled to sing Vere in Billy Budd at Covent Garden in 1964 but objections by Equity and the threat of a strike led to him being replaced by Richard Lewis for the run. He sang John Taverner in the world premiere run of Peter Maxwell Davies' opera Taverner at Covent Garden in 1972.

In 2015, Ulfung at age 88 sang Altoum in Turandot at Dalhalla with Nina Stemme and Lars Cleveman among the cast.

Often described as a 'versatile artist', or an 'acting singer' Ulfung stated that he "emphatically prefers that description to the more common 'singing actor'. He believed in researching characters such as Herod "If you have a historical person like this you can read Oscar Wilde's play to get an idea of his fear and hate, his weakness and strength simultaneously", or that he might "approach a part like the Duke of Mantua, and of course Don Carlos by reading about the historical originals; you can learn a lot about the character that way".

In the early 1970s the Swedish Who's Who gave sport among Ulfung's hobbies, mostly through tennis, particularly in San Francisco where he appeared regularly at the opera house from 1967. He argued that a good physical condition is "essential for the Siegfried Mime, in which the singer must spend one-and-a-half hours crouching and bending his knee", and related a story from Hamburg State Opera's visit to New York in 1967. Singing Števa in Jenůfa, his performance brought out a newspaper headline 'Can you imagine Caruso doing cartwheels on stage? Mr Ulfung did them at the Met last night'. Appearing as Fadinard in the Swedish premiere of Nino Rota's Il cappello di paglia di Firenze (The Italian Straw Hat) he and Kerstin Meyer performed a parody of bad Italian opera singers "bellowing the love duet from some fifth-rate verismo tear-jerker" at the end of which Ulfung somersaulted over the couch on which Meyer sat "pounding the floor with his fists as he clung steadfastly to the final note".

As producer, he directed two operas in Santa Fe: La Boheme and Lulu, the latter production inspired by a short novel by Pär Lagerkvist comparing the whole world to a circus. In 1984 he supervised the production of the Ring Cycle at Seattle Opera.

== Sources ==
- Blyth Alan, "Ulfung, Ragnar (Sigurd)", in Stanley Sadie (ed.), The New Grove Dictionary of Music and Musicians, Grove 2001, Volume 26, p. 60. ISBN 0-19-517067-9
- Metropolitan Opera, Performance record: Ulfung, Ragnar (Tenor), MetOpera Database (accessed 26 April 2010)
- Stiftelsen Kungliga Teaterns Solister (Foundation of Royal Theatre Soloists), Biography: Ragnar Ulfung (in Swedish, accessed 26 April 2010)
