= Points and Dances (Davies) =

Suite for ensemble by Peter Maxwell Davies

- from the opera Taverner
- Suite by Peter Maxwell Davies
- Score cover published by Boosey & Hawkes
- Opus: 46
- Year: 1970
- Period: Contemporary music
- Related: Taverner
- Performed: 20 February 1971: London
- Published: 1978
- Publisher: Boosey & Hawkes
- Duration: 18 minutes
- Movements: 2 parts – 16 movements
- Scoring: Ensemble

Points and Dances from the Opera "Taverner" or Points and Dances from "Taverner", Op. 46, is a suite for ensemble written by British composer Peter Maxwell Davies from his own opera Taverner. Subtitled "instrumental dances and keyboard pieces from the opera for instrumental ensemble", it was finished in 1970.

== Composition ==
Points and Dances is one of the two compositions based on Taverner, an opera composed by Davies about John Taverner, one of the main English composers and organists of the 16th century. The other composition derived from the opera was the Second Fantasia on John Taverner's "In Nomine". Points and Dances was completed in 1970, probably as Davies was re-composing the opera, which was partially lost in a fire in 1969. It was premiered a year before the opera, on February 20, 1971, at the Queen Elizabeth Hall, by the Fires of London with Davies himself as the conductor. It was then published by Boosey & Hawkes in 1972.

== Structure ==
The suite is divided into two parts and a total of eight dances. Each part has a different scoring and structure. A typical performance takes around 18 minutes. The structure of part one consists of three movements. Part two, however, is divided into thirteen movements, that is, five dances and eight musical interludes played by the different keyboards. The structure is as follows:

- Act I
1. Pavan. Very steady
2. Galliard. Moderato — Recitativo freely, quite slow, espressivo — Moderato — Recitativo — Meno mosso
3. March. Allegro moderato
- Act II
1. Intrada (Ensemble)
2. Preambulum (Keyboard) (Note: Latin: Preamble)
3. Pavan (Ensemble)
4. Miserere (Keyboard) (Note: Latin: Have mercy)
5. Galliard (Ensemble)
6. Te per Orbem Terrarum (Keyboard) (Note: Latin: Thee [...] throughout the world)
7. Dumpe (Ensemble)
8. Eterne Rex Altissime (Keyboard) (Note: Latin: Highest eternal king)
9. Eterne Rex Alias (Keyboard) (Note: Latin: Eternal king elsewhere)
10. Eterne Rerum Conditor (Keyboard) (Note: Latin: Eternal maker of all)
11. Coranto (Ensemble)
12. Mask in echo (Keyboard)
13. Reprise (Ensemble)

The scoring for Act I and Act II are different: for Act I, the piece calls for an alto flute, a clarinet, a guitar, a harpsichord, a viola, and a cello; for Act II, a piccolo, a clarinet, a double bassoon, a trumpet, an alto trombone, a positive organ, a regal, and a pair of small tuned drums.

Movements from Act I are meant to be played attacca. However, the music from the different movements in Act II emerges from the preceding movement each time and, as such, there is no proper movement separation. Both dances and keyboard interludes begin before the preceding movement has finished, often entering on beats other than the first in the bar. In the case of movement VI, the keyboard plays over most of the duration of the preceding movement.

The piece is also formally divided into dances, played by the ensemble as a whole, and points, which are the interludes between the dances in Act II, played by the keyboardist at either the organ, the harpsichord, or the regal. The dances are formally based on —and bear the names of— renaissance dances from the 15th and 16th century, namely, a pavan, a galliard, a march, a dumpe, and a coranto. The points, however, are based on Christian hymns and Latin choruses referencing Taverner's compositions (e. g., Aeterne rerum conditor or Te per Orbem Terrarum).

== Recordings ==
As of 2022, there is only one recording of Points and Dances. It was made on December 17, 1971, at St John the Evangelist Catholic Church in Islington, with the Fires of London conducted by the composer. At the time, the Fires consisted of cellist Jennifer Ward Clarke, clarinetist Alan Hacker, contrabassoonist Kenneth Cooper, flutist Judith Pearce, guitarist Timothy Walker, keyboardist Stephen Pruslin, organist and regalist Misha Donat, percussionist James Walker, trombonist Roger Brenner, trumpetist Elgar Howarth, and violist Duncan Druce. Originally released on LP in 1973 by Decca subsidiary Argo Records, it was reissued on compact disc by UCJ in 2003 and Decca on September 4, 2015.
