= Symphony No. 10 (Davies) =

- "Alla ricerca di Borromini"
- by Peter Maxwell Davies
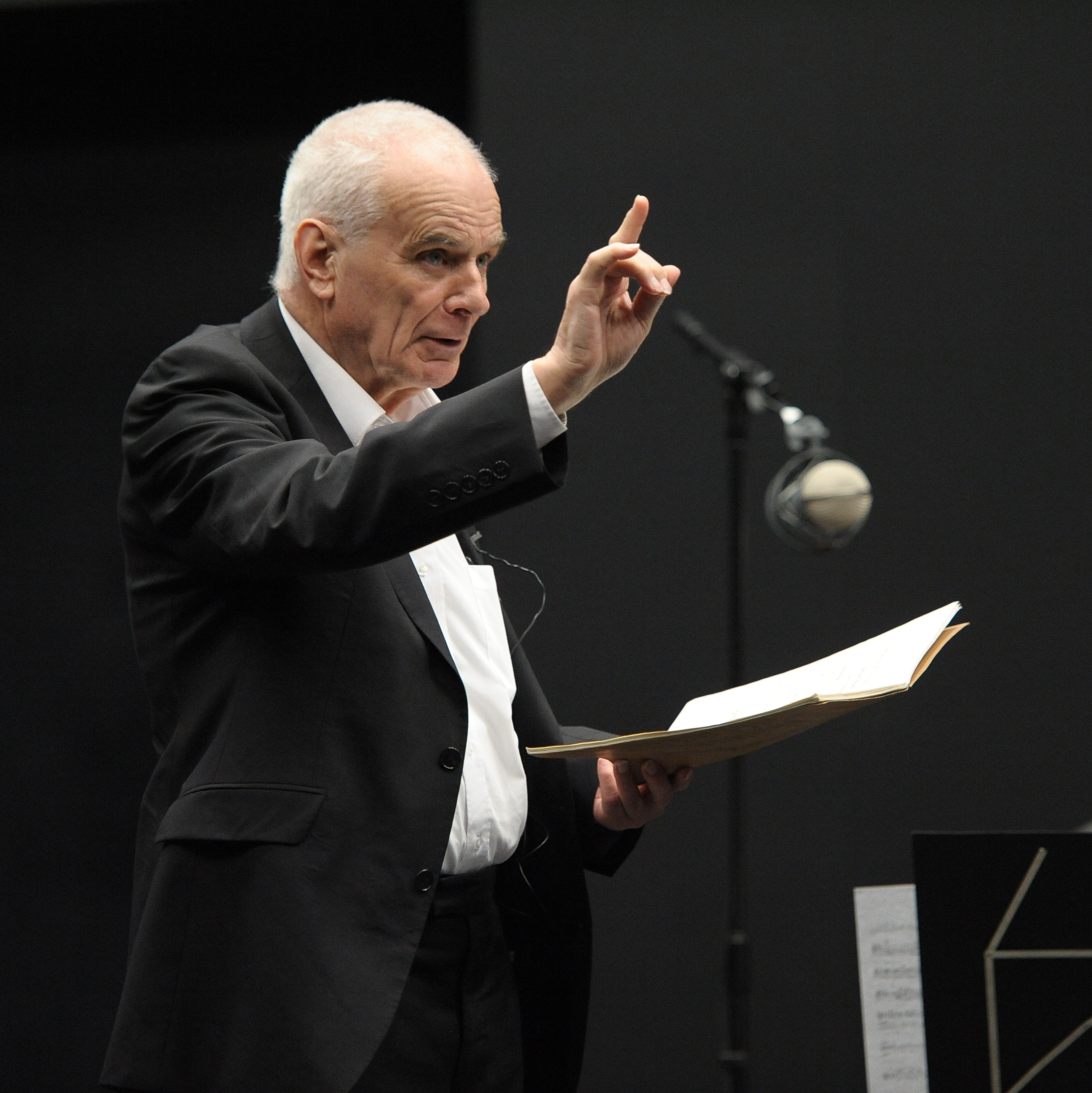
- The composer in 2012
- Opus: 327
- Composed: 2013
- Recorded: 2 February 2014
- Movements: 4
- Scoring: orchestra; chorus; baritone

Premiere
- Date: 2 February 2014
- Location: Barbican Hall, London
- Conductor: Antonio Pappano
- Performers: Markus Butter; London Symphony Orchestra and Chorus

The Symphony No. 10 ("Alla ricerca di Borromini"), Op. 327, is a composition for orchestra, chorus, and baritone soloist, composed by Peter Maxwell Davies in 2013. It was premiered on 2 February 2014 at the Barbican Hall in London, by the London Symphony Orchestra and Chorus, with baritone soloist Markus Butter, conducted by Antonio Pappano.

== History ==
The symphony was written on a joint commission from the London Symphony Orchestra, the Orchestra of the Accademia Nazionale di Santa Cecilia, and the Tchaikovsky Symphony Orchestra. Davies wrote much of the piece in University College Hospital, London whilst undergoing treatment for leukemia.

== Instrumentation ==
The symphony is scored for baritone solo and SATB chorus, and an orchestra consisting of piccolo, 3 flutes, alto flute, 3 oboes, 3 clarinets in A, bass clarinet, contrabass clarinet, 3 bassoons (third doubling 2nd contrabassoon), contrabassoon, 4 horns in F, 4 trumpets in C, 2 trombones, bass trombone, tuba, timpani (with medium temple bowl), percussion (6 players: glockenspiel, marimba, crotales, 3 suspended cymbals [small, medium, large] with bow, 3 nipple gongs [small, medium, large], tubular bells, 2 metal bars [medium, large], snare drum, tenor drum, very large bass drum, 2 tom-toms [small, medium], flexatone), and strings.

== Character and materials ==
The symphony concerns the life and death of a leading figure of Roman Baroque architecture in the 17th century, Francesco Borromini (who also inspired Davies's Naxos Quartet No. 7), and his rivalry with Gian Lorenzo Bernini. The symphony is in four parts: Part One: Adagio, Part Two: Allegro, Part Three: Presto, Part Four: Adagio. Part Two incorporates settings of an anonymous 17th century sonnet to Borromini and parts of the Opus Architectonicum by Borromini himself; Part Four contains settings of poetry by Giacomo Leopardi. It is an approachable, substantial work, written for a large orchestra especially characterised by the use of low woodwind and brass, and by a large percussion section (six players) featuring metallic instruments: bells, gongs, flexatone, crotales, temple bowl, amongst others.

== Discography ==
- Sir Peter Maxwell Davies: Symphony No. 10. Markus Butter, baritone; Simon Halsey, chorus master; London Symphony Chorus and Orchestra; Sir Antonio Pappano, cond. Recorded 2 February 2014, Barbican, London. LSO Live. Digital download. LSO Live LSO0267. London: London Symphony Orchestra, 2014.
- Sir Peter Maxwell Davies: Symphony No. 10; Sir Andrzej Panufnik: Symphony No. 10. Markus Butter, baritone; Simon Halsey, chorus master; London Symphony Chorus and Orchestra; Sir Antonio Pappano, cond. Recorded 2 February 2014 (Davies) and 19 October 2014 (Panufnik), Barbican, London. Hybrid Super Audio CD, 1 disc: digital, 12 cm, stereo/5.1 multi-channel. LSO Live LSO0767. London: London Symphony Orchestra, 2015.
