= Violin Concerto No. 1 (Davies) =

The Violin Concerto No. 1 is the first violin concerto by the British composer Peter Maxwell Davies. The violin concerto was commissioned by the Royal Philharmonic Orchestra to commemorate the ensemble's 40th anniversary. The work was completed in 1985 and first performed at the St Magnus Festival by the violinist Isaac Stern and the Royal Philharmonic Orchestra conducted by André Previn on 21 June 1986. The piece is dedicated to Isaac Stern.

== Composition ==
The concerto has a duration of approximately 31 minutes and is cast in three movements played without break:

1. Allegro moderato
2. Adagio
3. Allegro non troppo

Davies was influenced by Felix Mendelssohn's Violin Concerto in determining the form of his own concerto.

The work is scored for a solo violinist and an orchestra consisting of two flutes, two oboes, two clarinets, two bassoons, two horns, two trumpets, timpani, and strings.

== Reception ==
Reviewing a 1988 recording of the violin concerto, Arnold Whittall of Gramophone wrote, "It offers fewer opportunities for the big, bold gesture, yet it's not—as its cautious Orkney premiere suggested it might be—merely evidence of the mellowing of Max, even of his degeneration into an atonal Max Bruch. His innate toughness and intensity still register, although here and there—for example, in the first movement cadenza—I did wonder whether the nature of the solo instrument, and the conventions of so much earlier virtuoso writing for it, were not getting between the composer and his most personal mode of expression." He continued, "I also remain sceptical about whether 'tonality', as Davies understands it, contributes to the perceptibility and clarity of structure as significantly as the more basic formal divisions. Even so, on each hearing I've found this performance more satisfying and illuminating in its tracing of the way the music cunningly fades in and out of specifically Scottish allusions."

Reviewing the New York City premiere, Donal Henahan of The New York Times called it a "moderately dissonant and expertly orchestrated concerto [that] busied itself chopping up the musical line and working out rhythmic puzzles." He added, "The composer asserts that this score was influenced by Mendelssohn's Violin Concerto -both works are in three movements played without pause, for instance. However, Sir Peter does not make that comparison stick. His compulsion to change meters every bar or two lends his concerto an awkward restlessness that has little in common with the arching melodies of Mendelssohn. This 20th-century fascination with metrical changes is far more typical of Stravinsky, whose mastery of his craft, perhaps not incidentally, stopped well short of melodic genius."

== See also ==
- List of compositions by Peter Maxwell Davies
