= Hedwig Stein =

German-British concert pianist and teacher (1907-1983)

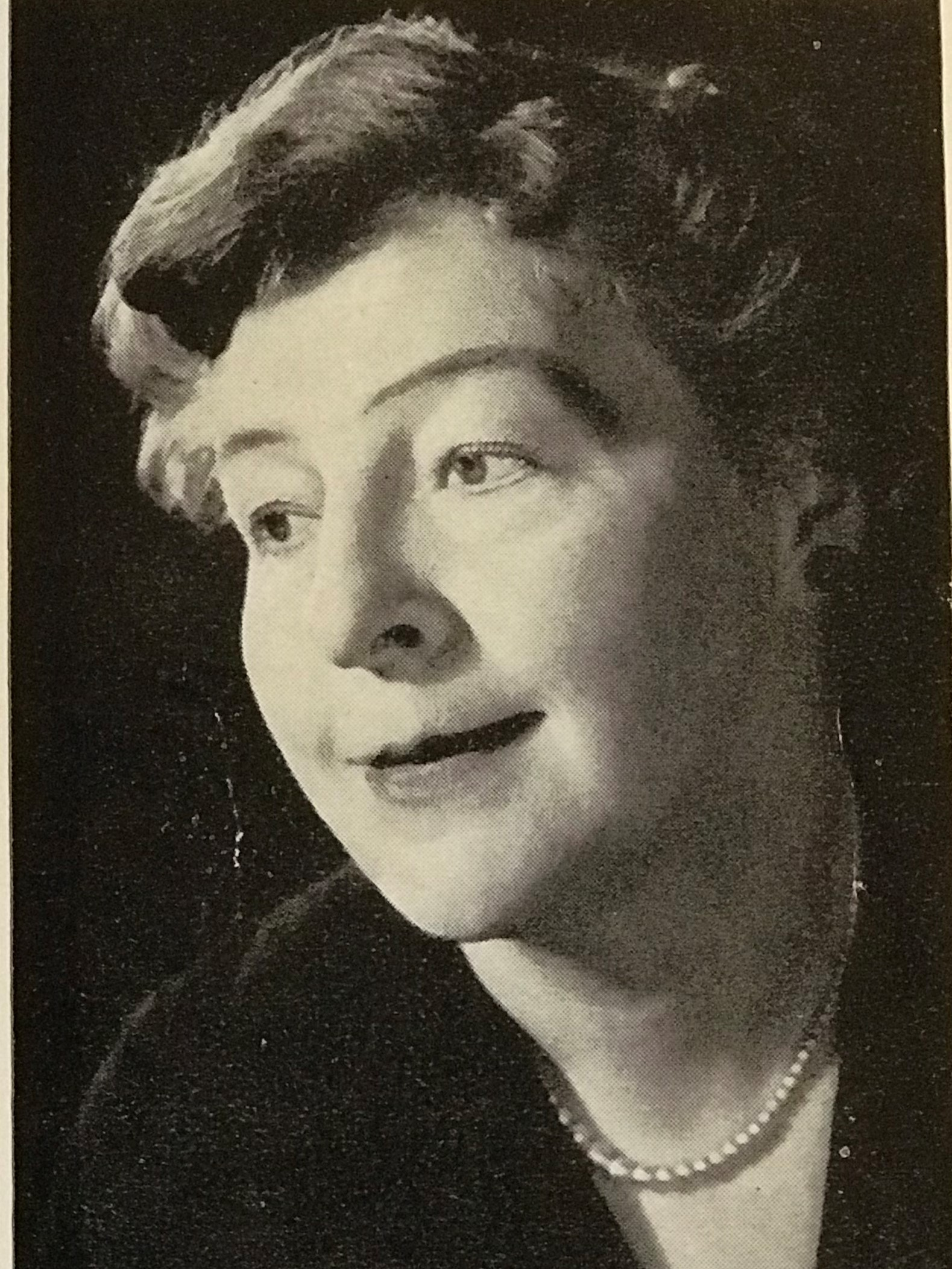
- Wigmore Hall, 1965
- Born: 21 October 1907
- Died: 11 June 1983 (aged 75)
- Occupation: Pianist
- Spouse: Iso Elinson (1905-1964 - his death)
- Children: Anna (b. 1933); Marga (1936 - 2005)

Hedwig Maximiliane Stein (1907-1983) was a German-British concert pianist and teacher at the Royal Northern College of Music. She was born in Jena, Thuringia, Germany on 21 October 1907 and died in Braintree, Essex, England on 11 June 1983 (aged 75).

== Biography ==
Hedwig Stein was the daughter of Fritz Stein, German conductor and musicologist, Generalmusikdirektor in Kiel and then Director of the Musikhochschule in Berlin from 1933 to 1945. Her main childhood teacher was her mother Margarethe Stein, daughter of the Heidelberg surgeon and oncologist Vincenz Czerny and granddaughter of the physician Adolf Kussmaul. Stein's godfather was the composer Max Reger. Hedwig Stein's first concerts as a teenager were in various cities in Germany, often under the baton of her father.

In the early 1930s, Hedwig Stein embarked on her main piano studies at the Stern Conservatoire with James Kwast and Frieda Kwast-Hodapp in Berlin where her debut in March 1933 was attended by Edwin Fischer and Wilhelm Kempff. Stein was also introduced to the Russian Jewish émigré pianist Iso Elinson. After a rushed wedding, the couple fled from Germany in August 1933, their destination London.

During World War II, Stein gave around 700 lecture recitals together with Elinson, primarily in Sussex, before moving in 1946 to Manchester where they each held teaching posts at the Royal Manchester College of Music (now incorporated in the Royal Northern College of Music). Described by Michael Kennedy as ‘a brilliant pianist’, Stein's Wigmore Hall debut was on 5 January 1956. She performed in concert venues across the UK, in recitals, in a duo with Martin Milner, and occasionally as a soloist, as well as for the Council for the Encouragement of Music and the Arts and various charitable organisations. She also gave many BBC broadcasts. No recordings survive. Stein's pupils at the RNCM included the composer and conductor Peter Maxwell Davies and the musicologist Professor Nigel Simeone.
