= Worldes Blis =

Motet for orchestra by Peter Maxwell Davies

Worldes Blis is a motet for orchestra by the British composer Peter Maxwell Davies. It was first performed at The Proms on 28 August 1969 by the BBC Symphony Orchestra conducted by the composer.

== Composition ==
Davies composed Worldes Blis between 1966 and 1969. It has a duration of roughly 40 minutes and is composed in one continuous movement. The composition is based on an eponymous 13th-century plainsong, "Worldes Blis."

=== Instrumentation ===
The work is scored for an orchestra comprising two flutes, piccolo, two oboes, two clarinets, bass clarinet, two bassoons, contrabassoon, four horns, three trumpets, three trombones, tuba, two timpanists, five percussionists, two harps, chamber organ, and strings.

== Reception ==
=== World premiere ===
Worldes Blis generated considerable notoriety upon its 1969 premiere when the performance caused most of the audience to leave the concert hall. The music critic Tom Service described the event to be "as near as the Royal Albert Hall has ever come to a riot". Davies himself later recalled, "Most of the audience walked out, and most of those who stayed booed." Nevertheless, in 2015 the music critic Andrew Clements of The Guardian declared it one of the ten best Proms premieres.

=== Later performances ===
The work has since received a more favorable response from audiences and critics alike. Reviewing a 1992 performance by Leonard Slatkin and the St. Louis Symphony, Bernard Holland of The New York Times wrote:

It is 40 minutes long and follows its own path in its own time. For its first quarter-hour, quietness reigns: lapping and overlapping string lines underneath, transformations of 13th-century monody expressed through horn and high trumpet solos. Worldes Blis, depending on your point of view, is courageous in the face of short attention spans, or else it is indifferent to the casual listener's expectations. The tension and release of an older harmony exist as cells, but larger phrases sail above tonality. The rejection is not an angry one; indeed, Worldes Blis is very interested in making the symphony orchestra sound beautiful. As its unbroken line rises like an incoming tide, Mr. Maxwell Davies introduces series of drones: first a calm, prolonged sound, then a querulous squealing and finally ringing bells and percussion. Worldes Blis stands to itself, respectfully asking attention but declining to advertise for it.

Holland further observed, "Braced by Mr. Slatkin's introductory remarks, Friday's audience bore Worldes Blis diligently, sensing that a reward was in the offing."

Reviewing a 1993 performance by Davies and the Royal Philharmonic Orchestra, Michael White of The Independent called it "an orchestral juggernaut whose slow, massive progression from transparent austerity to sonic barrage made such tough demands on its initial 1960s audience that it acquired a reputation as a concert-killer." He added, "Wednesday's was a rare hearing and still tough, but perhaps with more appeal for 1990s ears attuned to slow massivity through Tavener, Gorecki and the holy minimalists. This reading by the RPO certainly revealed more radiant qualities than I remembered, and Davies clearly thinks the time is right to relaunch it." Ivan Hewett of BBC Music Magazine similarly remarked, "Worldes Blis is a very private piece which spins itself broodingly out of the opening plainsong melody, announced by a solo trombone. Over the next 40 minutes it gradually accumulates a darkly intense energy and momentum that's discharged in the final climax."

== Recording ==
A recording of the work performed by the Royal Philharmonic Orchestra under Davies was released on CD through Naxos Records in January 2013. The disk also features Davies's Piano Concerto.

== See also ==
- List of compositions by Peter Maxwell Davies
