= Maggini Quartet =

- Origin: United Kingdom
- Years active: 1988–present
- Label: Naxos Records
- Members: Julian Leaper; Ciaran McCabe; Martin Outram; Will Schofield
- Past members: Michal Kaznowski; David Angel; Laurence Jackson; David Juritz

The Maggini Quartet is a British string quartet. Its members are Julian Leaper (Violin 1), Ciaran McCabe (Violin 2), Martin Outram (Viola) and Will Schofield (Cello).

Formed in 1988, the Quartet is known for championing the British repertoire, and has made many CD recordings published through publishers such as Naxos Records. The Maggini Quartet appear regularly in concert series at home and abroad and are frequent media broadcasters.

Among other notable projects, they have recorded the complete Naxos Quartets cycle by Peter Maxwell Davies.

The Quartet's name derives from the famous 16th century Brescian violin maker Giovanni Paolo Maggini.
