= Symphony No. 9 (Davies) =

- by Peter Maxwell Davies
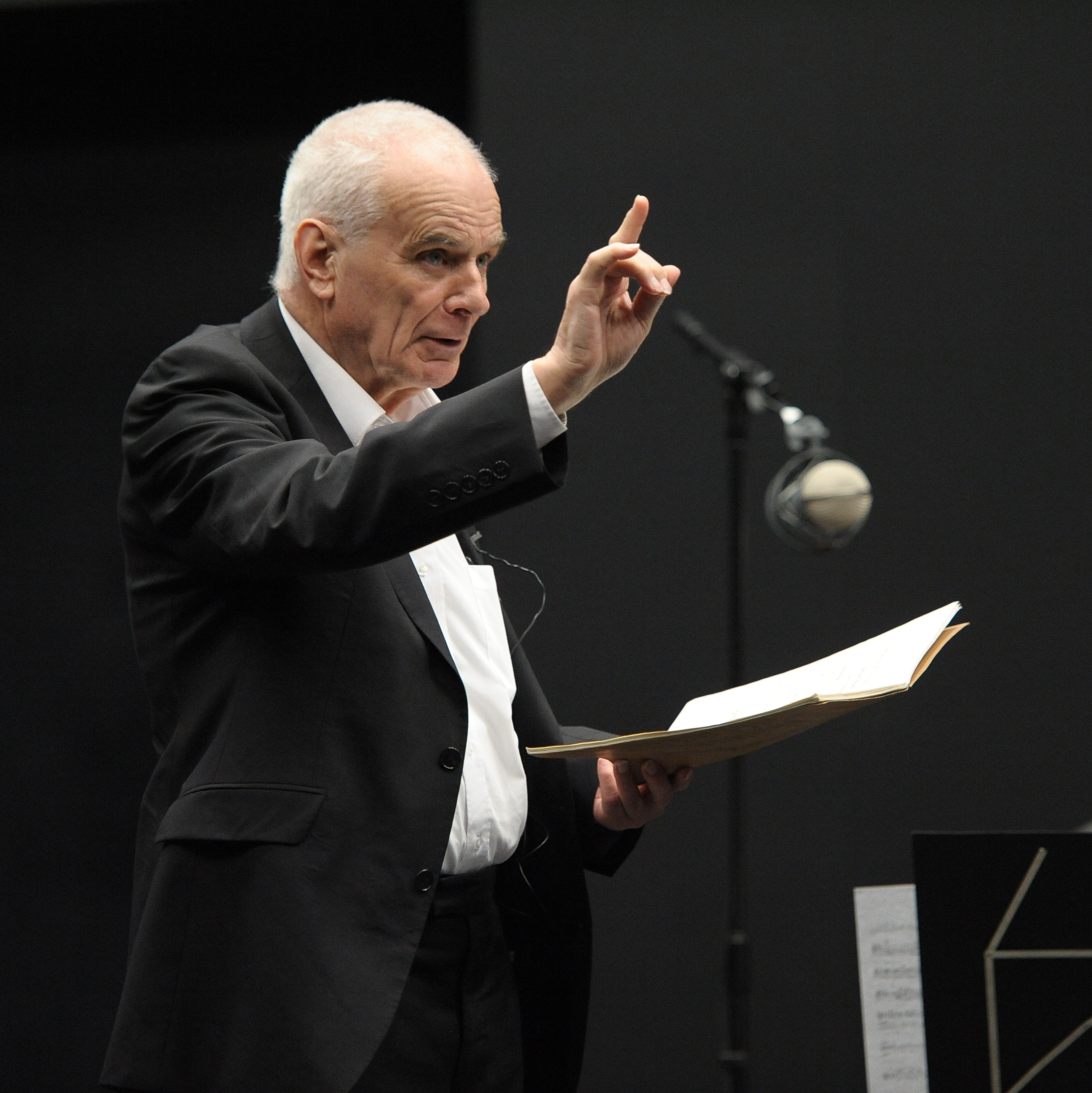
- The composer in 2012
- Opus: 315
- Occasion: Diamond Jubilee
- Dedication: Queen Elizabeth II

Premiere
- Date: 9 June 2012
- Conductor: Vasily Petrenko
- Performers: Royal Liverpool Philharmonic

The Symphony No. 9, Op. 315, is an orchestral composition by Peter Maxwell Davies, composed from December 2011 to March 2012, and dedicated to Queen Elizabeth II on the occasion of her diamond jubilee. It was premiered on 9 June 2012 by the Royal Liverpool Philharmonic, conducted by Vasily Petrenko.

== History ==
At the time of the premiere of his Eighth, Antarctic Symphony in 2001, Davies stated it would be his last symphony. By May 2010, he had changed his mind and announced he would compose a Ninth Symphony in honour of the diamond jubilee of Queen Elizabeth II.

== Character and materials ==
The work is scored for full orchestra with brass sextet. It is one continuous movement divided into two parts, part one consisting of a slow introduction followed by an allegro, part two which is slow throughout. Musical influences include medieval plainsong, 13th century polyphony, military marches and the string quartet Op. 54 no. 2 by Haydn. Cultural influences include the architecture of certain Christian churches and recent military interventions in Iraq and Afghanistan.
