= Trumpet Concerto (Davies) =

Trumpet Concerto by Peter Maxwell Davies

- by Peter Maxwell Davies
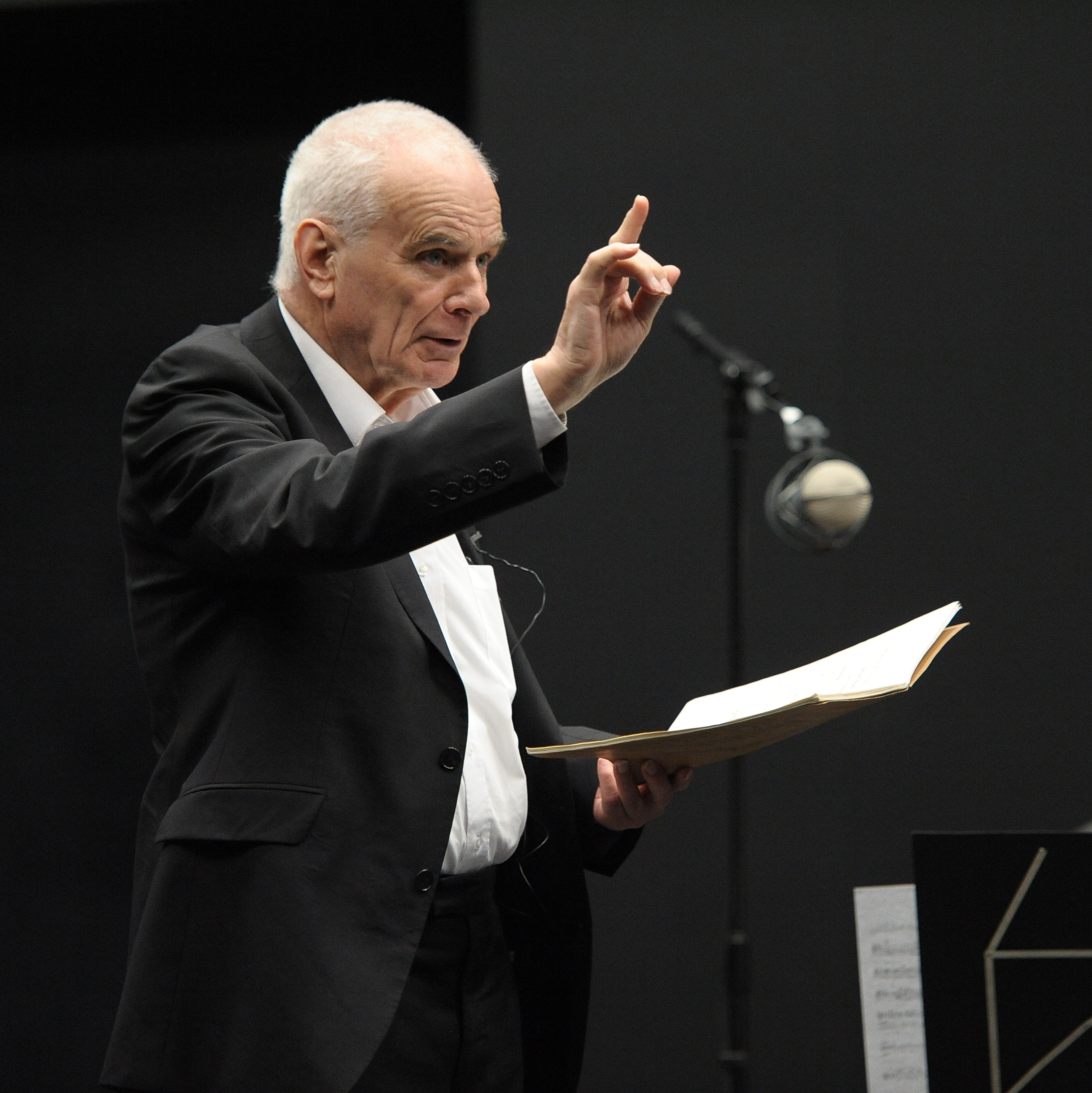
- The composer in 2012
- Movements: 3

Premiere
- Date: September 21, 1988
- Location: Hiroshima
- Conductor: Giuseppe Sinopoli
- Performers: John Wallace; Philharmonia Orchestra

The Concerto for Trumpet and Orchestra is a composition for trumpet solo and orchestra by the British composer Peter Maxwell Davies. The trumpet concerto was commissioned by the Philharmonia Orchestra for its then principal trumpeter John Wallace. It was given its world premiere by Wallace and the Philharmonia Orchestra under the conductor Giuseppe Sinopoli in Hiroshima on 21 September 1988.

== Composition ==
The Trumpet Concerto has a duration of roughly 28 minutes and is composed in three connected movements:

1. Adagio – Allegro
2. Adagio molto
3. Presto

Parts of the music are derived from the medieval plainsong Franciscus pauper et humilis, commonly associated with the Roman Catholic friar Francis of Assisi about whom Davies had intended to compose an unrealized opera.

The work is scored for a solo trumpet and a large orchestra comprising two flutes, alto flute, two oboes, cor anglais, two clarinets, bass clarinet, two bassoons, contrabassoon, four horns, three trumpets, three trombones, tuba, timpani, four percussionists, and strings.

== Reception ==
The Trumpet Concerto has been praised by music critics. Arnold Whittall of Gramophone wrote:

To an even greater extent than his earlier concertos it fills its generous length with an absorbing elaboration of diverser ideas, some brazenly bold, others affectingly simple. No doubt the nature of the trumpet itself helps to ensure that this is so, and Davies has written a solo part that is not only brilliant—and brilliantly effective—but that strikes sparks off an imposing orchestral contribution.

The work was similarly praised by Bernard Holland of The New York Times, who observed:

Potentially weighted down by so much gloom, the listener needs special points of interest, and Mr. Davies's varied speeds within what seems to be a single speed provide them. The casual ear perceives unified surges; the careful ear notes pools of slowness in the midst of them. In team-sport athletics, where evasiveness on the run is a stock in trade, an applicable phrase exists: change of pace.

== See also ==
- List of compositions by Peter Maxwell Davies
