= Strathclyde Concertos =

The Strathclyde Concertos are a series of ten orchestral works by the English composer Sir Peter Maxwell Davies.

== History and character ==
Commissioned by Strathclyde Regional Council, each work features an instrumental soloist and small orchestra. The first concerto, for oboe and orchestra, appeared in 1986, with the tenth and last work, for full orchestra in 1996, the year Strathclyde Regional Council was abolished.

Funding was also supplied by the Scottish Arts Council. The plan was that each concerto was to be used as a teaching tool. As each concerto was finished, a young composer chosen by the council would visit the schools in a particular region of Strathclyde and would address the students concerning the concerto and the process of its composition. Then, the students would be asked to create compositions of their own. Also, the soloist for each concerto would visit the schools in the region and discuss the concerto from the performer's point of view.

Davies spotlights the soloists in some of the concertos by eliminating the instrument's counterparts in the orchestra. In the First Strathclyde Concerto, for oboe (1986), the orchestra does not include any oboes or bassoons. Likewise, in the Third Strathclyde Concerto, for horn and trumpet (1989), Davies excludes all of the brass instruments from the orchestra. For the Sixth Strathclyde Concerto, for flute (1991), Davies went even farther by removing all of the flutes, oboes, and violins from the orchestra, and by severely limiting the trumpet parts. The fifth concerto, on the other hand, sets the solo violin and viola against a normal string orchestra, and the seventh also uses an orchestra with a normal string section to accompany the solo double bass. The most demanding of the solo parts most likely lies in the Second Strathclyde Concerto, for cello (1987). In the last two of the Strathclyde Concertos, Davies increased the number of soloists. The Ninth (1994) is scored for six woodwind soloists, while the Tenth (1996) is a concerto for orchestra whose finale is a sort of recapitulation of ideas heard in the earlier concertos.

The first two concertos were recorded by Unicorn-Kanchana, with the composer conducting. The remainder were recorded by Collins Classics.

== The concertos ==
- Strathclyde Concerto No. 1 (1986) for oboe and orchestra (First performance: 29 April 1988, at the City Halls, Glasgow, by Robin Miller and the Scottish Chamber Orchestra; conducted by the composer)
- Strathclyde Concerto No. 2 (1987) for cello and orchestra (First performance: 1 February 1989, at the City Halls, Glasgow, by William Conway and the Scottish Chamber Orchestra; conducted by the composer)
- Strathclyde Concerto No. 3 (1989) for horn, trumpet and orchestra (First performance: 19 January 1990, at the City Halls, Glasgow, by Robert Cook (horn), Peter Franks (trumpet) and the Scottish Chamber Orchestra; conducted by the composer).(First German performance: Markus Wittgens, horn / Otto Sauter, trumpet / Philharmonisches Staatsorchester Bremen / Conductor: Peter Maxwell Davies – Bremen (1994) It is in three movements, played without a break:
  - Adagio—Allegro moderato—cadenza
  - Andante—Lento—Tempo adagio—Lento
  - Allegro—Presto—Moderato—Adagio
- Strathclyde Concerto No. 4 (1990) for clarinet and orchestra (First performance: 21 November 1990, at the City Halls, Glasgow, by Lewis Morrison and the Scottish Chamber Orchestra; conducted by the composer)
- Strathclyde Concerto No. 5 (1991) for violin, viola and string orchestra (First performance: 13 March 1992, at the City Halls, Glasgow, by James Clark (violin), Catherine Marwood (viola) and the Scottish Chamber Orchestra; conducted by the composer). It is in three movements:
  - Adagio: stilo seicentesco—Allegro moderato
  - Allegro moderato—Adagio sostenuto
  - Allegro

This concerto is based on two pre-existent works: Haydn's overture L'isola disabitata and a two-part setting of the opening line of Ecclesiastes, "Vanitas vanitatum et omnia vanitas" by the early seventeenth-century composer Jan Albert Ban.

- Strathclyde Concerto No. 6 (1991) for flute and orchestra (First performance: 13 March 1992, at the City Halls, Glasgow, by David Nicholson and the Scottish Chamber Orchestra; conducted by the composer)
- Strathclyde Concerto No. 7 (1992) for double bass and orchestra (First performance: 24 November 1992, at the City Halls, Glasgow, by Duncan McTier and the Scottish Chamber Orchestra; conducted by the composer). It is in two numbered movements, with the second combining aspects of a slow movement and fast finale:
  - Moderato
  - Lento—Allegro—Lento—Adagio—Allegro molto
- Strathclyde Concerto No. 8 (1993) for bassoon and orchestra (First performance: 24 November 1993, at the City Halls, Glasgow, by Ursula Leveaux and the Scottish Chamber Orchestra; conducted by the composer)
- Strathclyde Concerto No. 9 (1994) for six woodwind instruments and string orchestra (First performance: 10 February 1995, at the City Halls, Glasgow, by David Nicholson (piccolo), Elizabeth Dooner (alto flute), Maurice Checker (cor anglais), Lewis Morrison (E♭ clarinet), Ruth Ellis (bass clarinet), Alison Green (contrabassoon) and the Scottish Chamber Orchestra; conducted by the composer)
- Strathclyde Concerto No. 10: Concerto for Orchestra (1996) (First performance: 30 October 1996, at the City Halls, Glasgow by the Scottish Chamber Orchestra; conducted by the composer)
