= Symphony No. 7 (Davies) =

- by Peter Maxwell Davies
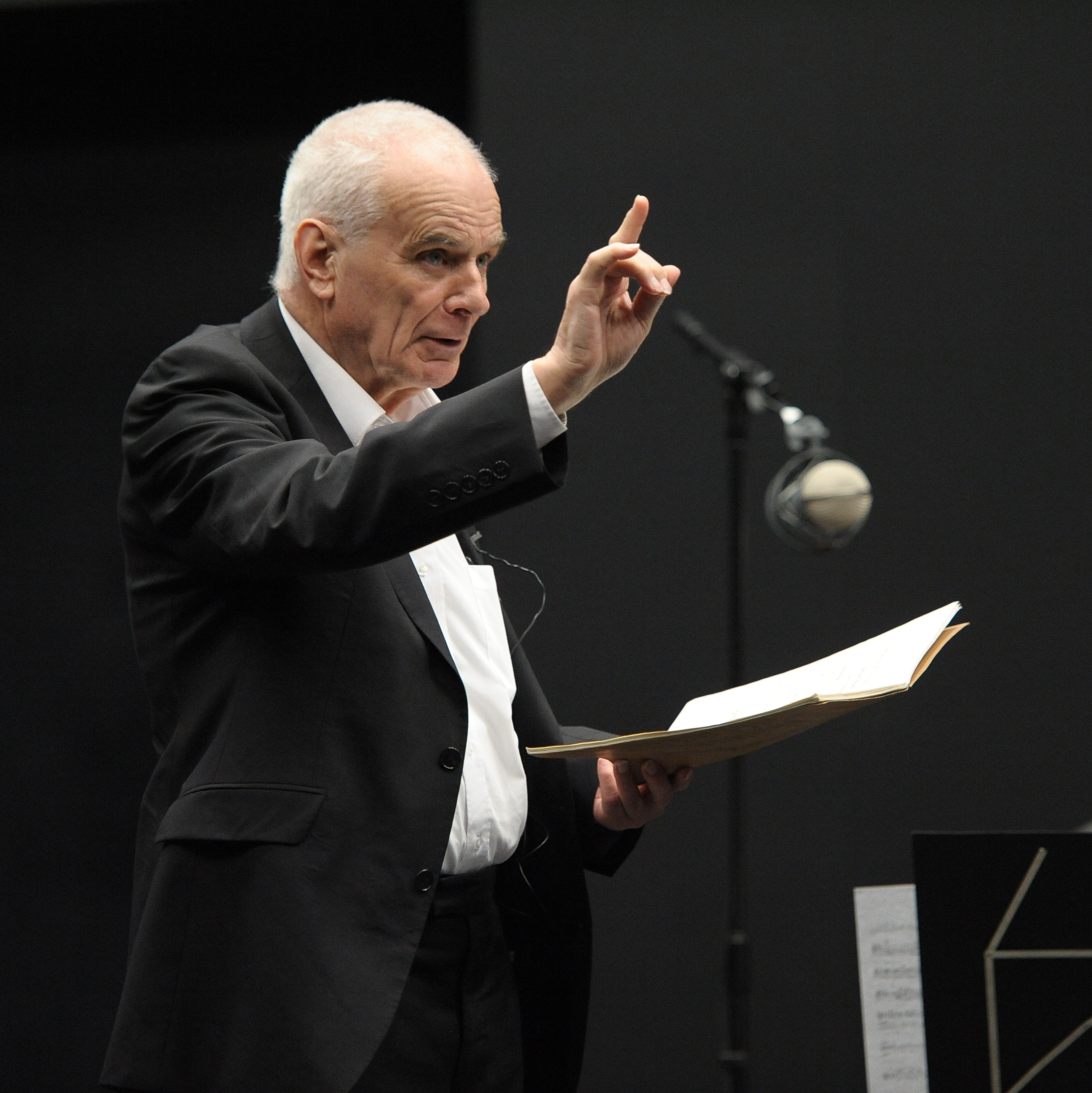
- The composer in 2012
- Movements: 4

Premiere
- Date: 19 June 2000
- Location: St Magnus Festival, Kirkwall
- Conductor: Peter Maxwell Davies
- Performers: BBC Philharmonic Orchestra

The Symphony No. 7 by Peter Maxwell Davies was composed in 2000. It was written for and dedicated to the BBC Philharmonic Orchestra, by whom it was premiered on 19 June 2000 at the St Magnus Festival, in the Pickaquoy Centre, Kirkwall, Orkney, conducted by the composer.

== Character and materials ==
Davies regards this symphony as part of a seven-member cycle, but not as its conclusion. Instead of ending, the Seventh Symphony forms a harmonic link to the opening of the First Symphony. The composer describes the Seventh as his "most classical" symphony, with particular dependence on the music of Joseph Haydn.

== Instrumentation ==
The symphony is scored for piccolo, two flutes (second doubling alto flute), two oboes, cor anglais, two clarinets, bass clarinet, two bassoons, double bassoon, four horns, three trumpets, three trombones, tuba, timpani (a tom-tom or roto-tom may be substituted for the piccolo timp), five percussionists (playing glockenspiel, marimba, crotales, tubular bells, 2 wood blocks (small, medium), tambourine, bubbolo, side drum, 2 bass drums (small, very large), antique cymbals, small suspended Chinese cymbal, clashed cymbals, 2 suspended cymbals (small, large), tam-tam), harp, celesta, and strings.

== Analysis ==
The symphony is in four movements:

1. Exposition
2. Minuet and Trio
3. Slow Movement
4. Development

The first movement behaves as the exposition section (only) of a symphonic movement, contrasting two types of musical material, both from each other, and from bridging music with less well-defined characteristics.

The second movement, in the classical form of a minuet and trio, was inspired by the op. 20 String Quartets of Haydn, though the musical surface does not sound like the Haydn models.

Although the composer points to the simple, two- and three-part string writing at the beginning of the third, slow movement, as representing the spirit and style of Haydn's middle period, the following build-up and climax has been seen as owing a heavy debt to Gustav Mahler.

The last movement is not a finale, but rather is titled "Development". Its dominant characteristic is that of the traditional development section of a classical symphony: systematic modulation through a succession of tonalities while, at the same time, ideas from earlier in the symphony are fragmented, reassembled, and reworked. After a dramatic accelerando, a quotation from the slow movement arrives, followed by an inconclusive ending that links to the opening of the First Symphony, "so that the whole cycle could start over again".
