= Symphony No. 5 (Davies) =

- by Peter Maxwell Davies
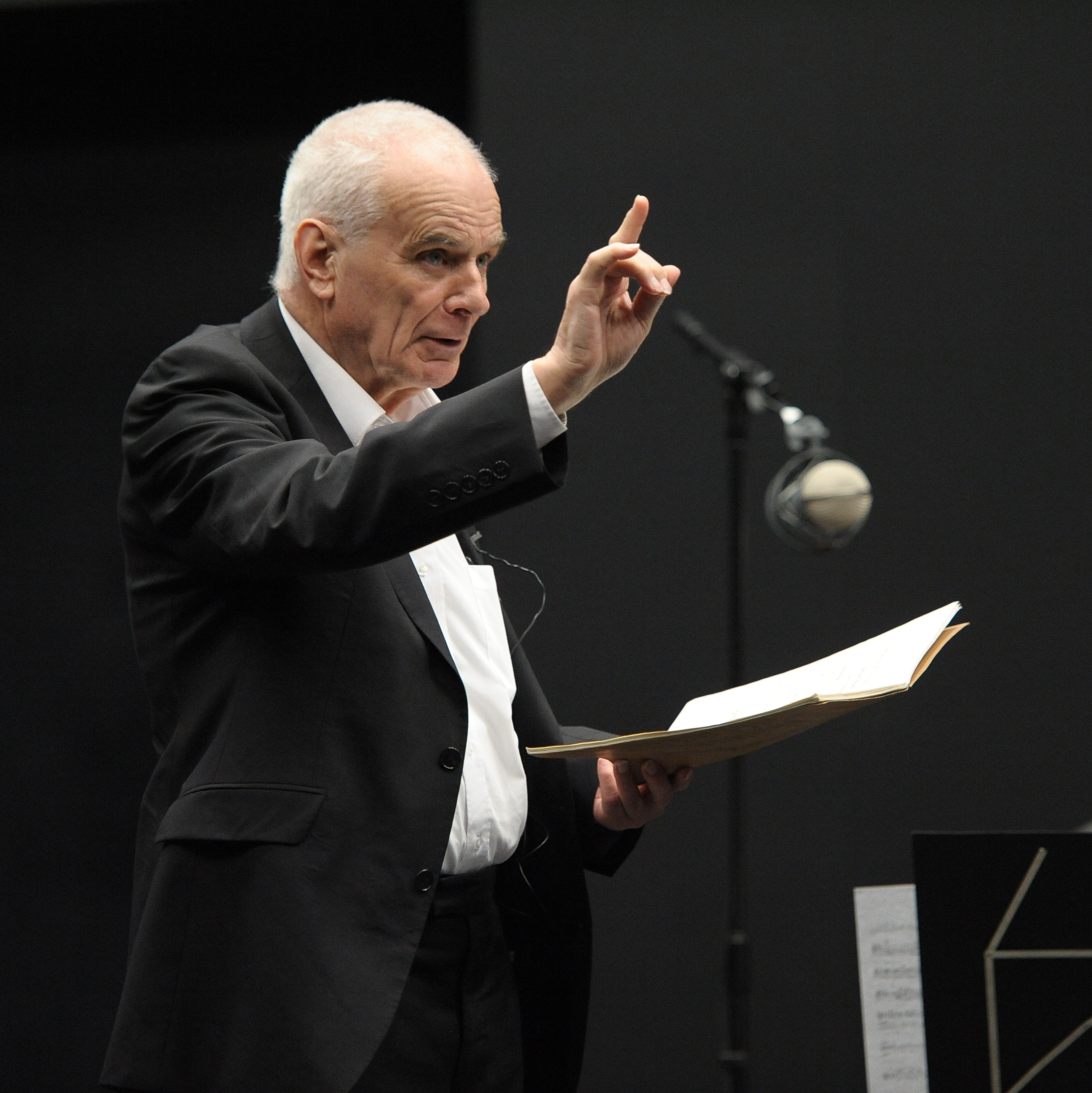
- The composer in 2012
- Based on: Davies' Chat Moss (1993)
- Recorded: 1995 (issued)

Premiere
- Date: 9 August 1994
- Location: Royal Albert Hall, London
- Conductor: Peter Maxwell Davies
- Performers: Philharmonia Orchestra

The Symphony No. 5 was composed by Peter Maxwell Davies in 1994 on commission from the Philharmonia Orchestra, who gave the world premiere under the composer's direction at a BBC Promenade concert on 9 August 1994 at the Royal Albert Hall in London.

== Character and materials ==
The form of the symphony (along with those of its predecessors) owes a great debt to the symphonies of Sibelius, in this case particularly the Seventh. However, its sense of space, "less architectural than that of the previous symphonies, is a significant new departure, allowing a more relaxed attitude toward musical objects: closer to the Mahlerian aesthetic than at any time since the 1960s". Davies has also cited the often canonic modal counterpoint of Sibelius's Sixth Symphony as an influence, and Sibelius's tone poem En saga has also been mentioned as a possible source of inspiration.

== Instrumentation ==
The symphony is scored for 2 flutes (second doubling alto flute), piccolo, 2 oboes, cor anglais, 2 clarinets, bass clarinet, 2 bassoons, double bassoon, 4 horns, 3 trumpets, 3 trombones, tuba, timpani, percussion (marimba, glockenspiel, crotales, flexatone, 2 bass drums [small and large], cymbals, suspended cymbal, tambourine), celesta, harp, and strings.

== Analysis ==
On the model of Sibelius's Seventh, the symphony suggests the traditional four-movement form, but is cast in a single movement. It nevertheless forms an "archipelago of 34 sections of various length". The Symphony is based on material from Davies's 1993 youth-orchestra composition Chat Moss, which in turn is derived from two plainchants, the Easter gradual "Haec dies" and the Good Friday tract "Domine audivi" from Habakkuk 3:3. It begins with an expansive adagio introduction, followed by music of great energy, characterised by an alternation of stable and unstable episodes. The overall tonality of D♭/C♯ with a G secondary pole is established at the outset in a woodwind trio, followed by undisguised modal melodies in the violins and flute. The succeeding faster music reaches a first climax in a Davies hallmark of ascending brass figures with powerful, sustained tritones in the horns that forecast a bigger climax to come, an affirmational brass theme at rehearsal Q2 which "seems to rise as if from the sea, magnifying the fragile flute melody heard at N2 into sudden immensity".

== Discography ==
- Peter Maxwell Davies: Symphony no. 5; Chat moss; Cross Lane fair; Five Klee Pictures. Philharmonia Orchestra; BBC Philharmonic; Sir Peter Maxwell Davies, conductor. CD recording. Collins Classics 14602. [UK]: Lambourne Productions, 1995.
