= Symphony No. 4 (Davies) =

- by Peter Maxwell Davies
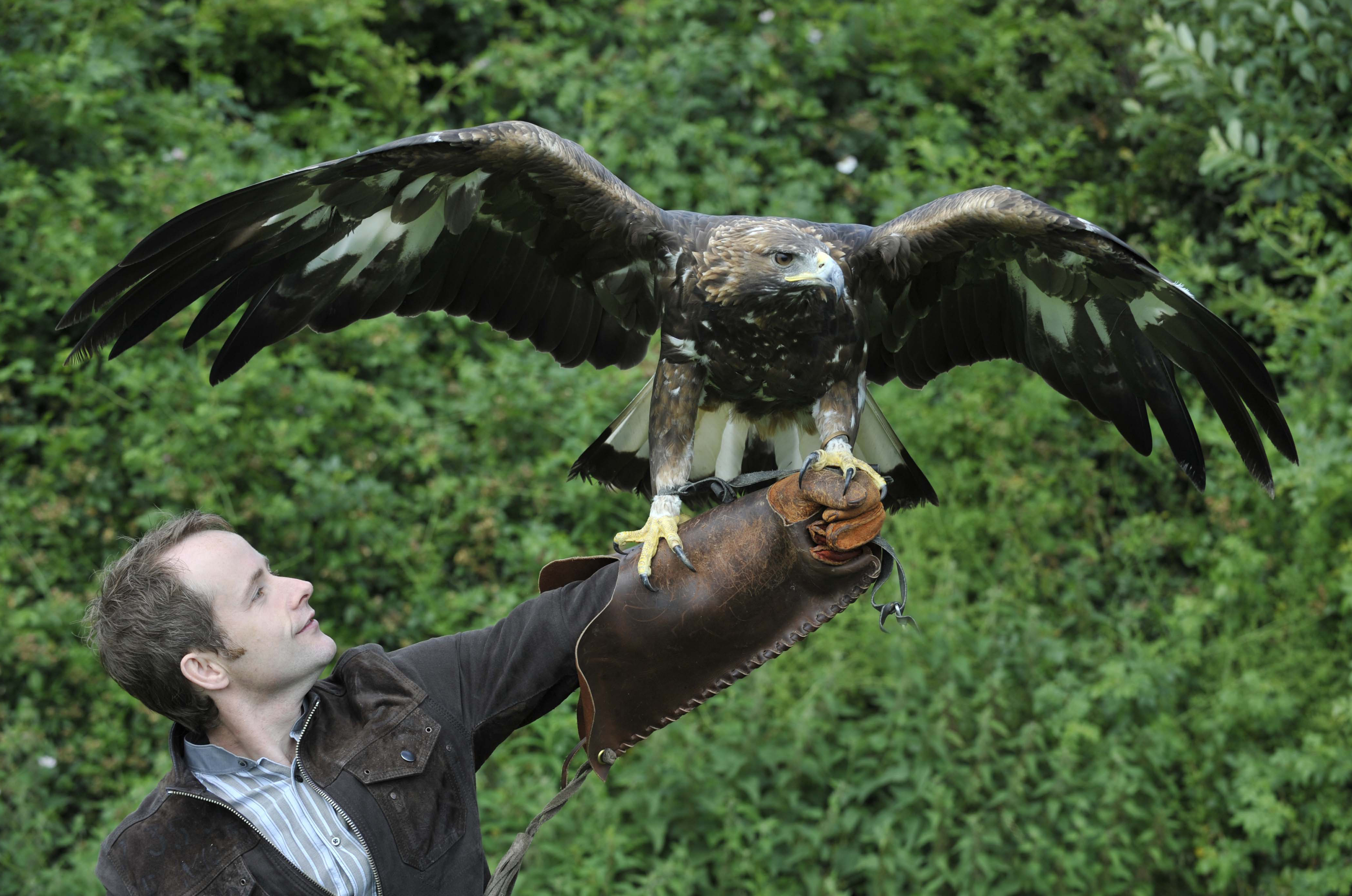
- A golden eagle taking flight was one source of inspiration for the symphony
- Based on: "Adorna thalamum tuum, Sion"
- Dedication: John Tunnell
- Recorded: April 1990
- Movements: 4

Premiere
- Date: 10 September 1989
- Location: Royal Albert Hall, London
- Conductor: Peter Maxwell Davies
- Performers: Scottish Chamber Orchestra

The Symphony No. 4 by Peter Maxwell Davies was commissioned for the Scottish Chamber Orchestra by Christian Salvesen plc and composed in 1989. It is dedicated to the memory of the violinist John Tunnell, who had been leader of the orchestra, and was premiered at the Royal Albert Hall on a BBC Promenade Concert on 10 September 1989, with the composer conducting the Scottish Chamber Orchestra.

== Character and materials ==
The Fourth Symphony differs from its predecessors in several respects, but particularly for combining the conventional four movements into a single unit, similar to Arnold Schoenberg's Chamber Symphony No. 1, Op. 9, only on a larger scale. On the other hand, like Davies's earlier symphonies, the symphony stems from a mixture of a plainchant source on the one hand, and a moment in the composer's personal experience on the other. The plainchant "Adorna thalamum tuum, Sion", for a Feast of the Purification of the Virgin Mary (a processional chant with candles) is transformed by the composer into different but related sets of seven, nine, and ten notes, which are used as the basic pitch materials of the symphony. Such transformational treatment of plainchant melodies has been a characteristic of Davies's music since the 1957 sextet Alma Redemptoris Mater The second source was the haunting sight of a golden eagle taking flight at sunrise, which the composer did not attempt to portray literally.

== Instrumentation ==
The symphony is scored for a scaled-down orchestra of two flutes (2nd doubling piccolo and alto flute), two oboes (2nd doubling cor anglais), two clarinets (2nd doubling bass clarinet), two bassoons (2nd doubling double bassoon), two horns, two trumpets, timpani, and strings. These forces reflect Davies's exploration at that time especially of the symphonies of Haydn and Mozart, in his capacity as associate conductor of the Scottish Chamber Orchestra.

== Analysis ==
The symphony is in four movements, though they are played without break:

1. Moderato
2. Allegro
3. Adagio
4. Andante – Allegro

The symphony begins with a sort of "ghost sonata" with a disguised recapitulation. A short Adagio transition at the end seems to be preparing for a following slow movement, a forecast contradicted by the actual nature of the second movement—a musical trompe-l'oeil or "contradictory anticipation". It is the first of a series of "one-sided parentheses" refracting the structure toward a series of three short, concentrated statements at the very end of the symphony. The second movement unexpectedly proves to be a scherzo instead of the slow movement forecast by the transition from the end of the first movement. However, the Adagio third movement occurs instead of the expected central trio, and the scherzo "forgets to come back", being replaced by the finale.
