= Symphony No. 6 (Davies) =

- by Peter Maxwell Davies
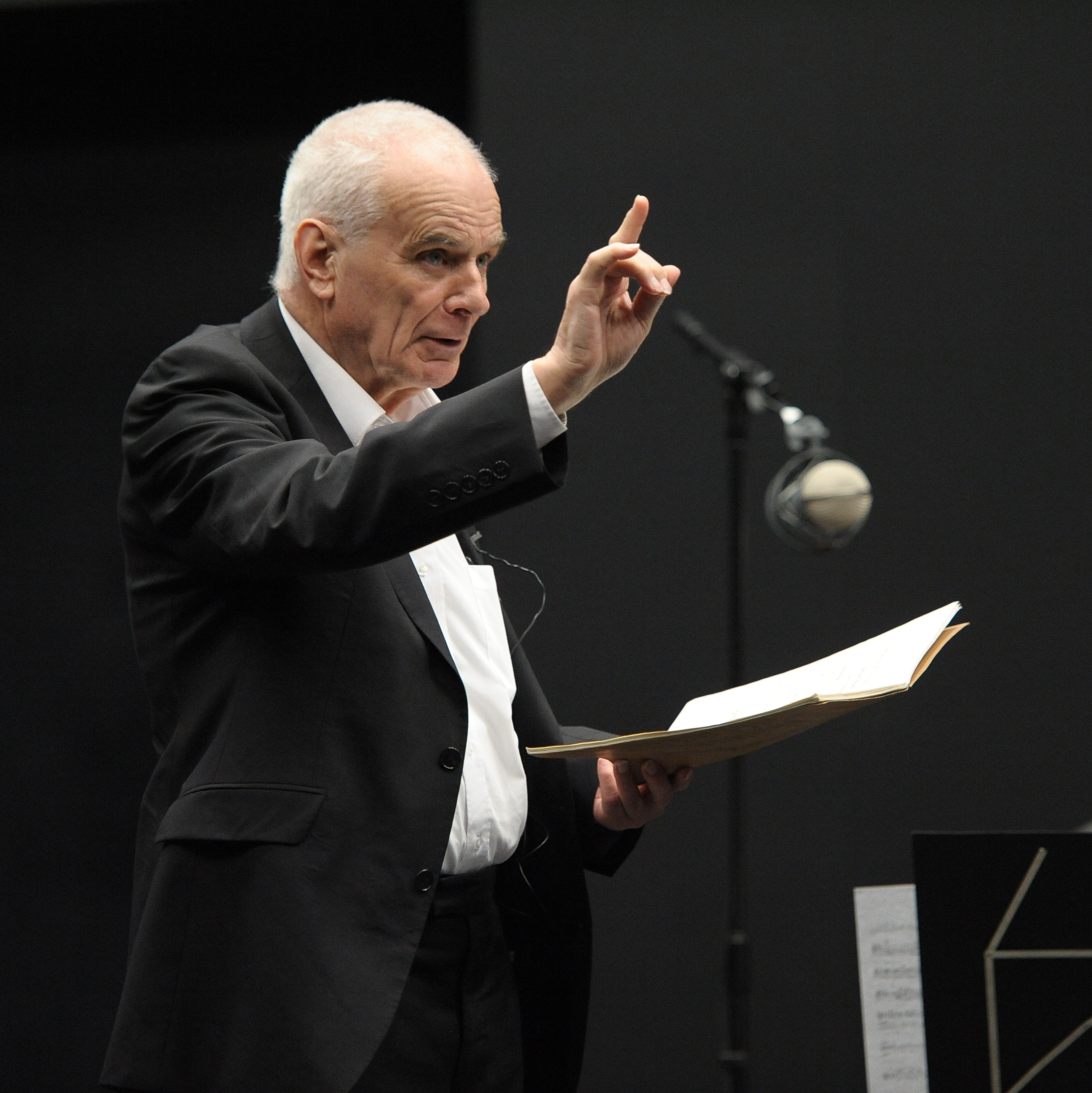
- The composer in 2012
- Dedication: George Mackay Brown
- Movements: 3

Premiere
- Date: 22 June 1996
- Location: St Magnus Festival, Kirkwall
- Conductor: Peter Maxwell Davies
- Performers: Royal Philharmonic Orchestra

The Symphony No. 6 by Peter Maxwell Davies was composed in Hoy during the first half of 1996, and was premiered on 22 June of the same year in the Phoenix Cinema, Kirkwall, as part of the twentieth St Magnus Festival, Orkney, by the Royal Philharmonic Orchestra conducted by the composer. The work was written with specific members of the RPO in mind, and is dedicated to the memory of the poet George Mackay Brown, who died on the day the symphony was completed.

== Character and materials ==
The symphony sets out at the beginning from a slow Australian aboriginal tune, as reworked in Davies's Time and the Raven, composed the previous year, and returns to it at the end. Over the course of the symphony this theme is subjected to continual transformations. As with many of Davies's works from the time of the First Symphony onward, the Sixth Symphony establishes its own set of harmonic rules, with its own "tonics" and "dominants".

== Instrumentation ==
The symphony is scored for piccolo, two flutes (2nd doubling alto flute), two oboes, cor anglais, two clarinets, bass clarinet, two bassoons, double bassoon, four horns, three trumpets, three trombones, tuba, timpani, five percussionists (playing glockenspiel, crotales, marimba, two wood blocks, tambourine, side drum, two bass drums, two suspended cymbals, crash cymbals, rain sticks), harp, celesta, and strings.

== Analysis ==
The symphony is in three movements:

1. Adagio – Allegro
2. Adagio non troppo – Allegro
3. Adagio – più animato

After the presentation of the slow theme as an introduction, the first movement becomes a "scherzo masquerading as a sonata-allegro". The opening Aboriginal-derived theme is clearly centred on E, and after wandering into other areas, the movement settles back onto E at the end, with one of the secondary pitches, B, above it. The second movement reproduces the pattern of the first in many respects: a slow introduction, followed by faster music over a slower-moving background, as a sonata-allegro masquerading as a scherzo—the reverse of the first movement's disguise. The initial tonality once again focusses on E, but soon gives way to B and a collection of minor-third related centres: D, F and G♯. Later, the tonality shifts to B, D, and F and the movement closes with a violent passage successively centred on B, F, and finally D.

After two fast movements the finale is essentially a slow one. Like the other two, it begins with an introduction, only briefer this time, followed by transformations now attempting to reconcile everything from the diverse elements of the first and second movements. This synthesis is reflected in the tonalities. When the Aboriginal theme returns at letter U, it is supported by a timpani tattoo, first on B, then on F, then alternating D, B, and F, finally settling quietly onto a low D. This leaves the ambiguous feeling that the tonic may be E and the dominant B, or the tonic may be B with dominants D, F, and G♯.
