= Markus Butter =

Austrian opera singer

Markus Butter (born 1973) is an Austrian operatic baritone.

== Career ==
Born in Bruck an der Mur, Butter was a member and soloist of the Vienna Boys' Choir from 1982 to 1986 and graduated in 1991 at the Stiftsgymnasium Kremsmünster. He received his further education at the Johann-Joseph-Fux-Konservatorium Graz and from 1994 at the University of Music and Performing Arts Graz.

Also in 1994 he began to work as an oratorio and lieder singer in Austria and Germany. From 1998 to 1999 he was a member of the Junge Ensemble of the Bavarian State Opera and from 1999 he was a member of the Bavarian State Opera. Afterwards he moved to the Deutsche Oper am Rhein and in 2005 to the Semperoper Dresden.

Guest performances led him to the Aalto-Theater in Essen (2014), to the Bregenzer Festspiele (2014) and several times to the Theater an der Wien (2010, 2011, 2015).

== Roles (selection) ==
- 2014–2015: Dr. Falke (Die Fledermaus), Semperoper
- 2014–2015: Der Sprecher (The Magic Flute), Semperoper
- 2014–2015: Rittmeister, Beichtvater (Geschichten aus dem Wiener Wald by HK Gruber), Bregenzer Festspiele, Theater an der Wien
- Flandrischer Deputierter (Don Carlo), Bavarian State Opera
- Gerichtsdiener (Was ihr wollt), Bavarian State Opera
- Hauptmann (Simon Boccanegra), Bavarian State Opera
- Kuligin (Katja Kabanowa), Bavarian State Opera
- Moralès (Carmen), Bavarian State Opera
- Masetto (Don Giovanni), Theater an der Wien

== Awards ==
- 1997: 2nd prize at the international competition "Das Schubertlied" in Vienna
- 2009: Christel-Goltz-Prize
