= Symphony No. 3 (Davies) =

1985 symphony by Peter Maxwell Davies

- by Peter Maxwell Davies
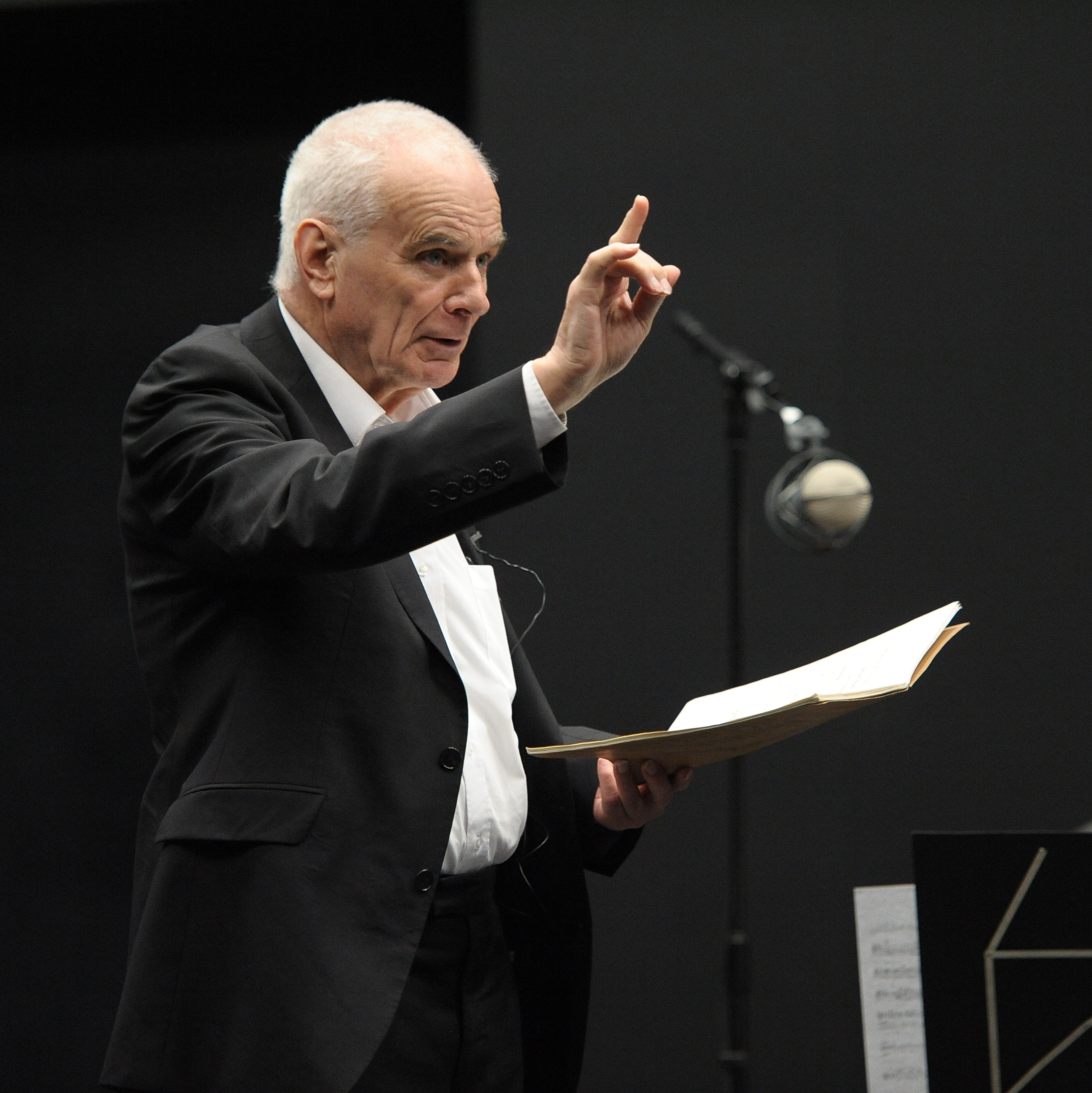
- The composer in 2012
- Recorded: 19 February 1985
- Movements: 4

Premiere
- Date: 19 February 1985
- Location: Free Trade Hall, Manchester
- Conductor: Edward Downes
- Performers: BBC Philharmonic

The Symphony No. 3 by Peter Maxwell Davies was composed in 1984 on a commission from the BBC Philharmonic, who gave the world premiere on 19 February 1985, at the Free Trade Hall in Manchester, with Edward Downes conducting.

== Character and materials ==
The form of the symphony, along with those of its predecessors, owes a great debt to the symphonies of Sibelius. A second influence came from Renaissance architecture, particularly the churches of Filippo Brunelleschi. Davies explains that his use of Fibonacci numbers to proportion the symphony was modelled directly on Brunelleschi's structures.

== Instrumentation ==
The symphony is scored for 3 flutes (second doubling alto flute, third doubling piccolo), 2 oboes, cor anglais, 2 clarinets, bass clarinet, 2 bassoons, double bassoon, 4 horns, 3 trumpets, 3 trombones, tuba, timpani, and strings. Unlike the preceding two symphonies, the only percussion instruments employed in the Third are the timpani. Here they often assume a solo role (even more than in the Second Symphony) in order to emphasize the focal pitch classes.

== Analysis ==
The symphony is in four movements:

1. Lento – Adagio – Andante – Moderato – Allegretto – Allegro moderato – Allegro – Allegro alla breve
2. Scherzo I. Allegro
3. Scherzo II. Allegro vivace: scorrevole e bisbigliando
4. Lento – Adagio flessibile

Each of these movements is based on the same architectural outline, but expresses it with a different constructional technique. In addition, this same outline informs the construction of the symphony as a whole, and is also used as the basis of subdividing sections of each movement.

=== I. Lento – Adagio – Andante – Moderato – Allegretto – Allegro moderato – Allegro – Allegro alla breve ===
The symphony begins with a movement approximating the traditional sonata-allegro form. It begins in slow tempo in the tonality of D, quoting in the flutes a plainsong addressed to the Archangel Michael, "Sancte Michael Archangele, defende nos in praelio", and the movement becomes progressively faster until the opening material and tonality returns and "the music is blown right away, as if it were on scurrying air-currents".

The pitches of the chant are first "sieved" by to retain only the first occurrence of pitch classes. This results in a seven-note sequence, which is expanded to an eight-note set by the arbitrary addition of D. This set is then arranged in an 8 x 8 transposition square (where the row is transposed successively to begin on each of its eight pitches), and this square is manipulated according to the 64-element Magic Square of Mercury.

At the same time, durations are built according to Fibonacci numbers descending from 21 downwards, with each number representing a multiple of a breve unit. Within this process of acceleration the pitch material converges onto a centre of F which, together with B and A♭, forms an alternative tonal centre to the tonic D throughout the symphony.

=== II. Scherzo I. Allegro ===
The second and third movements are a pair of scherzos. The composer likens the second movement to the visual experience of contemplating a Brunelleschi church nave from a fixed central point. In addition, there was a "physical inspiration", of nesting seabirds wheeling around a towering cliff face.

=== III. Scherzo II. Allegro vivace: scorrevole e bisbigliando ===
The second of the pair of scherzos distorts the perspective of the first, as if the same nave were being seen from one side. In this movement, the composer consciously borrows a device from the "Burlesque" movement of Mahler's Ninth Symphony, "where the tumult stops and the composer lets in 'windows'", through which slow passages of the adagio finale are glimpsed.

The form of the third movement affects the finale in three ways. First, the "windows" disrupt the musical continuity of the previous two movements, and thereby "reducing, but not totally avoiding, the likelihood of an archetypal formal design being used in the finale". Second, the windows' tonality of C♯, the modal dominants G♯ and F, and the diatonic dominant A (all established by the timpani), anticipate the finale. Thirdly, the windows sections, characterised by texture rather than by motif, recur twice in the finale.

=== IV. Lento – Adagio flessibile ===
The finale then returns to the material of the first movement, and develops it more amply.

On the largest scale, the four movements of the symphony combine into a single, overarching "meta-sonata form". All four movements, however, resist structural closure by denying the tonic's usual function of asserting its superiority at the end, and an important aspect of the formal unfolding of the entire work is the oscillation between sections having tonal focus on the one hand with others of a tonally ambiguous polyphony.

== Discography ==
- Peter Maxwell Davies: Symphony No. 3. BBC Philharmonic, Dennis Simons (leader), Edward Downes (conductor). BBC Artium. LP recording. BBC REGL 560. CD recording. BBC CD 560 X. [London?]: BBC Enterprises, 1985
- Maxwell Davies: Symphony No. 3. BBC Philharmonic, Sir Peter Maxwell Davies (conductor). CD recording. Collins Classics 14162. St Mary Cray, Orpington, Kent: Lambourne Productions, 1994.
