= Symphony No. 8 (Davies) =

Orchestral composition by Peter Maxwell Davies

- Antarctic Symphony
- by Peter Maxwell Davies
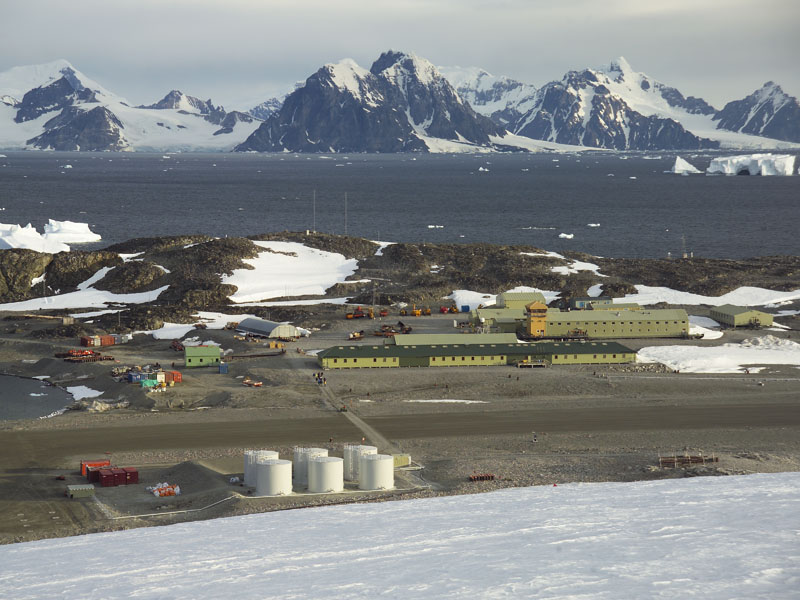
- Rothera Research Station (BAS main centre for fieldwork) where Davies was based during his visit to Antarctica

Premiere
- Date: 10 May 2001
- Location: Royal Festival Hall
- Conductor: Peter Maxwell Davies
- Performers: Philharmonia Orchestra

The Symphony No. 8 (also called the Antarctic Symphony) is an orchestral composition by Peter Maxwell Davies, completed on 15 December 2001.

== History ==
Davies had announced prior to its premiere that his Seventh Symphony was to be his last work in the form. Less than six months later, Davies amended his statement to say that it was only the last of a seven-symphony cycle: "No. 8, next year, will be a musical account of my visit to Antarctica, with very different aims and preoccupations." Advance publicity for the Eighth proved to be more than that for the other seven symphonies put together.

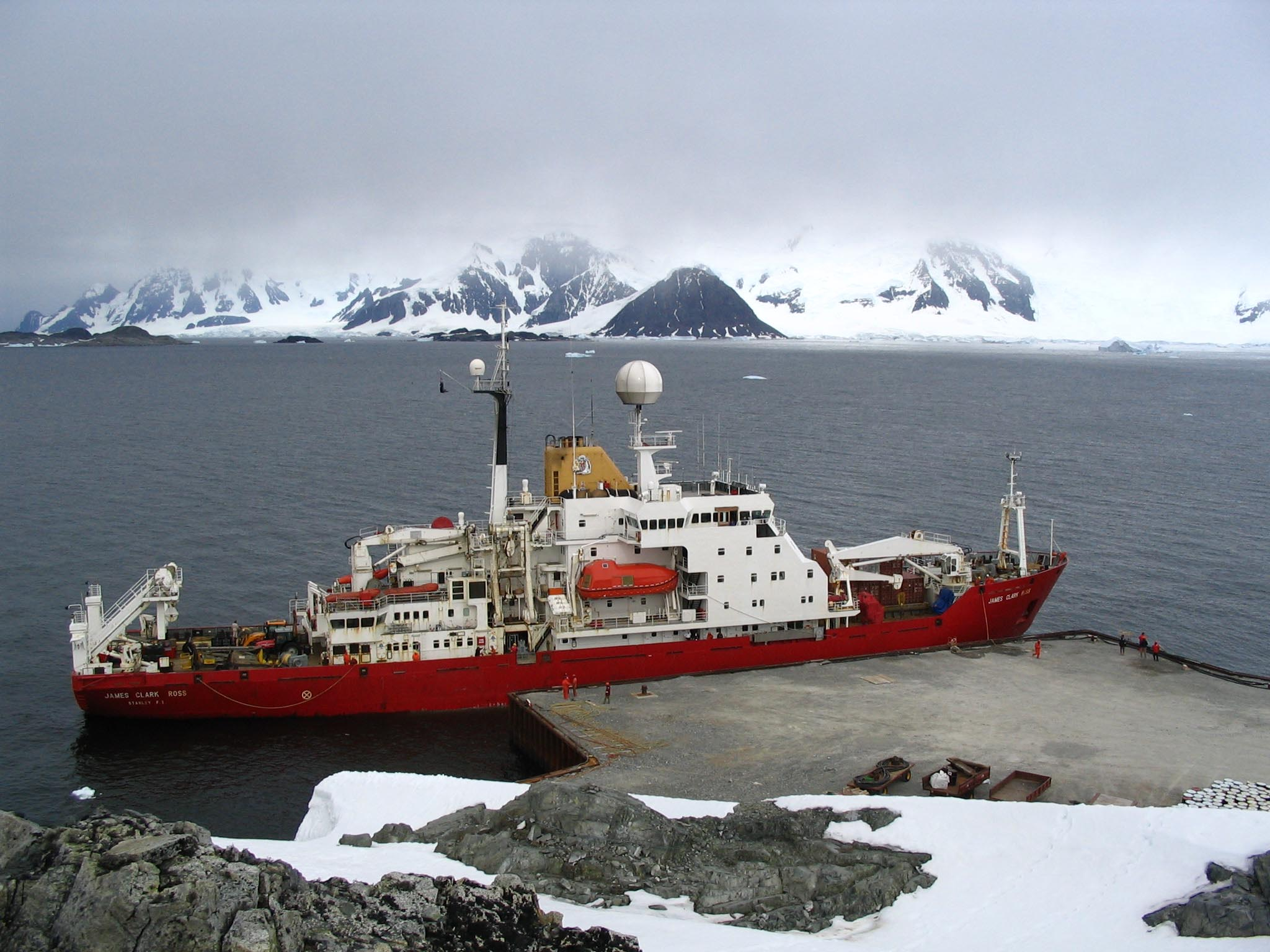
Davies sailed from the Falklands to Antarctica on RRS James Clark Ross, shown here in port at Rothera Station

Three years earlier the British Antarctic Survey (BAS), which was seeking to promote the region's significance, had asked the Philharmonia Orchestra to recommend a composer for the commission of an orchestral work intended to commemorate the fiftieth anniversary of Ralph Vaughan Williams's score for the 1948 film Scott of the Antarctic and the Seventh Symphony (Sinfonia antartica) which he fashioned out of that film score. Davies, as a committed environmentalist, was chosen. Terms of the commission required the composer to visit Antarctica, which he did for three weeks from late December 1997 to January 1998. The composer published his diary of the trip as an illustrated book, Notes from a Cold Climate. The composer also revealed that the symphony reflects his experience of having heard Vaughan Williams's Seventh at its first performance in Manchester in 1953. In the end, Davies decided that his new work would also be a symphony.

Davies conducted the Philharmonia Orchestra in the premiere of his Antarctic Symphony at the Royal Festival Hall in London, on 6 May 2001. At this time, Davies once more announced that this would be absolutely his last symphony. This time it would take him ten years to change his mind.

== Character and materials ==
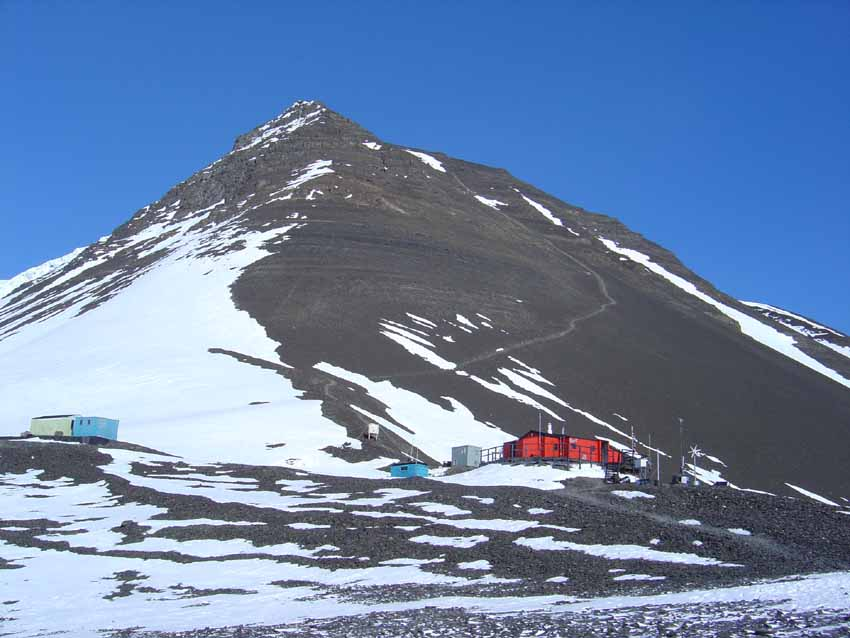
View from Fossil Bluff Main Hut (BAS), which Davies visited in 1997–98

Davies said he was "greatly influenced by my encounter with scientists searching into ways in which the Antarctic will change our environment over the coming centuries". The sounds of two particular events in his polar journey were incorporated directly into the symphony. The BAS had flown the composer to the Falklands, but from there onward it was a sea voyage. In his journal, Davies described hearing "the ice crack and split before the bow, then roar along, keel to stern, in a tumultuous clatter of slabs and shards", and this sound is represented at the beginning of the symphony through the percussive use of a biscuit tin filled with broken glass, a tam-tam with plastic soapdish, and three lengths of builders' scaffolding. The second sound was of an avalanche as the ship passed through a narrow channel between ice mountains. The composer described the sound that suddenly enveloped the ship as "the mightiest, gentlest, longest whisper ever. It was a sound which seemed almost quieter than the silence which surrounded it". These two sounds, of an ice-break and an avalanche, suggested using a Pentecost plainsong associated with the descent of the Holy Spirit upon the Apostles, which Davies had used before: "Dum complerentur dies pentecostes erant omnes pariter dicentes: Alleluia. Et subito factus est sonus de coelo ... Tamquam spiritus vehementis" (And when the day of Pentecost was fully come, they were all with one accord in one place saying: Alleluia. And suddenly there came a sound from heaven ... as of a mighty rushing wind).

== Instrumentation ==
The symphony is scored for piccolo, two flutes, two oboes, cor anglais, two clarinets, bass clarinet, two bassoons, double bassoon, four horns, three trumpets, three trombones, tuba, timpani with Japanese temple gong and 2 cymbals, four percussionists (xylophone, glockenspiel, marimba, crotales, tubular bells, bell tree, very small high woodblock, tambourine, side drum, 2 bass drums (small, very large), Chinese cymbals, clash cymbals, 4 suspended cymbals (very small, small, medium, large), nipple gong, tam-tam (with plastic soap-dish), tuned brandy glasses (with water), 2 small pebbles, football rattle, biscuit tin (filled with broken glass), 3 lengths of metal builder's scaffolding (5 inches or 18 cm, 12 inches or 30 cm, 16 inches or 40 cm) to be hit by a mallet), harp, celesta, strings.

== Analysis ==
The symphony is in a single movement divided into five sections, reflecting the five movements of Vaughan Williams's Seventh. It is constructed symmetrically around a central scherzo, preceded and followed by slow sections, and faster music at the beginning and end. A brief introduction is followed by an allegro exposition featuring sharply contrasting dynamics. The first slow section begins with a simple clarinet melody accompanied by pizzicato cellos. Material from the introduction is then developed in a faster tempo, leading into the central scherzo which recalls Davies's An Orkney Wedding with Sunrise. This ends with an episode describing the litter left behind by early Antarctic expeditions, represented here by quotations from Davies's own recent works, followed by the second slow section, with glittering icy sounds overlaying earlier material. The final fast section transforms the ideas from the exposition, representing the changing shape of partially thawing icebergs in midsummer, and a slower coda brings back elements from the introduction.
