= An Orkney Wedding, with Sunrise =

An Orkney Wedding, with Sunrise is a classical orchestral composition by the English composer Peter Maxwell Davies. It is notable for being one of the few pieces in classical repertoire to feature a bagpipe solo.

One of Davies's lighter pieces, it lasts for approximately twelve minutes, and vividly depicts the riotous celebrations after a wedding in Orkney. The piece closes with the entry of the bagpipes, which Davies describes as symbolic of the rising sun over Caithness. In concert performance, the piper, dressed in traditional Scottish regalia, is required to enter the hall from the back, parading to the stage and taking the soloist's position only as the piece concludes.

It was written to a commission by the Boston Pops Orchestra, who premiered it under John Williams with Nancy Crutcher Tunnicliffe as bagpipe soloist on May 10, 1985. It has since been performed and recorded many times (twice by the composer himself) and has been established as one of Davies's most enduringly popular pieces.
