= Naxos Quartets =

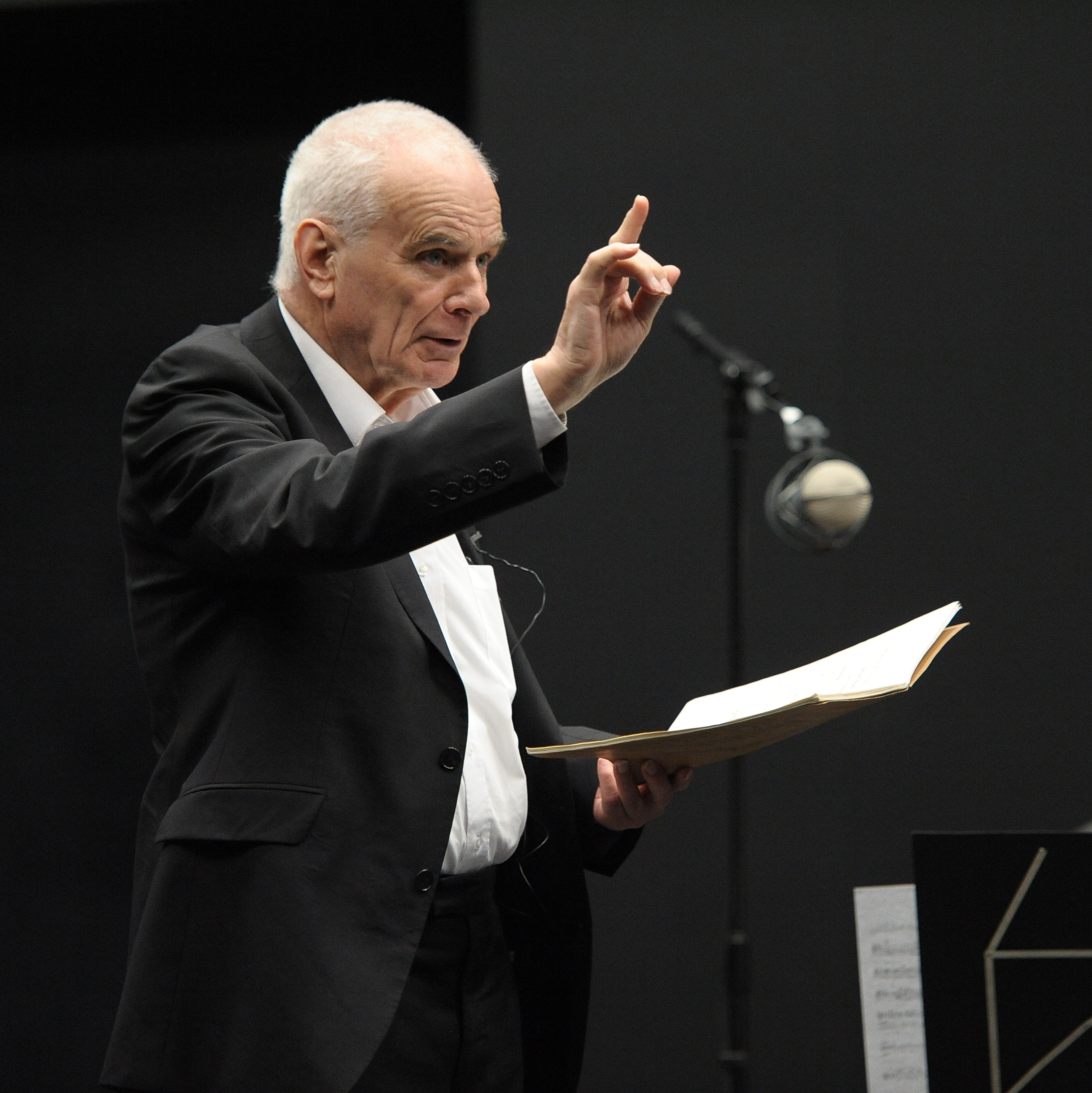
Peter Maxwell Davies in 2012

The Naxos Quartets are a series of ten string quartets by the English composer Peter Maxwell Davies.

They were written between 2001 and 2007 to a commission from Naxos Records. In 2001 the Maggini Quartet was appointed to record all ten for the record label. The first quartet was premiered by the Magginis at the Wigmore Hall on 17 October 2002. The series of quartets can be considered a multi-installment "novel".

Not all of the quartets have explicit extra-musical references, although the landscape and culture of Davies' adopted Orkney remain ever present. Davies has stated that the Third Quartet is a manifestation of his feelings of outrage at the invasion of Iraq in 2003. By contrast the Fourth Quartet, subtitled Children's Games, takes as its inspiration Pieter Bruegel the Elder's eponymous painting of 1560. The Fifth Quartet uses a motif of the flashing of lighthouses in Orkney. The Seventh Quartet is a tribute to the Baroque architect Francesco Borromini; the Eighth Quartet, based on John Dowland's Queen Elizabeth's Galliard, is dedicated to Queen Elizabeth II on the occasion of her eightieth birthday. The Ninth is dedicated to the mathematician Dame Kathleen Ollerenshaw who published several papers on magic squares, mathematical objects that Davies has described as 'a generating principle' for musical composition.

The string quartets are not Davies' only work in the genre: his first published composition was a movement for string quartet, and he produced a mature quartet in 1961. Two Little Quartets appeared in 1980 and 1987. There is also the unfinished final String Quartet (2016, op. 338), of which only the first movement was completed.

All ten quartets are now available on five discs or downloads from Naxos Records.
