= Symphony No. 1 (Davies) =

- by Peter Maxwell Davies
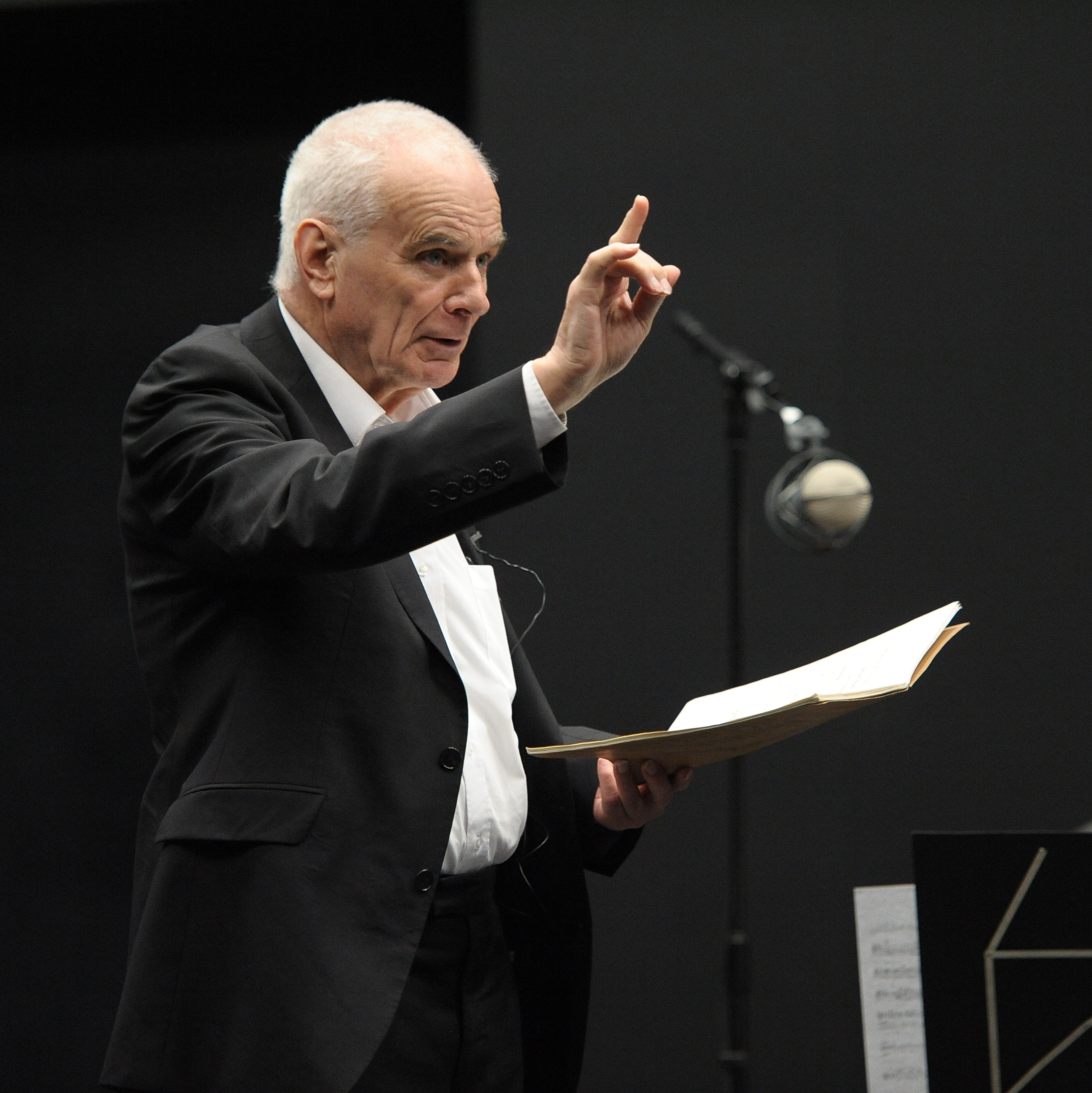
- The composer in 2012
- Composed: 1973–1976
- Dedication: William Glock
- Recorded: August 1978
- Movements: 4

Premiere
- Date: 2 February 1978
- Location: Royal Festival Hall, London
- Conductor: Simon Rattle
- Performers: Philharmonia Orchestra

The Symphony No. 1 by Peter Maxwell Davies was composed between 1973 and 1976, and is dedicated to Sir William Glock, "as a mark of friendship and of appreciation of his work for contemporary music in his years as music controller at the B.B.C.". It was commissioned by the Philharmonia Orchestra, which gave the premiere of the symphony at the Royal Festival Hall, London, on 2 February 1978, with 23-year-old Simon Rattle conducting.

== Character and materials ==
In his First Symphony, Davies addresses both the Beethoven model of the symphony and Sibelius's reinterpretation of it. Davies began work on what would become his First Symphony in 1973: a commission by the Philharmonia Orchestra intended to be performed the next year, resulting in a single-movement work of moderate length, provisionally titled Black Pentecost. However, the composer withdrew this score before it could be performed, feeling that it was not complete and needed to extend beyond the already-finished movement.

In order to increase his understanding of large-scale orchestral composition, Davies analysed a number of other composers' works, and cites Sibelius's Fifth Symphony, the opening of Schumann's Second Symphony, and the first movement, "Don", from Pierre Boulez's Pli selon pli as precedents for specific moments of the composition. As the work evolved, Davies came to the conviction that it "could mark the possibility of a beginning of an orchestral competence", and so decided to designate it a aymphony.

In the work, the pitches, note values, and longer time-spans are shaped and transformed by magic squares. Several plainsongs occur, and are transformed from one into another. The overall tonal centre is F, with a "modal dominant" of D♭.

== Instrumentation ==
The symphony is scored for piccolo (doubling alto flute), two flutes (second doubling second piccolo), two oboes, cor anglais, two clarinets, bass clarinet, two bassoons, double bassoon, four horns, three trumpets, three trombones, timpani, four percussionists (playing marimba, tubular bells, flexatone, glockenspiel, and crotales), harp, celesta, and strings.

== Analysis ==
The symphony is in four movements:

1. Presto – Allegro molto – Allegro sempre
2. Lento – Andante con moto – Allegro moderato – Allegro – Allegro vivo – Presto – Poco meno presto
3. Adagio – Più lento
4. Presto

After brass and pizzicato strings introduce the basic harmonies of the movement, the symphony proceeds as an allegro movement with "a ghost of a sonata form somewhere behind it", though there are no distinct first and second themes, and development is replaced by processes of transformation.

The second movement is a lento that turns into a scherzo, beginning with a statement of the plainsong Ave maris stella in the alto flute. It has D as its tonic, and a modal dominant of F♯.

The third movement is the slow movement proper, and has as its tonic the previous movement’s modal dominant, F♯, and the corresponding modal dominant A♯/B♭ and becomes an invocation of the "extraordinary, almost unearthly, treeless winter land and seascape of the Orkney island" where the composer lives.

The finale parallels the tonal shape of the first. It reaches a climax with an emergence of the "Ave maris stella" material in the form found in Davies's composition of the same title. The silences broken by jabbed chords at the end of the movement refers to the endings of the Fifth Symphonies of both Beethoven and Sibelius. The relationship to Beethoven is expressed exclusively in terms of rhythm.

== Discography ==
- Peter Maxwell Davies: Symphony. Philharmonia Orchestra, Simon Rattle (cond.). Recorded August 1978 in the Kingsway Hall, London. 12-inch LP recording. Headline. Decca HEAD 21. (TT: 54 min.) London: Decca, 1978. Reissued as part of Simon Rattle & Peter Maxwell Davies: Symphony No. 1; Points and Dances from Taverner. Points and Dances performed by The Fires of London, Peter Maxwell Davies (cond.). Twenty-fifth anniversary edition. CD recording. UCJ 473-721-2. (TT: 71:31). [England]: UCJ, 2003.
- Maxwell Davies: Symphony no. 1. BBC Philharmonic Orchestra, Sir Peter Maxwell Davies (cond.). Recorded by arrangement with BBC North at Studio 7, New Broadcasting House, Manchester, 8–9 December 1994. CD recording. Collins Classics 14352. (TT: 54:53). [England]: Lambourne Productions Limited, 1995. Reissued as part of Peter Maxwell Davies: Symphony No. 1 / Mavis in Las Vegas. CD recording. 8.572348. (TT: 68:03). Naxos Records, 2012.
