= Taverner (opera) =

Opera by Peter Maxwell Davies

- Opera by Peter Maxwell Davies
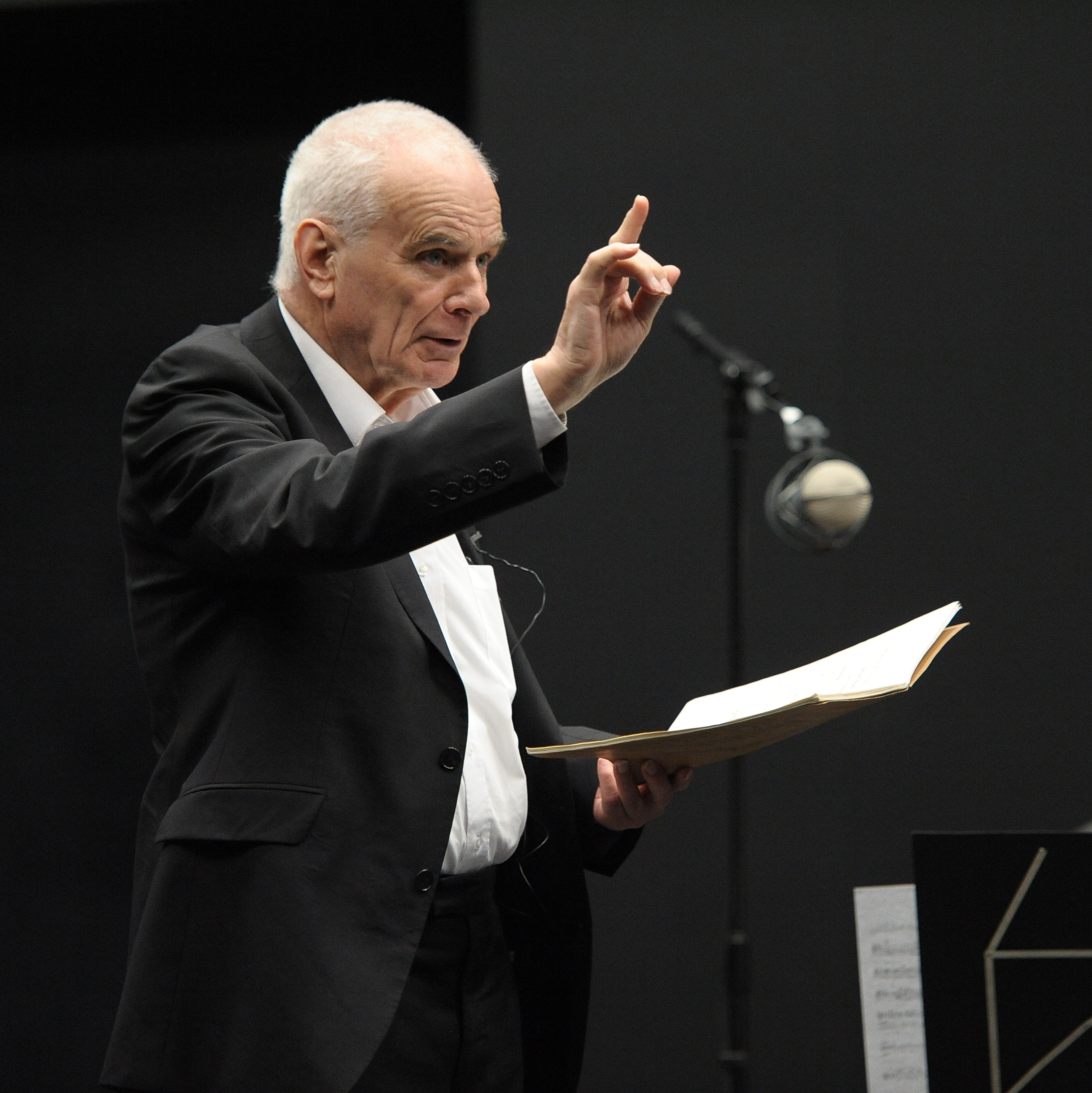
- The composer in 2012
- Librettist: Peter Maxwell Davies
- Premiere: 12 July 1972; Royal Opera House, London

Taverner is an opera with music and libretto by Peter Maxwell Davies. It is based on the life of the 16th-century English composer John Taverner, but in what Davies himself acknowledged was a non-realistic treatment. The gestation for the opera dated as far back as 1956 during Davies's years in Manchester, and continued when he went to Princeton University in 1962. Davies produced several instrumental works related to the opera during this gestation period, including the Points and Dances from 'Taverner' and the Second Fantasia on John Taverner's "In Nomine". Davies had completed the opera in 1968, but lost parts of the score in a fire at his Dorset cottage in 1969, which necessitated recomposition. Davies completed the opera in 1970.

Davies employs a theme from the 'Benedictus' of Taverner's Mass Gloria Tibi Trinitas as a recurring motif throughout the work. This theme, taken from the section beginning 'in nomine [Domini]', gained popularity among later composers of the English renaissance in the form of the instrumental In Nomine. Stephen Arnold has written a detailed analysis of the music of the opera and of Davies's use of parody. The American composer John Harbison has published an analysis of the opera (working from the vocal score), contemporary with its first performances. Gabriel Josipovici has commented on the historical events that inspired the opera and on the libretto itself.

== Instrumentation ==
In additional to regular symphony orchestra, Taverner calls for the following period instruments:

- Sopranino recorder
- Soprano recorder
- Alto recorder
- Tenor recorder
- Bass recorder
- 2 soprano shawms (or soprano Schreierpfeifen)
- Alto shawm (or alto Schreierpfeife)
- Bass shawm (or 2 serpents)
- Cornetto in C (or sopranino shawm)
- 2 "Bach" piccolo trumpets in F
- Alto trombone (or sackbut)
- Lute
- Positive organ
- Regal
- 2 treble viols
- 2 tenor viols
- 4 bass viols
- Violone
- Nakers (A, C)
- 12 soldiers' drums (tenor drum-style tabors)
- Side drum
- Handbells
- Small church bell (D just below the treble clef)
- Large church bell (B-flat, second line of the bass clef)

== Performance history ==
The opera was first performed at Covent Garden, London, on 12 July 1972, with Edward Downes conducting, Michael Geliot as director and Ralph Koltai as designer.

The U.S. premiere was in April 1985 at the Opera Company of Boston, under the direction of Sarah Caldwell.

== Roles ==
Roles, voice types, premiere cast
Role	Voice type	Premiere cast, 12 July 1972 Conductor: Edward Downes
Taverner	tenor	Ragnar Ulfung
Rose Parrowe	contralto	Gillian Knight
Death	bass	Benjamin Luxon
Abbot	bass-baritone	Raimund Herincx
King	bass	Noel Mangin
Cardinal	tenor	John Lanigan
Priest	countertenor	James Bowman
Choirboy	boy soprano	David Pearl

== Synopsis ==
=== Act 1 ===
Scene 1

Taverner is put on trial before the White Abbot on charges of heresy. Testimony comes from his father and his mistress, as well as a priest and a choirboy. Taverner is found guilty, but the Cardinal pardons him, noting the composer's usefulness and naiveté.

Scene 2

Taverner's fate is mirrored in the chorus of monks as he ponders his conscience.

Scene 3

The King (Note: Patently King Henry VIII, but not named as such in the libretto.) discusses his intended divorce with the Cardinal, (Note: Cardinal Wolsey, but again not identified as such in the libretto.) with interruptions from the jester.

Scene 4

The court jester proves to be Death in disguise. A metaphorical battle for Taverner's soul then occurs, with his father and mistress in opposition to the jester/Death. The jester/Death prevails, and Taverner has become a religious fanatic.

=== Act 2 ===
Scene 1

Taverner has become an instrument of royal religious policy, having abandoned his earlier Catholic faith for the new Protestant religion, in the wake of the Reformation. He presides over the conviction of the White Abbot on charges of heresy, with the same witnesses as in act 1, scene 1.

Scene 2

Discussion of the break with the Catholic Church and the founding of the Church of England takes place between the King, the Archbishop of Canterbury (formerly the Cardinal), (Note: Thomas Cranmer, played by the same soloist as Wolsey.) and the jester/Death. The King speaks of his plan to annex the monasteries.

Scene 3

The monks are at their devotions. Soldiers, under orders from Taverner, take the monks prisoner.

Scene 4 The people praise Taverner and his brutal methods of justice. The White Abbot goes to his execution, under escort from Taverner.

== Recordings ==
- NMC D157 (2 CDs). Cast includes Martyn Hill (John Taverner) and David Wilson-Johnson (Jester). BBC Symphony Orchestra, Fretwork, His Majesty's Sagbutts and Cornetts, and London Voices, conducted by Oliver Knussen. Taken from a 1996 BBC studio recording.
