= Peter Maxwell Davies =

English composer and conductor (1934–2016)

Sir Peter Maxwell Davies CH CBE
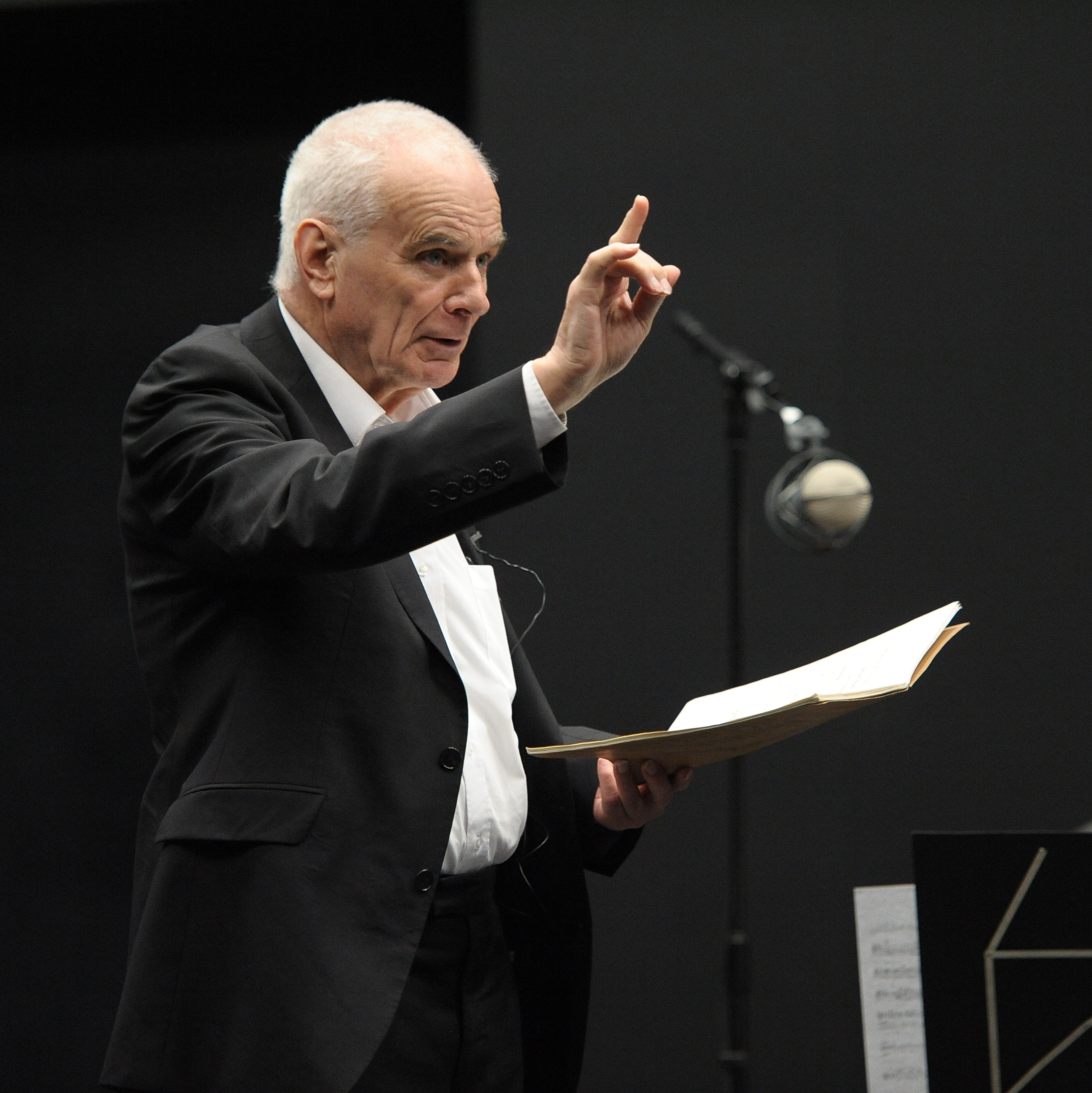
- Davies in 2012
- Born: 8 September 1934; Salford, Lancashire, England
- Died: 14 March 2016 (aged 81); Sanday, Orkney, Scotland
- Occupations: Composer; conductor
- Works: List of compositions

20th Master of the Queen's Music
- In office 2004–2014
- Monarch: Elizabeth II
- Preceded by: Malcolm Williamson
- Succeeded by: Judith Weir

Sir Peter Maxwell Davies CH CBE (8 September 1934 – 14 March 2016) was an English composer and conductor, who in 2004 was made Master of the Queen's Music.

As a student at both the University of Manchester and the Royal Manchester College of Music, Davies formed a group dedicated to contemporary music called the New Music Manchester with fellow students Harrison Birtwistle, Alexander Goehr, Elgar Howarth and John Ogdon. Davies's compositions include eight works for the stage—from the monodrama Eight Songs for a Mad King, which shocked the audience in 1969, to Kommilitonen!, first performed in 2011—and ten symphonies, written between 1973 and 2013.

As a conductor, Davies was artistic director of the Dartington International Summer School from 1979 to 1984 and associate conductor/composer with the Royal Philharmonic Orchestra from 1992 to 2002, holding the latter position with the BBC Philharmonic Orchestra as well.

== Early life and education ==
Davies was born in Holly Street, Langworthy, Salford, Lancashire, and lived in Trafford Road before moving to Wyville Drive in Swinton. He was the son of Thomas Davies, a manufacturer of optical instruments, and his wife Hilda, an amateur painter. At age four, after being taken to a performance of Gilbert and Sullivan's The Gondoliers, he told his parents that he was going to be a composer.

He took piano lessons and composed from an early age. As a 14-year-old, he submitted a composition called Blue Ice to the radio programme Children's Hour in Manchester. BBC producer Trevor Hill showed it to resident singer and entertainer Violet Carson, who said, "He's either quite brilliant or mad". Conductor Charles Groves nodded his approval and said, "I'd get him in". Davies's rise to fame began under the careful mentorship of Hill, who made him the programme's resident composer and introduced him to various professional musicians both in the UK and Germany.

After attending Leigh Boys Grammar School, Davies studied at the University of Manchester and at the Royal Manchester College of Music (amalgamated into the Royal Northern College of Music in 1973), where one of his teachers was Hedwig Stein; his fellow students included Harrison Birtwistle, Alexander Goehr, Elgar Howarth and John Ogdon. Together they formed New Music Manchester, a group committed to contemporary music. After graduating in 1956, he studied on an Italian government scholarship for a year with Goffredo Petrassi in Rome.

In 1959, Davies became Director of Music at Cirencester Grammar School. He left in 1962 after securing a Harkness Fellowship at Princeton University (with the help of Aaron Copland and Benjamin Britten); there he studied with Roger Sessions, Milton Babbitt and Earl Kim. He then moved to Australia, where he was Composer in Residence at the Elder Conservatorium of Music, University of Adelaide, 1965–66.

== Career ==
Davies was known as an enfant terrible of the 1960s, whose music frequently shocked audiences and critics. One of his overtly theatrical and shocking pieces was Eight Songs for a Mad King (1969), in which he used "musical parody" by taking a canonical piece of music – Handel's Messiah – and subverting it to explore the periods of madness of King George III.

In 1966 Davies returned to the United Kingdom and moved to the Orkney Islands, initially to Hoy in 1971, and later to Sanday. Orkney (particularly its capital, Kirkwall) hosts the St Magnus Festival, an arts festival founded by Davies in 1977. He frequently used the festival to premiere new works (often played by the local school orchestra).

Davies was artistic director of the Dartington International Summer School from 1979 to 1984. From 1992 to 2002 he was associate conductor/composer with the Royal Philharmonic Orchestra, a position he also held with the BBC Philharmonic Orchestra, and he has conducted a number of other prominent orchestras, including the Philharmonia, the Cleveland Orchestra, the Boston Symphony Orchestra and the Leipzig Gewandhaus Orchestra. In 2000 Davies was Artist in Residence at the Barossa Music Festival when he presented some of his music theatre works and worked with students from the Barossa Spring Academy. Davies was also Composer Laureate of the Scottish Chamber Orchestra, for whom he wrote a series of ten Strathclyde Concertos.

Davies was one of the first classical composers to open a music download website, MaxOpus (in 1996).

He was awarded a number of honorary doctorates, including Honorary Doctor of Music from Oxford University in July 2005. He had been President of Making Music (The National Federation of Music Societies) since 1989. Davies was made a Companion of the Order of the British Empire (CBE) in the 1981 Birthday Honours, and knighted in 1987. He was appointed Master of the Queen's Music in March 2004 but, in a break from the tradition of lifetime tenure, his appointment was limited to ten years. He was made a Freeman of the City of Salford August 2004. On 25 November 2006, he was appointed an Honorary Fellow of Canterbury Christ Church University at a service in Canterbury Cathedral. He was visiting professor of composition at the Royal Academy of Music, and in 2009 became an Honorary Fellow of Homerton College, Cambridge. Davies received an Honorary Doctorate from Heriot-Watt University in 2002

== Personal life ==
Davies was known by friends and colleagues as "Max", after his middle name "Maxwell", and was openly homosexual throughout his adult life.

Although he sometimes set sacred texts, Davies was an atheist.

In 2005 his house on Sanday was raided by police, who removed parts of a whooper swan (a protected species under the Wildlife and Countryside Act) which Davies had been planning to eat; he stated he had found the swan electrocuted beneath power lines.

In 2007, a controversy arose regarding an intended civil partnership with Davies's partner of five years, builder Colin Parkinson. They were told that the ceremony could not take place on the Sanday Light Railway. The couple later abandoned their plans but remained together until a break-up in 2012.

The same year, the composer's MaxOpus site became temporarily unavailable after the arrest in June 2007 of Michael Arnold (one of MaxOpus's directors) on fraud charges arising from money missing from Davies's business accounts. In October 2008 Arnold and his wife Judith (Davies's former agent) were charged with the theft of almost £450,000. In November 2009, Michael Arnold was sentenced to 18 months in jail on a charge of false accounting. Charges of stealing against the couple, to which both had pleaded not guilty, were dropped when the prosecution offered no evidence. MaxOpus was relaunched earlier in 2009.

Davies was appointed Member of the Order of the Companions of Honour (CH) in the 2014 New Year Honours for "services to music". He died from leukaemia on 14 March 2016, aged 81, at his home in Orkney.

== Political views ==
Davies was a life-long supporter of gay rights and a vice-president of the Campaign for Homosexual Equality.

Davies had a keen interest in environmentalism. He wrote The Yellow Cake Revue, a collection of cabaret-style pieces that he performed with actress Eleanor Bron, in protest at plans to mine uranium ore in Orkney. It is from this suite of pieces that his famous instrumental chanson triste interlude Farewell to Stromness is taken. The slow, walking bass line that pervades the Farewell portrays the residents of the town of Stromness having to leave their homes as a result of uranium contamination. The Revue was first performed at the St Magnus Festival, in Orkney, by Bron, with the composer at the piano, in June 1980. Stromness, the second largest town in Orkney, would have been two miles (three kilometres) from the uranium mine's core, and the centre most threatened by pollution, had the proposed development been approved.

In the run-up to the Iraq War in 2003 he marched in protest, and he was an outspoken critic of the Labour governments of both Tony Blair and Gordon Brown.

Davies's appointment to the post of Master of the Queen's Music was initially controversial, as he had expressed republican views. However, he confirmed in 2010 that contact with the Queen had converted him to monarchism. He told The Daily Telegraph, "I have come to realise that there is a lot to be said for the monarchy. It represents continuity, tradition and stability."

He was a member of the British Academy of Songwriters, Composers and Authors (BASCA) and the Incorporated Society of Musicians.

== Music ==
Davies was a prolific composer who wrote in a variety of styles and idioms over his career, often combining disparate styles in one piece. Early works include the Trumpet Sonata (1955), written while he was at college, and his first orchestral work, Prolation (1958), written while under the tutelage of Petrassi. Early works often use serial techniques (for example Sinfonia for chamber orchestra, 1962), sometimes combined with Mediaeval and Renaissance compositional methods. Fragments of plainsong are often used as basic source material to be adapted and developed. His "O Magnum Mysterium" (1960) features on several YouTube clips, and was, for some time, his most talked-about work.

Pieces from the late 1960s take up these techniques and tend towards the experimental and to have a violent character. These include Revelation and Fall (based on a poem by Georg Trakl), the music theatre pieces Eight Songs for a Mad King and Vesalii Icones, and the opera Taverner. Taverner, again, shows an interest in Renaissance music, taking as its subject the composer John Taverner, and consisting of parts resembling Renaissance forms. The orchestral piece St Thomas Wake (1969) shows this interest and is a particularly obvious example of Davies's polystylism. It combines a suite of foxtrots (played by a twenties-style dance band), a pavane by John Bull and Davies's "own" music (the work is described by Davies as a "Foxtrot for orchestra on a pavan by John Bull"). Many works from this period were performed by the Pierrot Players, which Davies founded with Harrison Birtwistle in 1967; they were reformed as the Fires of London in 1970, then disbanded in 1987.

After his move to Orkney, Davies often drew on Orcadian or more generally Scottish themes in his music, and has sometimes set the words of Orcadian writer George Mackay Brown. He has written a number of other operas, including The Martyrdom of St Magnus (1976), The Lighthouse (1980, his most popular opera), and The Doctor of Myddfai (1996). The ambitious, nihilistic parable Resurrection (1987), which includes parts for a rock band, was nearly twenty years in gestation.

Davies was interested in classical forms, completing his first symphony in 1976. He wrote ten numbered symphonies – a symphonic cycle of the Symphonies Nos.1–7 (1976–2000), a Symphony No. 8 titled the Antarctic (2000), a Ninth Symphony (premiered on 9 June 2012 by the Royal Liverpool Symphony Orchestra), a Tenth Symphony (see below), a Sinfonia Concertante (1982), as well as the series of ten Strathclyde Concertos for various instruments (pieces born out of his association with the Scottish Chamber Orchestra, 1987–1996). In 2002, he began work on a series of string quartets for the Maggini String Quartet to record on Naxos Records (the Naxos Quartets). The whole series was completed in 2007, and was viewed by the composer as a "novel in ten chapters".

Davies's lighter orchestral works have included Mavis in Las Vegas (a title inspired by a Las Vegas hotelier's mishearing of "Maxwell Davies" and registering him as "Mavis") and An Orkney Wedding, with Sunrise (which features the bagpipes), as well as a number of theatre pieces for children and a good deal of music with educational purposes. Additionally he wrote the scores for Ken Russell's films The Devils and The Boy Friend. His Violin Concerto No. 2 received its UK premiere on 8 September 2009 (the composer's 75th birthday) in the Royal Albert Hall, London, as part of the 2009 season of The Proms.

On 13 October 2009, his string sextet The Last Island was first performed by the Nash Ensemble at Wigmore Hall in a 75th birthday concert for the composer. His Symphony No. 10 had its world premiere at the Barbican Hall, London on 2 February 2014.

Throstle's Nest Junction, opus 181 (1996), and A Spell for Green Corn – The MacDonald Dances both had their London premiere at the BBC's Maida Vale studios, broadcast live on Radio 3 with the composer's participation on 19 June 2014, in celebration of his 80th birthday. The music was played by the BBC Symphony Orchestra, and presented by Petroc Trelawny.

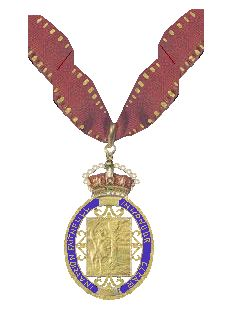
Insignia of C.H.

- The last months of his life, as he struggled with terminal illness, showed continuing creative power and energy. There was The Hogboon (op. 335, a children's opera), the epiphany carol A Torrent of Gold, and the short choral work The Golden Solstice. He was working on a String Quartet (op.338) at the time of his death; only the first movement was completed.

=== Career highlights ===
- 1953–58 – studied in Manchester and Rome.
- 1967 – together with Harrison Birtwistle, founded the contemporary music touring ensemble the Pierrot Players (later renamed The Fires of London).
- 1971 – moved to Hoy in the Orkney Islands.
- 1977 – founded the St Magnus Festival.
- 1987 – knighted.
- 1987–96 – wrote the ten Strathclyde Concertos for the Scottish Chamber Orchestra.
- 2001–07 – wrote a cycle of ten string quartets, commissioned by Naxos.
- 2004 – appointed Master of the Queen's Music.
- 2005 – the Honorary Doctorate of Music conferred by the University of Oxford.
- 2008 – became Patron of the Manchester University Music Society (MUMS).
- 2009 – became an Honorary Fellow of Homerton College, Cambridge.
- 2014 – appointed to the Order of Companions of Honour.
- 2015 – awarded the Gold Medal of the Royal Philharmonic Society.

== Selected compositions ==
- First Taverner Fantasia (1962)
- Second Taverner Fantasia (1964)
- Revelation and Fall (1966)
- Worldes Blis (1966–69)
- St Thomas Wake (1969)
- Eight Songs for a Mad King (1968; for singer/narrator/actor and chamber ensemble)
- Missa super l'homme armé (1968, rev. 1971; for male or female speaker or singer and ensemble)
- Stone Litany (1973)
- Ave Maris Stella (1975; chamber ensemble)
- The Door of the Sun for Viola Solo, J.132 (1975)
- Symphony No. 1 (1973–76; orchestra)
- The Martyrdom of St Magnus (1977; chamber opera)
- The Lighthouse (1979; chamber opera)
- Black Pentecost (1979; for mezzo-soprano, baritone, & orchestra)
- Cinderella (1980; children's opera)
- Symphony No. 2 (1980)
- The Yellow Cake Revue (1980), including Farewell to Stromness
- Image, Reflection, Shadow (1982; ensemble)
- Symphony No. 3 (1984)
- An Orkney Wedding, with Sunrise (1985; orchestra)
- Concerto for Violin and Orchestra (1985; dedicated to Isaac Stern who gave the first performance on 21 June 1986 at the St. Magnus Festival in the Orkney Islands)
- Concerto for Trumpet and Orchestra (1988)
- Symphony No. 4 (1989)
- Caroline Mathilde (1991; ballet)
- Strathclyde Concerto No. 3 for horn, trumpet, and symphony orchestra, (German Premiere: Markus Wittgens, horn / Otto Sauter, trumpet / Philharmonisches Staatsorchester Bremen / Conductor: Peter Maxwell Davies – Bremen) (1994)
- Strathclyde Concerto No. 5 for violin, viola, and string orchestra, J.245 (1991)
- A Spell for Green Corn: The MacDonald Dances (1993; violin, orchestra)
- Symphony No. 5 (1994)
- The Doctor of Myddfai (1996; opera)
- Symphony No. 6 (1996)
- Concerto for Piccolo and Orchestra (1996, opus 182)
- Job (1997; singers, orchestra)
- Mr Emmet Takes a Walk (2000; chamber opera)
- Symphony No. 7 (2000)
- Symphony No. 8 (Antarctic Symphony) (2001)
- Naxos Quartets (2001–2007; string quartet)
- Homerton (2010; for the choir of Homerton College, Cambridge)
- Kommilitonen! (2011; opera)
- Symphony No. 9 (2012)
- Symphony No. 10 (Alla ricerca di Borromini) (2013)

== Recordings ==
- Naxos Quartets – Maggini Quartet – Naxos 5-CD set 8.505225
- Mass; Missa parvula; two organ pieces; two motets – Hyperion CDA67454
- Magnificat and Nunc Dimittis and O Sacrum Convivium – Delphian DCD34037
- Symphonies 1–6 – BBC Philharmonic, Scottish Chamber Orchestra, Philharmonia, Royal Philharmonic / composer – Collins Classics
- Ave Maris Stella; Image, Reflection, Shadow; Runes from a Holy Island – Fires of London / composer – Unicorn-Kanchana

Court offices
Preceded by Malcolm Williamson	Master of the Queen's Music; 2004–2014	Succeeded by Judith Weir
