= List of compositions by Harrison Birtwistle =

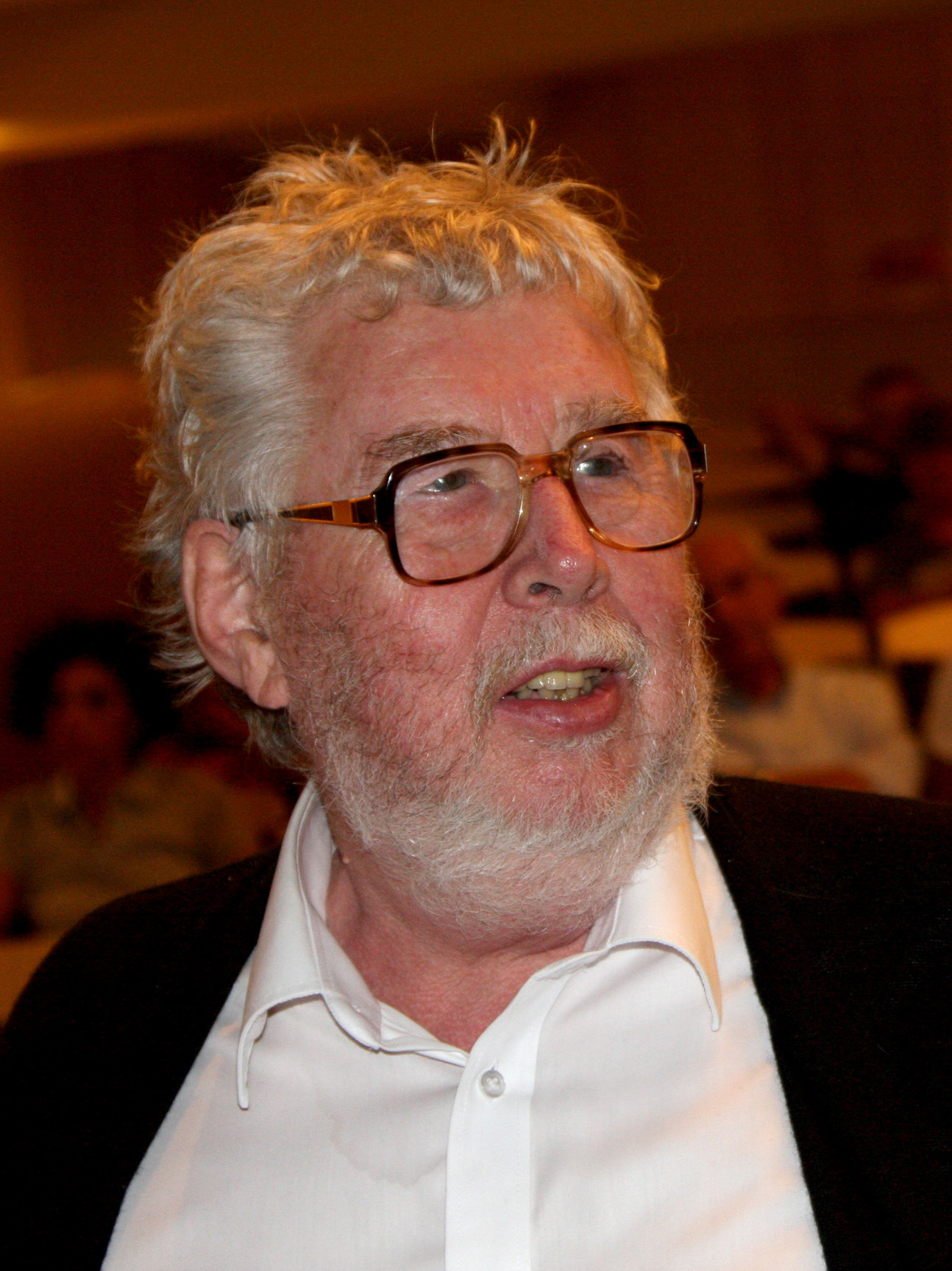
Harrison Birtwistle in 2008

This is a list of compositions by Harrison Birtwistle (1934–2022), a British composer of contemporary classical music. Birtwistle's music was published by Universal Edition until 1994, and since then by Boosey & Hawkes.

== Opera and other dramatised works ==
- The Mark of the Goat, children's dramatic cantata for actors, singers, 2 choirs, 3 melody instruments, piano (6 hands), large and small percussion ensembles (1965)
- Punch and Judy, A tragical comedy or comical tragedy in 1 act (1966–67)
- Down by the Greenwood Side, A Dramatic Pastoral (1968–69)
- Pulse Field: Frames, Pulse and Interruptions, ballet, for 6 dancers and 9 musicians (1977)
- Bow Down, music theatre, for 5 actors and 4 musicians (1977)
- The Mask of Orpheus, Lyric Tragedy in 3 acts (1973–83)
- Yan Tan Tethera, A Mechanical Pastoral (1983-84)
- Gawain, Opera in 2 acts, (1990–91, revised 1994 & 1999)
- The Second Mrs Kong, Opera in 2 acts (1993–94)
- The Last Supper, Opera in 1 act (1998–99)
- The Io Passion, Chamber Opera (2003)
- The Minotaur, Opera (2005–07)
- The Corridor, Scena for two voices and ensemble (2008–09)
- The Cure, for two singers and ensemble (2014–15)

== Orchestra ==
- Chorales, for orchestra (1960–63)
- Nomos, for 4 amplified instruments and orchestra (1967–68)
- The Triumph of Time, for orchestra (1971–72)
- Melencolia I, for clarinet, harp and 2 string orchestras (1976)
- Earth Dances, for orchestra (1985–86)
- Endless Parade, for trumpet, strings and vibraphone (1986–87)
- Machaut à ma manière, for orchestra (1988)
- Gawain's Journey, for orchestra (1991)
- Antiphonies, for piano and orchestra (1992)
- The Cry of Anubis, for tuba and orchestra (1994)
- Panic, for alto saxophone, jazz drummer, wind, brass and percussion (1995)
- Exody, for orchestra (1997)
- Sonance Severance 2000, for orchestra (1999)
- The Shadow of Night, for orchestra (2001)
- Night’s Black Bird, for orchestra (2004)
- Concerto for Violin and Orchestra (2009–10)
- Responses, for piano and orchestra (2013-14)
- Deep Time, for orchestra (2016)
- Variation IX in Pictured Within: Birthday Variations for M.C.B., for orchestra (2019)

== Chamber ensemble without voices ==
- The World is Discovered, 6 Instrumental Movements after Heinrich Isaac, for chamber ensemble (1961)
- 3 Movements with Fanfares, for chamber orchestra (1964)
- Tragoedia, for flute, oboe, clarinet, bassoon, horn, harp and string quartet (1965)
- Chorale from a Toy Shop, open scoring (1967, later versions 2016-17)
- Three lessons in a frame, for piano solo, flute, clarinet, violin, cello and percussion. (1967: withdrawn)
- Medusa, for flute, clarinet, violin, cello, piano, percussion and electronics (1969: withdrawn)
- Verses for Ensembles, for 3 instrumental ensembles (1968–69)
- Some Petals from my Twickenham Herbarium, for piccolo, clarinet in Bb, glockenspiel, piano, violin and violoncello (1969)
- An Imaginary Landscape, for brass, percussion and double basses (1971)
- Tombeau in memoriam Igor Stravinsky, for flute, clarinet, harp and string quartet (1971)
- Grimethorpe Aria, for brass band (1973)
- For O, for O, the Hobby-Horse is Forgot, Ceremony, for 6 percussionists (1976)
- Silbury Air, for chamber ensemble (1977)
- Carmen Arcadiae Mechanicae Perpetuum, for chamber ensemble or orchestra (1977–78)
- Mercure: Poses Plastiques (after Erik Satie), arranged for 14 players (1980)
- Still Movement, for 13 solo strings (1984)
- Secret Theatre, for chamber ensemble (flute doubling piccolo, oboe, B♭ clarinet, bassoon doubling contrabassoon, horn, C trumpet doubling B♭ piccolo trumpet, trombone, percussion, piano, 2 violins, viola, cello, and double bass) (1984)
- Fanfare for Will, for brass ensemble (1987: unpublished)
- Salford Toccata, for brass band (1989)
- Ritual Fragment, for chamber orchestra (1990)
- Fanfare for Glyndebourne, for brass ensemble and timpani (1994)
- Bach Measures, for chamber ensemble (1996)
- Slow Frieze, for piano and ensemble (1996)
- Placid Mobile, for 36 trumpets (1998)
- The Silk House Tattoo, for two trumpets and side drums (1998)
- Sonance 2000, for brass ensemble (1999)
- 17 Tate Riffs, for ensemble (2000)
- Fanfare, for brass and percussion (2001)
- Tenebrae David, for brass ensemble (2001)
- Theseus Game, for large ensemble with two conductors (2002)
- Cantus Iambeus, for thirteen instruments (2004)
- The Io Passion: Nocturnes, for clarinet and string quartet (2004)
- Cortege, for 14 musicians (2007: a reworking of Ritual Fragment)
- Virelai (Sus une fontayne) (after Johannes Ciconia), for 12 players (2008)
- Crescent Moon over the Irrational, for flute doubling piccolo, clarinet, harp and string quartet (2010)
- Fantasia upon all the notes for flute, clarinet, harp and string quartet, (2011)
- In Broken Images, for woodwind, brass and percussion (2011-12)
- Five Lessons in a Frame, for ensemble (2015: the 5 Duets, framed by a new chorale)
- Sonance for a New Space, for 3 trumpets, 4 trombones and bells (2018)
- Donum Simoni MMXVIII (2018) for woodwind, brass and percussion

== Instrumental groups of 5 or fewer performers, without voices ==
- Refrains and Choruses, for wind quintet (1957)
- Précis, for piano (1960)
- Verses, for clarinet and piano (1965)
- Linoi, for basset clarinet in A and piano, or clarinet, piano, tape and dancer; or clarinet, piano and cello (1968)
- Four Interludes for a Tragedy, for basset clarinet and tape (1968)
- Ut Heremita Solus (after Ockeghem), for flute, clarinet, violin, cello, piano and glockenspiel (1969)
- Hoquetus David (after Machaut), for flute, clarinet, violin, cello, piano and glockenspiel (1969)
- 8 Lessons for Keyboards (1969: unpublished)
- Signals, for clarinet and tape (1970: unpublished)
- Dinah and Nick's Love Song, for 3 melody instruments and harp (1970)
- Sad Song, for piano (1971)
- Chanson de Geste, for amplified sustaining instrument and tape (1973: withdrawn)
- Clarinet Quintet, for clarinet and string quartet (1980)
- Pulse Sampler, for oboe and claves (1981)
- Duets for Storab, for 2 flutes (1983)
- Berceuse de Jeanne, for piano (1984)
- Antiphonies from the Moonkeeper, for trumpet (1985)
- Hector's Dawn, for piano (1987)
- An Interrupted Endless Melody, for oboe and piano (1991)
- 5 Distances for 5 Instruments, for flute, oboe, clarinet in B♭, bassoon and horn in F (1992)
- Hoquetus Petrus, for two flutes and piccolo trumpet (1995)
- 9 Movements, for string quartet (1991–96)
- Harrison’s Clocks, for piano (1997–98)
- The Silk House Tattoo, for two trumpets and 3 side drums (1998)
- Betty Freeman: Her Tango, for piano (2000)
- Ostinato with Melody, for piano (2000)
- The Axe Manual, for piano and percussion (2000)
- Saraband: The King's Farewell, for piano (2001)
- Crowd, for solo harp (2005)
- The Io Passion - Aubades and Nocturnes, for basset clarinet and string quartet (2006)
- Dance of the metro-gnome, for piano (2006)
- Five Little Antiphonies for Amelia, for two trumpets (2006)
- Double Hocket, for piano trio (2007)
- The Tree of Strings, for string quartet (2007)
- 3 Fugues from The Art of Fugue (after Bach), for string quartet (2008)
- The Message (Duet 1), for E♭ clarinet, trumpet in C and military drum (2008)
- Bourdon (Duet 2), for violin and viola (2009)
- Roddy's Reel, for bass clarinet with audience participation (2009)
- Oboe Quartet (2009–10)
- Duet 3, for cor anglais and bassoon (2010)
- Trio, for violin, cello and piano (2010)
- Gigue Machine, for piano (2011)
- Beyond the White Hand, for guitar (2013)
- Variations from the Golden Mountain, for piano (2014)
- Duet 4, for violin and flute (2014)
- Duet 5, for horn and trombone (2014)
- Hoquetus Irvineus, for string quartet (2014)
- The Silk House Sequences, for string quartet (2015)
- Intrada, for piano and percussion (2017)
- Keyboard Engine, for two pianos (2017-18)
- Duet for Eight Strings, for viola and cello (2018)

== Vocal music (with and without instruments) ==
- Monody for Corpus Christi, for soprano, flute, violin and horn (1959)
- Narration: A Description of the Passing of a Year, for a cappella chorus (1963)
- Music for Sleep, for children's voices, piano and percussion (1963)
- Entr'actes and Sappho Fragments, for soprano and instruments (1964)
- Ring a Dumb Carillon, for soprano (+ suspended cymbals), clarinet in B♭ and percussion (1964–65)
- Carmen Paschale, motet for choir and organ (1965)
- The Visions of Francesco Petrarca (1965-66: withdrawn)
- Monodrama (1967)
- Cantata, for soprano and instruments (1969)
- Nenia: The Death of Orpheus, for soprano, 3 bass clarinets, crotales and piano (1970)
- Meridian, for mezzosoprano, 2 three-part women's choirs and instruments (1970–71)
- Prologue, for tenor and 7 instruments (1971)
- The Fields of Sorrow, for 2 sopranos, 8-part choir and instruments (1972)
- Epilogue, "Full fathom five", for baritone, horn, 4 trombones and 6 tam-tams (1972)
- La Plage: 8 Arias of Remembrance, for soprano and 5 instruments (1972)
- Five Chorale Preludes (after J.S. Bach), for soprano, clarinet, basset horn and bass clarinet (1975)
- … agm …, for 16 voices and 3 instrumental ensembles (1978–79)
- On the Sheer Threshold of the Night, Madrigal, for 4 soloists and 12-voice choir (1980)
- Deowa, for soprano and clarinet in B♭ (1983)
- Songs by Myself, for soprano and chamber ensemble (1984)
- Words Overheard, for soprano and chamber orchestra (1985)
- 4 Songs of Autumn, for soprano and string quartet (1988)
- An die Musik, for soprano and chamber ensemble (1988)
- The Wine Merchant Robin of Mere, for male voice and piano (1989)
- 4 Poems by Jaan Kaplinski, for soprano and 13 instruments (1991)
- 9 Settings of Celan (may be performed as a set or individually) for soprano, 2 clarinets, viola, cello and double bass (1989–96)
- Pulse Shadows (the 9 Movements for string quartet interleaved with the 9 Settings of Celan) (1989–96)
- The Woman and the Hare, for soprano, reciter and ensemble (1998)
- Love Cries, from the opera The Second Mrs. Kong, for soprano, mezzo-soprano, tenor and orchestra (1999)
- Three Latin Motets, from The Last Supper, for unaccompanied choir (1999)
- 9 Settings of Lorine Niedecker, for soprano and cello (1998–2000)
- The Sadness of Komachi, for tenor and prepared piano (2000)
- The Ring Dance of the Nazarene, for baritone, tombak, choir and ensemble (2003)
- The Gleam, for unaccompanied choir (2003)
- 3 Brendel Settings, for baritone and orchestra (2000–04)
- 3 Arias by Bach, for soprano, countertenor and chamber ensemble (2003–04)
- 26 Orpheus Elegies, for oboe, harp and countertenor (2003–04)
- Today Too, for tenor, flute and guitar (2004)
- Neruda Madrigales, for chorus and ensemble with live electronics (2004–05)
- The Mouse Felt…, for baritone and piano (2005)
- Lullaby, for two sopranos, unaccompanied (2006)
- Song of Myself, for baritone, double bass and percussion (2006)
- Bogenstrich for baritone, cello and piano (2006-09)
- Angel Fighter, for chamber chorus, tenor, countertenor and ensemble (2009)
- From Vanitas, for tenor and piano (2009)
- Semper Dowland, semper dolens (after Dowland), for tenor and ensemble (2009)
- 3 Settings of Lorine Niedecker, for soprano and cello (2011)
- The Moth Requiem, for twelve female voices, three harps and alto flute (2012)
- Songs from the Same Earth, for tenor and piano (2012-13)
- Chorale-Prelude, for SATB chorus a capella (2014)
- Three Songs from The Holy Forest, for soprano and ensemble (2016-17)
- ...when falling asleep, for soprano, speaker and ensemble (2019)

== Electronic music ==
- Chronometer, for 2 asynchronous 4-track tapes (1971–72)

== Incidental music for theatre ==
=== National Theatre productions ===
- Hamlet (1975)
- Tamburlaine the Great (1976)
- Julius Caesar (1977)
- Volpone (1977)
- The Country Wife (1977)
- The Cherry Orchard (1978: with Dominic Muldowney)
- Brand (1978)
- The Double Dealer (1978)
- Herod (1978: with Dominic Muldowney)
- As You Like It (1979)
- The Oresteia (1981)
- The Trojan War Will Not Take Place (1983)
- Coriolanus (1984)
- The Tempest (1988)
- The Winter's Tale (1988)
- Cymbeline (1988)
- Bacchai (2002)

=== Other ===
- The Innocents (play by William Archibald) (1976)

== Film scores ==
- The Offence (1972)
