= Birtwistle =

Birtwistle is a surname. Notable people with that surname or similar surnames include:

- Adam Birtwistle (born 1959), British artist
- Alexander Birtwistle (born 1948), retired British Army officer
- Archibald Cull Birtwistle (1927–2009), retired British Army officer
- Bill Birtwistle (born 1939), New Zealand rugby union player
- Deon Birtwistle (born 1980), Australian rower
- Gordon Birtwistle (born 1943), British Liberal Democrat politician
- Harrison Birtwistle (1934–2022), British contemporary composer
- Harry Birtwistle (born 2003), Singaporean footballer
- Iris Birtwistle (1918–2006), English poet and gallery owner
- Margaret Birtwistle (1925–1992), British track and field athlete
- Mark Birtwistle (born 1962), New Zealand rugby union player
- Silas Birtwistle (born 1963), British artist and sculptor
- Sue Birtwistle (born 1945), producer and writer of television drama
- Thomas Birtwistle (1833–1912), English trade unionist and factory inspector

== See also ==
- Birtwisle, surname
- Birtwhistle, surname
- Eva Birthistle (born 1974), Irish actress and writer
