= Stephen Langridge =

British stage and opera director

Stephen Langridge is a British stage and opera director. From 2012 to 2019 he was Director of the Gothenburg Opera. He is the current artistic director of the Glyndebourne Festival. He has also staged works for several prominent opera houses and festivals internationally, including the Royal Opera House in London, the Lyric Opera of Chicago, the Nederlandse Reisopera, the Salzburg Festival, and the Staatsoper Hannover among others.

== Career ==
The son of tenor Philip Langridge, Langridge studied singing and the French horn in his youth. He earned a diploma in drama from Exeter University.

In 2004 Langridge directed the world premiere of Harrison Birtwistle's The Io Passion at the Aldeburgh Festival and in 2007 he directed Gluck's Orfeo ed Euridice for Opera Atelier. In 2008 he directed the world premiere of Birtwistle's The Minotaur at the Royal Opera House in London. The premiere cast featured his father. The New York Times described the production as "a masterful retelling of a classic Greek myth" and wrote that Langridge was "a talent to be reckoned with." Other works he has directed at Covent Garden include Birtwhistle's Gawain in 2000 and Wagner's Parsifal in 2013.

In 2012 Langridge was appointed artistic director of the Gothenburg opera house, a post he remained in until the end of the 2018–2019 season. At that theater he directed Mozart's The Marriage of Figaro in 2014, produced the world premiere production of Hans Gefors's Notorious in 2015, directed productions of Wagner's The Ring Cycle and Ambroise Thomas's Hamlet in 2016, and directed Strauss's Elektra in 2017. In 2018 he was appointed director of the Glyndebourne Festival Opera at Glyndebourne, an English country house near Lewes, in East Sussex, England which is home to the third largest opera company in the United Kingdom.

Langridge has also directed Donizetti's Maria Stuarda at Grange Park Opera in 2005; Strauss's Salome for the Malmö Opera in 2007;Verdi's Otello for the Salzburg Festival in 2008; Verdi's Rigoletto at the Volksoper Wien and Rameau's Hippolyte et Aricie in 2009 at the Nationale Reisopera; the world premiere of Klaas de Vries's Wake at the Nationale Reisopera in 2010; Berlioz's La damnation de Faust at the Lyric Opera of Chicago, Puccini's La bohème at the Nederlandse Reisopera, and Verdi's Don Carlo at the Teatro Nacional de São Carlos in 2011; Lohengrin at the Royal Swedish Opera in 2012; Bellini's I Puritani for Grange Park Opera in 2013; Handel's Theodora at the Théâtre des Champs-Elysées in 2015; Bizet's Carmen at the Greek National Opera and Puccini's Madama Butterfly at the Norwegian National Opera and Ballet in 2016; and Wagner's Tristan und Isolde at the Staatsoper Hannover in 2017.
