= Elizabeth Atherton =

British lyric soprano

Elizabeth Atherton is a British lyric soprano. Born and brought up in London, she is the daughter of conductor David Atherton. She studied at Trinity College, Cambridge and at the Royal Scottish Academy of Music and Drama with Patricia MacMahon. She is a winner of the Maggie Teyte Prize and the Handel Singing Competition.

Atherton is known for her versatility across a broad spectrum of music and her natural presence on stage. She first came to press attention whilst still at college with a Park Lane Group recital at the Purcell Room in 2002. The Times noted, "her voice is already formidable. Each note is hit dead in the centre; the tone is warm, the projection vast... there’s a dramatic actress in chrysalis here".

On leaving college, she made her professional debut with English Touring Opera as Helena in Britten's Midsummer Night's Dream and was then immediately contracted to Welsh National Opera, where her roles included Mozart's Pamina, Donna Elvira and Countess. Richard Morrision in The Times wrote, "Elizabeth Atherton's Countess is radiantly sung, especially her gorgeously poised Porgi amor."

Operatic appearances since have included many roles with Opera North, including Fiordiligi, Michaela, Governess, Donna Elvira and Helena, appearances at the Aldeburgh, Southbank, Holland, Bregenz, Grange Park and Buxton Festivals and her return to WNO for Moses und Aron.

Atherton has a close relationship with Sir Harrison Birtwistle who has written two chamber operas for her and the British tenor Mark Padmore. The first of these, The Corridor, was premiered in 2009 at the Aldeburgh Festival to considerable critical acclaim. The Independent described it as "Startling, inventive and compelling, the soprano Elizabeth Atherton inhabits the role of Eurydice with an assuredness that suggests a deep understanding of the part."

Birtwistle's second opera for Atherton and Padmore, always intended to go alongside The Corridor as the second half of a double-bill, was The Cure, which opened the 2015 Aldeburgh Festival and as a co-production with the Royal Opera House then transferred to their Linbury Studio for further performances. Both performers received rave reviews internationally. Andrew Clements in The Guardian wrote, "[T]he two singers are exceptional. Elizabeth Atherton... sings both roles consummately." The New York Times wrote, "Atherton sings her roles with abandon: knowing and sarcastic as Woman; distant and lonely as Eurydice [in Harrison Birtwistle's The Corridor]; a Kundry and a Salome compressed in a caldron of erotic enchantment as Medea [in Birtwistle's The Cure]." According to the "Financial Times, Atherton's "singing finds a glinting radiance in both pieces" while the London Evening Standard reported that the singers were "in blazing form, every note wrenched from their bodies with intensity".

Atherton is a busy concert artist, regularly working with symphony orchestras in Britain, Europe and internationally, including appearances with the Orchestre de Paris, London Symphony Orchestra, Ulster Orchestra, Philharmonia, Stavanger Symphony, BBC Symphony Orchestra, Orchestra Sinfonica di Milano Giuseppe Verdi, Royal Scottish National Orchestra, Hong Kong Philharmonic, City of Birmingham Symphony Orchestra and frequent engagements with the BBC National Orchestra of Wales. Conductors she has collaborated with include Sir Charles Mackerras, Pierre Boulez, Sir Richard Hickox, Sir Andrew Davis, Thierry Fischer, Harry Christophers, Carlo Rizzi, Richard Farnes, Sir Antonio Pappano, Laurence Cummings, Sir Neville Marriner and Martyn Brabbins.

Atherton is also a recitalist, having appeared at Wigmore Hall, Kings Place, Royal Opera House, St. David's Hall Cardiff, Purcell Room and Leeds Lieder+. She has recorded recital discs with Malcolm Martineau and Iain Burnside and her interpretation of Britten's song cycle On This Island received the following review: "Atherton’s voice is now not just a lush instrument but a superbly communicative one: she caught exactly the subtle moods – bittersweet, ironic or heartfelt – of Auden’s words and Britten’s early unfettered lyricism."

Atherton married in 2007 and lives with her husband and two sons.
