= The Triumph of Time (Birtwistle) =

Orchestral composition by Harrison Birtwistle

- by Harrison Birtwistle
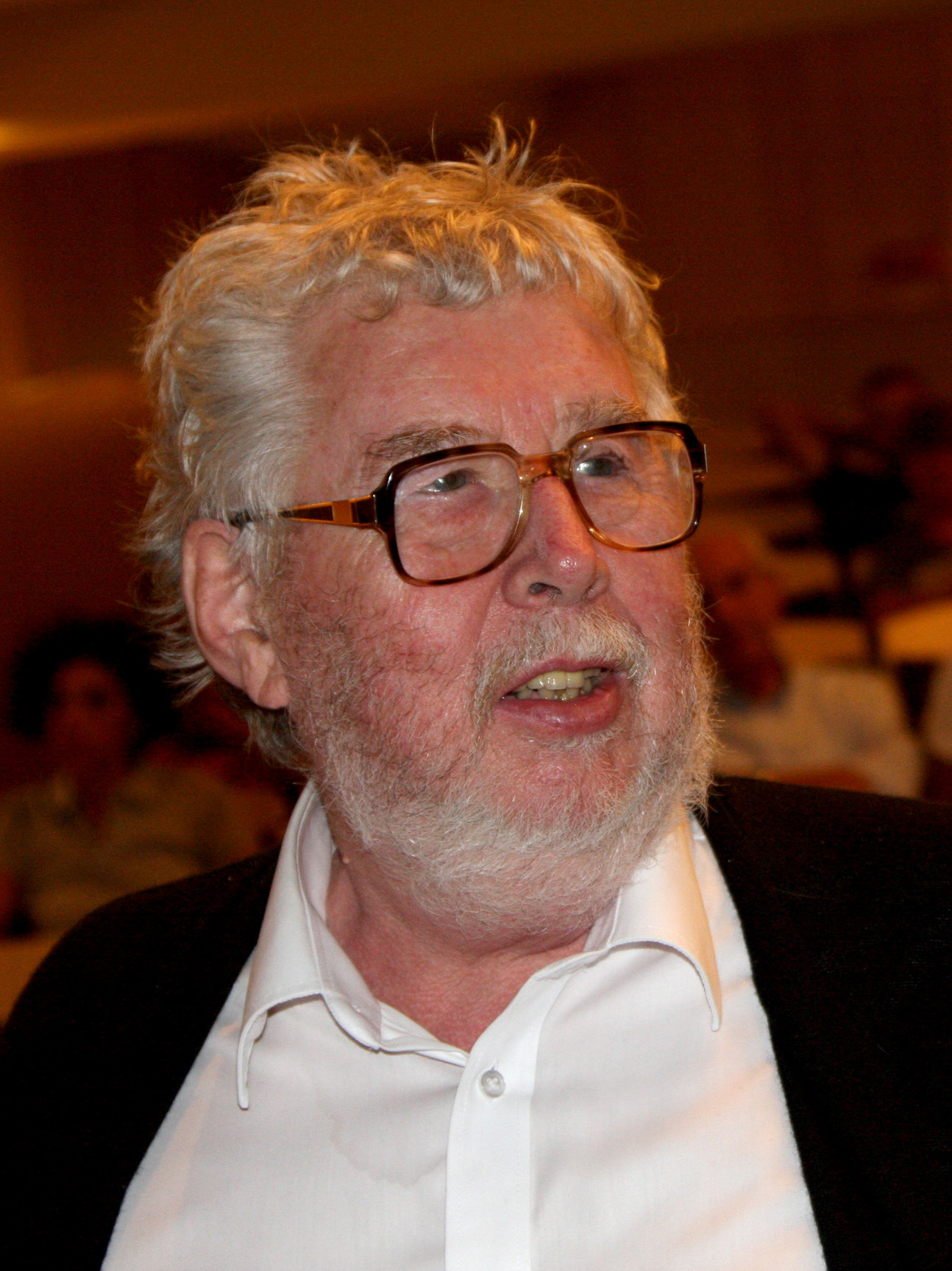
- Harrison Birtwistle, in 2008
- Composed: 1972
- Performed: 1 June 1972
- Duration: 28 minutes
- Movements: 1
- Scoring: Large orchestra

The Triumph of Time is a composition for orchestra by British composer Harrison Birtwistle written 1971 and 1972. It is one of Birtwistle's best-known compositions, as well as one of the works that earned him international reputation.

== Composition ==
According to Birtwistle himself, while working on the score he found a homonymous woodcut by Flemish painter Pieter Bruegel the Elder, which reflected his own thinking, served as an inspiration for the title and provided a clearer focus for his work. This is a part of a long line of compositions being stimulated in some way by visual art, such as Rachmaninoff's Isle of the Dead, Respighi's Trittico botticelliano, Vaughan Williams's Job: A Masque for Dancing, Henri Dutilleux's Timbres, espace, mouvement, and Mark-Anthony Turnage's Three Screaming Popes.

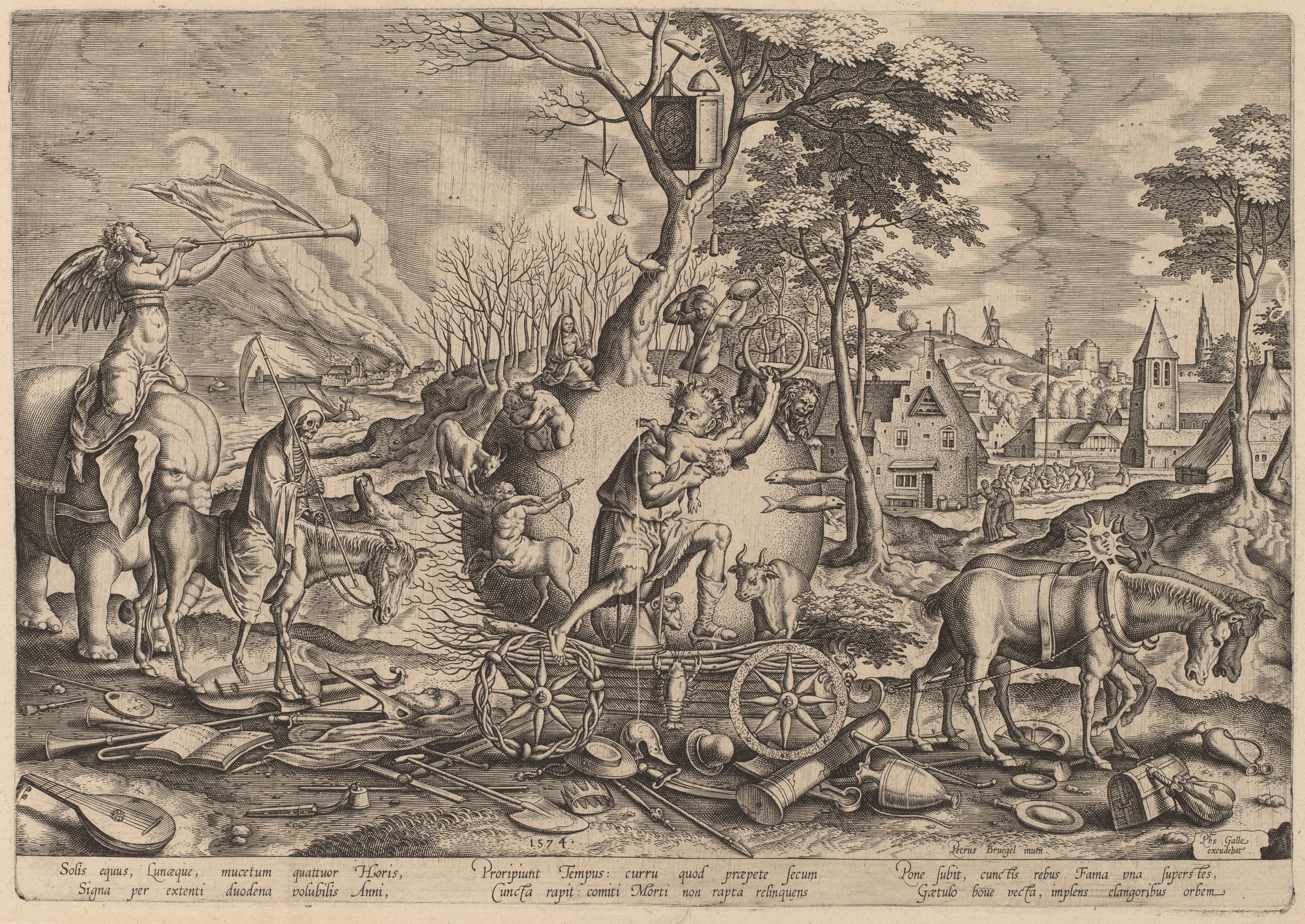
The Triumph of Time, by Pieter Bruegel the Elder. This woodcut served as inspiration to Birtwistle when writing this composition.

Bruegel's woodcut depicts a procession led by Time, on a chariot drawn by horses, followed by Death. On the background, life seems to continue as usual: maypole dancing, romantic couples, villagers. However, it is clear that Time and Death will catch up to all of them eventually. As Birtwistle explained, Bruegel's image is "made up of a (necessarily) linked chain of material object which have no necessary connexion with each other", which relates to his work as a "piece of music as the sum of musical objects, unrelated to each other, apart from one's decision to juxtapose them in time and space". This reflects the distinction that Bruegel creates between foreground (time passing) and background (time permanent).

The first type of documentation of this composition can be found in a sketchbook titled Modual Book, The Triumph of Time, dated 2 April 1970, where the composer included several ideas that were related to An Imaginary Landscape, Prologue and a preliminary abandoned version of The Triumph of Time, all composed between 1970 and 1971. Unlike most pieces that are contemporary to the Triumph, this is a fine example (and one of the few ones) of program music in the 70s. Even though The Triumph of Time was created as a standalone composition, Birtwistle said on one occasion that this work, Earth Dances and Deep Time could be viewed as a triptych, even though they were not initially planned as such and the composer never made such a connection present in his work. The final version of this composition was a commission from the Royal Philharmonic Orchestra, which gave the first performance under Lawrence Foster on 1 June 1972 at the Royal Festival Hall.

== Structure ==
The Triumph of Time is a processional in which nothing changes – the slow passing of time is the controlling factor, like in the Bruegel woodcut in which the elephant’s pace determines things.

— Harrison Birtwistle

This composition is set in one movement and has a total duration of 28 minutes. Described as a funeral march by William Mann in a review of an early recording in 1975 and by the composer himself as "a huge Adagio of Mahlerian proportions", it is quite possibly one of the finest examples of the style Birtwistle developed in the 70s, which he entitled processional music. Birtwistle himself described the piece as being "a processional in which nothing changes – the slow passing of time is the controlling factor, like in the Bruegel woodcut in which the elephant’s pace determines things"., though he has also stated that "we could say that all music is a processional", insofar as all music is continuously unfolding.

The piece is marked ♩ = ca. 40 (not faster) in the score and is mainly made up of close-knit clusters in the strings and brass, whereas important ideas come out of the rest of the texture. These ideas are presented by the amplified soprano saxophone, with a recurring three note motif (E♭, G, D), which is repeated up to seven times, and a cor anglais melody which occurs three times.

=== Scoring ===
The work is scored for the following instruments.

Woodwinds
3 flutes (3rd doubling on piccolo)
2 oboes (2nd doubling on cor anglais)
1 cor anglais
3 clarinets in B♭ (1st doubling on clarinet in E♭, 2nd and 3rd doubling on bass clarinet in B♭)
1 soprano saxophone in B♭ with amplification
2 bassoons (2nd doubling on contrabassoon)
1 contrabassoon

Brass
4 horns in F
4 trumpets in C
4 trombones
2 tubas

Percussion
5 percussionists

1 piano

Strings
2 harps
at least 20 violins
at least 9 violas
at least 9 celli
at least 9 double basses

The percussion section is particularly large in this piece:

- The 1st percussionist uses a xylophone, a bass drum, a glockenspiel, a tenor drum, 8 cowbells, and 4 bongos. The bass drum needs to be the largest and the one with the lowest pitch. However, the 4 bongos need to be of different pitches, the lowest one being higher than the highest timbale.
- The 2nd percussionist uses a vibraphone with amplification, a timpano, a bass drum with a different pitch, a tenor drum, 8 temple blocks, and 4 timbales. All timbales should have different pitches, the lowest of which should be higher than any of the unsnared drums played by the 5th percussionist.
- The 3rd percussionist uses a xylophone, a timpano, a bass drum, crotales, and 3 tam-tams. The lowest tam-tam should have the same pitch as the highest tam-tam played by the 4th percussionist.
- The 4th percussionist uses a vibraphone with amplification, a timpano, a tenor drum, 6 suspended cymbals, 2 conga drums, and 3 tam-tams. The 6 suspended cymbals should be very low-pitched, but all of them should have different pitches, as well as the conga drums. As for the tam-tams, the lowest one should have the same pitch as the highest tam-tam played by the 5th percussionist.
- The 5th player using a xylophone, a glockenspiel, a tenor drum, 6 drums without snares, a ratchet, and 3 tam-tams. All six unsnared drums should have different pitches, the lowest one being a large vertical bass drum higher in pitch than the bass drum played by the 3rd percussionist.

Birtwistle made additional remarks on the requirements for percussionists. For example, all 4 tenor drums should be as large as possible and identical.

== Reception ==
The Triumph has received very positive reviews. Pianist Joanna MacGregor described the piece in 2012 as being "sculpted, dream-like and mesmeric", and some of the younger generation of composers regard it as being "flawless" and "one of the most important orchestral scores to have been composed by an Englishman" written up until the 70s. Professor Robert Adlington stated that, unlike in Chronometer, the composer is more concerned about the qualitative aspect of time, rather than the quantitative – that is, it "involves itself not so much with time's extent and length as with the form of its motion". Scholar Seth Brodsky also stated the following about The Triumph of Time: "Cosmic or terrestrial, Birtwistle's The Triumph of Time is still one of his most disturbing pieces, a vast adagio of Mahlerian compass and inexorable tread".

== Recordings ==
Notable recordings include:

Year	Conductor	Orchestra	Label	Format
1974	Pierre Boulez	BBC Symphony Orchestra	Decca Records	CD
1993	Elgar Howarth	London Sinfonietta	Collins Classics, then NMC Records	CD
