= Wilfred Heaton =

English composer of brass band and concert music

John Wilfred Heaton (2 December 1918 – 20 May 2000) was an English composer, conductor and teacher, best known for his brass band music and for his long association with the Salvation Army.

== Early career ==
Born in Sheffield into a Salvation Army family, Heaton began piano lessons at the age of eight, gaining his LRAM performance diploma at 19. He also learned the cornet. While working at Cocking & Pace, a brass instrument manufacturing and repair shop in Sheffield, he began composing music for brass bands. He married Olive Mary Fisher (also of the Salvation Army) in 1941 and there were three daughters. During the war Heaton served with the Royal Air Force.

He composed music for the Salvation Army throughout his career, but their requirement for simple, practical music became somewhat at odds with his broader compositional ambitions. His initial studies were with the Salvation Army bandmaster and composer George Marshall. Later, in the 1950s, Heaton received tuition from Mátyás Seiber.

== Composition ==
Paul Hindmarsh has identified three compositional periods. From his first listed composition (Marching Song, 1930) until the post war period Heaton focused mostly on music for the Salvation Army. Examples include the march Praise (which achieved some popularity) and Just as I am, in the form of hymn-based variations akin to a chorale prelude. After the war he began working in a more contemporary style, influenced by William Walton, Paul Hindemith and Béla Bartók, on works such as his variations for brass band Celestial Prospect (1950), and his well known test piece for bands, Contest Music (1973). He also began writing concert music for other forces, such as the Suite for Orchestra (1950), the Rhapsody for Oboe and String Orchestra (1952, performed by Joy Boughton, and the Boyd Neel Orchestra under Norman Del Mar in 1954) and the Piano Sonata (early 1950s, first performed by Murray McLaclan on 15 August, 2024, Stoller Hall, Manchester), as well as other piano music, choral music and songs.

In his final period Heaton was mostly concerned with revising old scores from the 1940s and 1950s. During this time his professional activities - full-time teaching in Harrogate (from 1963), musical director of the Leeds Symphony Orchestra (1962–1969) and artistic director of the Yorkshire Concert Orchestra - as well as a growing interest in the Rudolf Steiner movement, resulted in him moving away from regular composition. However, following the death of his wife and his retirement from teaching, he began composing again, producing the Sinfonia Concertante for cornet and band (1990), the Trombone Concerto (1992), and two marches. His final work, Variations, was begun in 1990, but remained unfinished at his death in May 2000. It was completed by Howard Snell and premiered in Bergen on 16 January 2002 by Eikanger Bjorsvik.

== Recordings ==
The Wilfred Heaton Trust have issued six CDs of recordings, by the International Staff Band, the Black Dyke Band and the Heaton Chorus. There is a recording of Variations by the Black Dyke Band. Recordings of his piano music and songs were released in 2025 by Divine Art.
