= The Corridor (opera) =

Opera by Harrison Birtwistle

- Opera by Harrison Birtwistle
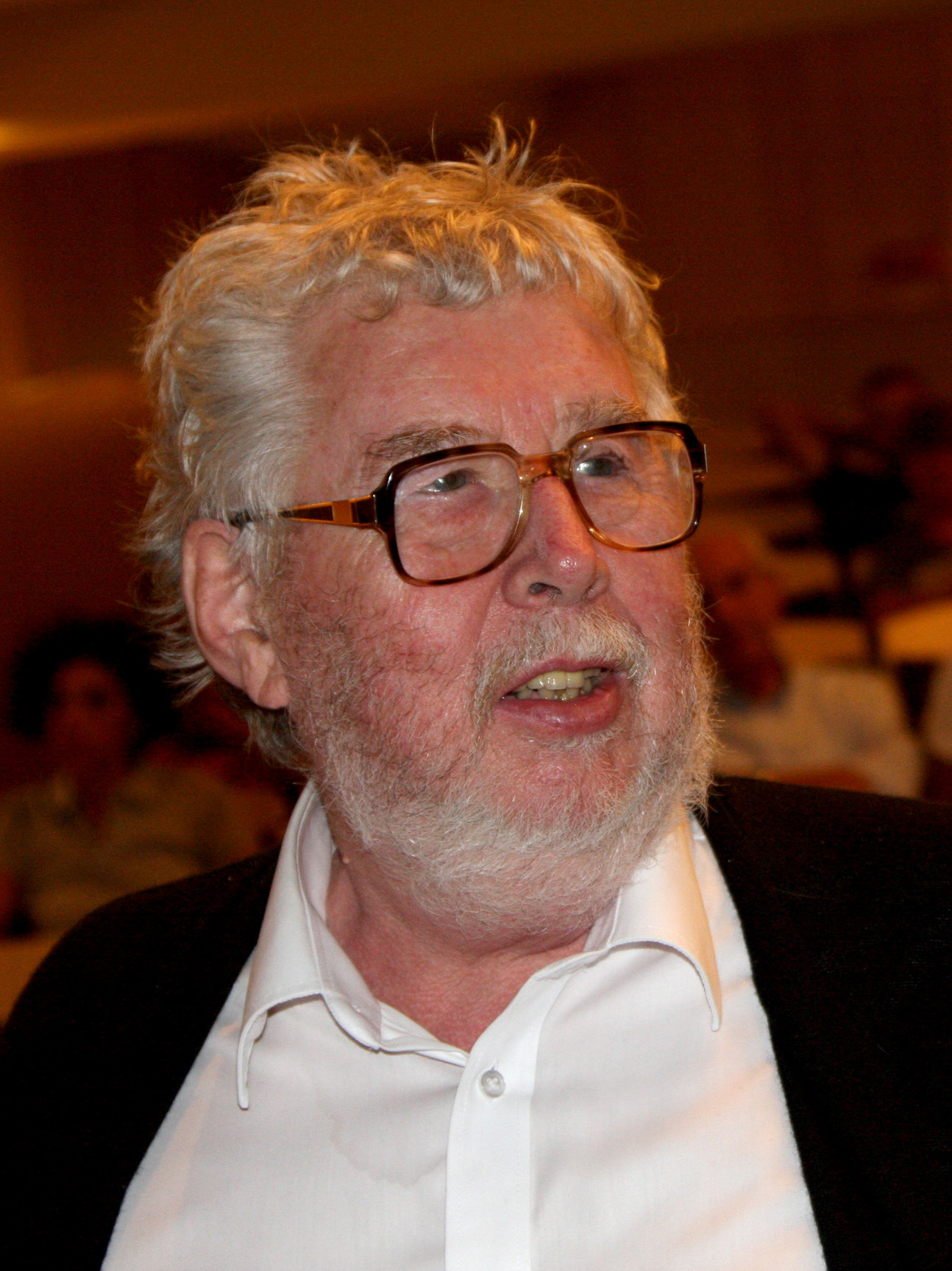
- The composer in 2008
- Librettist: David Harsent
- Language: English
- Based on: Orpheus and Eurydice
- Premiere: 12 June 2009; Aldeburgh Festival

The Corridor is a chamber opera composed by Harrison Birtwistle to an English language libretto by David Harsent. It premiered at the Aldeburgh Festival on 12 June 2009. The title refers to the corridor through which Orpheus and Eurydice passed as he was leading her from the underworld.

== Background and performance history ==
Various aspects of the myth of Orpheus have been a recurring theme in Birtwistle's work, first explored in his three-act opera The Mask of Orpheus (1986) and later incorporated into his two-act opera The Second Mrs Kong (1994). Between 2003 and 2004, he also composed The Orpheus Elegies, a 26 part song cycle for countertenor, oboe and harp based on Rilke's Sonnets to Orpheus. The Corridor focuses entirely on the moment in which Orpheus looks back at Eurydice, thus forcing her to return to the underworld forever. The opera's librettist, David Harsent, considers this one of the most brutal events in mythology:

It might not have the direct physical brutality of the death of Acteon or the flaying of Marsyas, but the combination of folly and irreversibility make for something deeper than poignancy and more visceral than regret.

Corridor was Harsent's third libretto for Birtwistle. The first two, Gawain (1991) and The Minotaur (2008), premiered at the Royal Opera House in London.

The world premiere of The Corridor on 12 June 2009 inaugurated the new Benjamin Britten Studio at Aldeburgh and was paired with the premiere of Semper Dowland, semper dolens, Birtwistle's setting of John Dowland's Lachrimæ, or Seaven Teares. Both works were commissioned by the Aldeburgh Festival and the Southbank Centre. The premiere production was directed by Peter Gill with Ryan Wigglesworth conducting the London Sinfonietta. Elizabeth Atherton sang the role of Woman (Eurydice); Mark Padmore was Man (Orpheus).

The following month, the production and original cast toured to the Queen Elizabeth Hall for the work's London premiere and to the Bregenz Festival for its Austrian premiere. The Corridor was also performed in 2010 in a concert version at Merkin Hall in New York City with Brad Lubman conducting the contemporary music ensemble, Signal. On that occasion, the opera was paired with the premiere of Nico Muhly's setting of the Stabat Mater.

== Synopsis ==
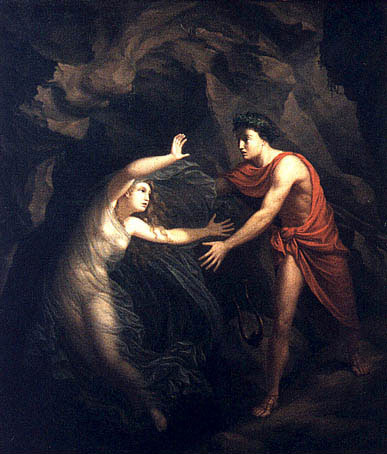
The moment when Orpheus looks back at Eurydice in an 1806 painting by Christian Gottlieb Kratzenstein

In a long corridor, Orpheus leads Eurydice out of the underworld. Hades had made a condition on Eurydice returning to life that Orpheus not look at her while leading her out. The opera opens just as Orpheus is about to reach the end of the corridor. He turns around to make sure Eurydice is still there, thus condemning her to remain in the underworld forever. In a series of arias, the couple sing to each other as Eurydice retreats down the corridor back to the underworld, leaving Orpheus to return to the world alone. The members of the orchestra are on stage with the singers and serve as the Shades (spirits of the dead). At times, they are directly addressed by the singers.

== Scoring ==
The 48 minute work is scored for two singers (soprano and tenor) and an orchestral ensemble of flute, clarinet, harp, violin, viola, and cello.
