= New Music Manchester =

New Music Manchester refers to a group of English composers and performers who studied at the Royal Manchester College of Music (now the RNCM) and Manchester University in the 1950s. The Manchester School is principally identified with the composers Harrison Birtwistle, Peter Maxwell Davies and Alexander Goehr, and together with the pianist John Ogdon and the conductor and trumpeter Elgar Howarth they formed the group New Music Manchester. Others associated with the group include David Ellis and Rodney Friend. Its members played a significant role in reshaping the landscape of British music in the later 20th century.
