= Silbury Air =

Musical composition by Harrison Birtwistle

Silbury Air is a musical composition for chamber ensemble by the English composer Sir Harrison Birtwistle.

Written in 1977 and revised in 2003, it takes as its inspiration the prehistoric mound of Silbury Hill in Wiltshire, with its connotations of the spiritual and mysterious: the precise function of Silbury Hill remains unknown. However the mood of the piece is not contemplative. It is described by the composer as "a compound artificial landscape or 'imaginary landscape', to use Paul Klee's title...presenting musical ideas through the juxtaposition and repetition of 'static blocks' or... objects." Across the two-part structure Birtwistle first focuses on the rhythmic and processional, despite the absence of what those rituals might be. Birtwistle has stated that the piece follows a strict logical pattern, but chooses not to disclose what that is, much as Silbury Hill has never revealed its purpose to archaeologists. In the second half the "Air" of the title emerges on the flute, before moving to the woodwind, at a tempo independent of the pulse of the rest of the ensemble. Four chords on the harp bring the work to a conclusion.

A performance lasts around sixteen minutes.

Silbury Air was commissioned by the Koussevitzky Foundation to mark the centenary of Serge Koussevitzky's birth. The premiere was given by the London Sinfonietta under Elgar Howarth at the Queen Elizabeth Hall on 9 March 1977.
