= John Tomlinson (bass) =

English opera singer (born 1946)

Sir John Rowland Tomlinson CBE (born 22 September 1946) is an English operatic bass.

Tomlinson was born in Oswaldtwistle, Lancashire, England. He attended Accrington Grammar School. He trained as a civil engineer at Manchester University before deciding on a career in opera at age 21. He studied with Patrick McGuigan at the Royal Northern College of Music and with Otakar Kraus. He is now President of the RNCM. Whilst studying at the RNCM, he was a member of the Manchester Universities Gilbert and Sullivan Society (MUGSS). He sings regularly with the Royal Opera and English National Opera, and has appeared with all the major British opera companies. He sang at the Bayreuth Festival in Germany every year from 1988 to 2006, as Wotan, the Wanderer, King Marke, Titurel, Gurnemanz, Hagen and the Dutchman. In 2008, he created the title role in Harrison Birtwistle's opera The Minotaur at the Royal Opera House.

== Honours ==
- He was given an Honorary Fellowship by the Royal Northern College of Music in 1996.
- He was made a Commander of the Order of the British Empire (CBE) in the 1997 New Years Honours List for his services to music.
- He was created a Knight Bachelor in the 2005 Queen's Birthday Honours List.
- He was awarded the Gold Medal of the Royal Philharmonic Society in 2014.
- He was awarded the Honorary Degree of Doctor of Music (D.Mus.) by the University of Buckingham in October 2016.
- He was awarded the Honorary Degree of Doctor of Music (D.Mus.) by the Royal College of Music on 7 March 2017.
- He was given an Honorary Fellowship by Rose Bruford College in 2017.
