= Birtwhistle =

Birtwhistle is a surname. Notable people with the surname include:

- Jacob Birtwhistle (born 1995), Australian triathlete
- John Birtwhistle (born 1946), English poet
- Tom Birtwhistle (born 1992), Australian rower

== See also ==
- Birtwistle, surname
- Birtwisle, surname
