= Birtwisle =

Birtwisle is a surname. Notable people with the surname include:

- Peter Birtwisle (born 1946), English cricketer
- Simon Birtwisle (born 1979), English cricketer

== See also ==
- Birtwhistle, surname
- Birtwistle, surname
