= Eikanger-Bjørsvik =

Brass and percussion ensemble

The Eikanger-Bjørsvik band (also known as the Eikanger band) is a brass and percussion ensemble from Alver Municipality, Norway. They are probably the best known brass band in Norway and have won the National brass band championships twenty-two times (1981, 1985, 1987, 1988, 1991, 1993, 1999, 2001, 2005, 2008, 2009, 2011, 2012, 2013, 2014, 2016, 2017, 2018, 2019, 2023, 2024 and 2026). In 1988, they became the first non-British band to win the European championships for brass band, an achievement they repeated in 1989 and 2017. The Eikanger-Bjørsvik band have worked with conductors like Helge Haukås, Peter Parkes, David King, Ingar Bergby, Elgar Howarth, Howard Snell, Bjarte Engeset and Nicholas Childs.

The name is constructed from the names of two small villages along the Osterfjorden: Eikanger and Bjørsvik, which both had their own community bands. Eikanger's, being the oldest, was founded in 1949, Bjørsvik's in 1952. In 1971, the bands merged and became a British-style brass band.
