= David Ellis (composer) =

British composer (1933–2023)

David Ellis (10 March 1933 – 20 April 2023) was an English composer, arranger and music producer at the BBC.

== Career ==
Ellis was born in Liverpool, attending the Liverpool Institute (where he first met fellow composer John McCabe), and then the Royal Manchester College of Music (1953–57) where his composition teacher was Thomas Pitfield. His contemporaries in Manchester were Harrison Birtwistle, Peter Maxwell Davies, Alexander Goehr, Elgar Howarth and John Ogdon. From 1964 Ellis worked as a producer at the BBC, becoming Head of Music for BBC North in 1977. In 1986 he took up the position of artistic director, Northern Chamber Orchestra where he was also composer-in-residence. From the mid-1990s Ellis took up composition full-time.

== Composition ==
His works include symphonies, concertos (for violin, cello, piano), works for strings (such as the Vale Royal Suite), three string quartets (1980, 1996, 2002) and much other chamber music. Ellis also had a particular interest in composing and arranging works for brass band. His catalogue stretches to 91 opus numbers.

His early orchestral Sinfonietta of 1948–50 (in four movements) was revised in 1965, and was followed by three full scale symphonies. Symphony No 1, op 38 (1972-3) was commissioned by the Royal Liverpool Philharmonic Society. No. 2, composed in 1995, had to wait until 22 October 2003 for its first performance by the BBC Philharmonic Orchestra. No. 3, Images from Beyond Infinity op.59, was composed in 1998 and is still unperformed.

The Violin Concerto was premiered by soloist Martin Milner in 1962 with the Halle Orchestra conducted by Maurice Handford. Solus for string ensemble was commissioned by the Manchester Camerata in 1972. In 2004 the Camerata also premiered the String Quartet No 3, op. 70.

David Ellis had a wide circle of musical friends, including Malcolm Arnold, Ida Carroll, Peter Hope, Antony Hopkins, John McCabe, Ian Parrott and his teacher Thomas Pitfield; and wrote a series of shorter works for them as tributes. These works include the Attleborough Tuckets, composed as a tribute for Malcolm Arnold’s 80th birthday in 2001, and the 12 pieces (of various instrumentation) collected together as Music in a Bottle, op. 77.

== Personal life ==
Ellis was married to concert pianist Patricia Cunliffe ("Pat"), who gave the first performance of his Piano Sonata in 1956. They lived at Culcheth, near Warrington, and subsequently in Bramhall, Stockport. They had three children: two girls and a boy. Pat died in 2009 and in 2011 David composed the September Threnody for strings in her memory. Later in life Ellis suffered from Alzheimer's Disease and died at the Macclesfield Infirmary, aged 90, following a fall.

== Recordings ==
- An Image of Truth: The Music of David Ellis, ASC CS CD6 (2000): Dewpoint (song cycle with chamber ensemble, 1955), Sequentia in Tempore Natali Sancti (choral, 1965), Berceuse (clarinet and piano, 1981), An Image of Truth (soprano, recorder and piano, 1972), Divertimento Elegiaco (recorder, cello and harpsichord, 1996), Four Songs (of Hope and Desire) (soprano and piano, 1996), and the String Quartet No 2 (1996).
- Concert Music, Divine Art, DDA25119 (2014). Vale Royal Suite, Diversions (1974), Concert Music (1959), September Threnody for strings (2011), Solus (1973).
- Chamber Music and Songs, Prima Facia PFCD138 (2020): Includes: Concertante for violin, horn and harp, op. 78 (2004), Fipple-Baguette: Three Encores for solo recorder, op. 76, Concerto Corto e Dolce, for recorder, viola and harp, op. 80 (2006), Dewpoint (1955).
