= Northern Chamber Orchestra =

Chamber Orchestra based in Manchester

The Northern Chamber Orchestra (NCO) is a British chamber orchestra based in Manchester, England. Established in 1967, the orchestra gives concerts at The Kings' School, Macclesfield and The Stoller Hall, Manchester as well as a Christmas concert at Tatton Park, Knutsford and one-off engagements around the country. They are also currently the resident orchestra for the Buxton Festival.

== History ==
The NCO was founded in 1967, and gave its concerts at The Heritage Centre in Macclesfield. Diana Cummings was leader and soloist of the NCO for 10 years, from 1975 to 1985. From 1985 to 2022, the NCO's musical director and leader was Nicholas Ward. David Ellis served as the NCO's artistic director and composer-in-residence from 1986 until the mid-1990's.

In 2022, the NCO announced the relocation of its concerts from The Heritage Centre to The Kings' School. In July 2024, the NCO announced the appointments of Zöe Beyers as its next music director and of Sarah Brandwood-Spencer as its new associate director.

The orchestra has recorded commercially for the Naxos label, including works by composers such as Joseph Haydn, Wolfgang Amadeus Mozart and Georg Philipp Telemann.
