= Howard Snell (musician) =

English Musician

Howard Dunster Snell (born 21 September 1936) was born in Wollaston, Northamptonshire, England.

== Biography ==
=== Study ===
Snell trained at the Royal Academy of Music in London (1953–56), studying trumpet with George Eskdale, then Principal Trumpet with the London Symphony Orchestra. He also studied piano, harmony and counterpoint. Together with Cornelius Cardew, Richard Rodney Bennett, Nicholas Maw and others he was active in starting an unofficial New Music Club. Cardew and Bennett both wrote several solo works for Snell to play: they included Cardew's Rhythmic Pieces and Bennett's Parallels, both of which, several years later (late 1950s), he performed at an Aldeburgh Festival Concert with the composers in the Jubilee Hall.

=== Career ===
==== As trumpeter ====
Snell's first position as a trumpet player was as Principal Trumpet with the Sadlers Wells Opera Orchestra (1957-1960). In September 1960 he joined the London Symphony Orchestra as Assistant Principal, moving later in the 60s to the Principal chair. While with the LSO he recorded (EMI) as a soloist (Grace Williams Concerto) and twice on BBC1TV (Hummel, Haydn). He was a member of the LSO's Board of Directors for nine years (1966–75), the last five of which were as chairman. During this period he also held the position of Principal Trumpet with the London Sinfonietta continuing his interest in contemporary music. Hans Werner Henze's Sonatina for Solo Trumpet (dedicated to Snell) was another result of this interest. On leaving the LSO in August 1976, of the next two years he freelanced in the studios, additionally serving as Principal Trumpet of the English Chamber Orchestra during that time. He terminated his playing career in August 1978.

==== As orchestral conductor ====
At the start of the 1970s, while still in the LSO, Snell had begun conducting, focussing on classical repertoire with the Erato Orchestra, an expert amateur orchestra made up mainly of former NYO players. In 1976 he founded his own Wren Orchestra, and sponsored by London's Capital Radio, their first concert series took place at the Mermaid Theatre in the summer of 1976. The Wren Orchestra's relationship with Capital Radio continued for the next two decades, with commercial recordings in the early 1980s of mainstream repertoire (Mozart, Haydn, Tschaikovsky, Gershwin and Copland) for Warner Records. As conductor of the English Haydn Festival in Bridgnorth in the early 1990s he maintained his interest in a composer he especially values. However by the late 1980s Snell had already begun a gradual move to the activities that would hold his attention thereafter.

==== As a freelance conductor, arranger/composer and teacher ====
On leaving the London Symphony Orchestra, a chance conversation with a colleague James Watson generated Watson's suggestion that, similar to Elgar Howarth's work with Grimethorpe Colliery Band and the latter's development of a significantly wider repertoire, Snell might be interested in similar work with Desford Colliery Band. Taking that opportunity led to the band's rise to prominence while initiating a significant volume of arrangements for brass band by Snell that introduced band audiences and players to unfamiliar repertoire. In addition, with the then East Midlands Arts helpful co-operation, Snell commissioned a number of new works by British composers.

Following his work at Desford the rebuilding of the Foden's Band then followed. From 1987 he undertook the long-term development of the Eikanger Band in Norway and the Co-operative Wholesale Society Band in Scotland.

He now focusses on composition rather than arranging: his work Gallery was the test piece for the British Brass Band Championships held in the Royal Albert Hall, London, in 2017. During the period 1980 to 2012 he continued teaching in a wide range of disciplines including conducting and writing for brass. During his time at the Royal Northern College of Music, apart from his activities in the Brass Department, when he founded and created the Brass Band Course and a Brass Band Conductors' Course, he also for several years worked with the symphony and chamber orchestras. His teaching activities bore fruit in two books, firstly The Trumpet – Its Practice and Performance, A Guide for Students, which was very warmly received on its publication in 1996, and secondly The Art of Practice followed, for student performers on all instruments. A book of insights and opinion (rather than direct instruction) on conducting and music performance is in preparation. From 1998 to 2012 he was appointed a Professor at the Royal Academy of Music, which elected him both a Fellow and an Associate. This was a particularly happy and productive period in his teaching career.

He was awarded the Iles Medal in 1995 by the Worshipful Company of Musicians and received the Hubert Whiteley Award for Creativity in 2017.

He publishes his compositions, arrangements and books through Rakeway Music.

=== Personal life ===
Howard Snell currently lives in South-West France with Angela, a fellow musician and his wife of 54 years, but finds himself as active as ever. His only remaining non-musical ambition is to build a small shed, expressly designed for sitting in, looking out, and doing nothing at all.

== Compositions ==
=== Works for Brass Band ===
- Excelsior! (1998-1999)
- Bank Holiday
- Dream Nocturne...
- Exhibition Can Can
- Four Bagatelles
  1. Refrains and Choruses
  2. Ballad
  3. Improvisation
  4. Galop
- Greensleeves
- Images of the Millennium
  1. Scherzo - The Crystal Palace
  2. Dream - Nocturne
  3. Odyssey
- The Old Chalet
- Oration, for solo euphonium and brass band
- Postcard from Mexico
- Variations on "Drink to me Only", for solo euphonium and brass band

=== Kamermuziek ===
- Fantasy, for euphonium
- Four Bagatelles, for tenor horn

== Publications ==
- Howard Snell: The Art of Practice, ISBN 1-905203-28-4
