= Earth Dances =

1986 orchestral work by Harrison Birtwistle

Earth Dances is an orchestral work by British composer Harrison Birtwistle. Its title is part of a geological metaphor that is also found in the piece's structure: Birtwistle has divided the orchestra into six 'strata', whose changing relationships reflect those of the earth's geological layers. It was composed in 1986 for the BBC Symphony Orchestra.
