= Silas Birtwistle =

British artist and sculptor

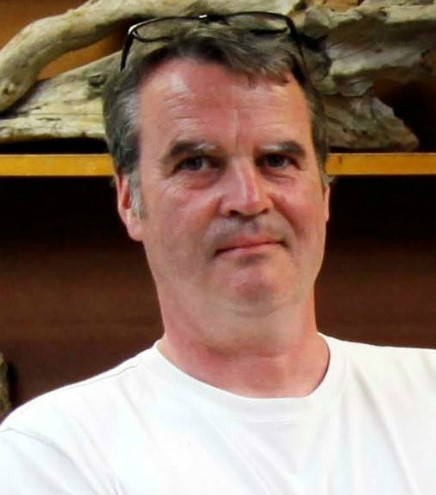

Silas Birtwistle (born 1963) is a British artist and sculptor known for his works using recycled and sustainable materials.

== Biography ==
Silas Birtwistle was born in Shaftesbury, Dorset in 1963. He is the son of the composer Sir Harrison Birtwistle and the brother of artist Adam Birtwistle.

He attended Portree High School, Isle of Skye, Scotland before attaining BA Hons English/History and an MA in Furniture Design.

Birtwistle lives and works in Somerset, England.

== Works ==
- Biomimic Tree
- Voices from the Good Earth
- My Friend Tree
- Chieftain Iffucan of Azcan
- A Fish from the Sea's Edge
- A Table from the Sea's Edge

== United Nations Climate Change Conferences ==
2004 United Nations Climate Change conference (COP 10), Nagoya, Japan. (PDF) – http://ifad-un.blogspot.com/2016/11/ifad-at-development-climate-days-at.html

2005 United Nations Climate Change Conference (COP 11), Montreal, Quebec, Canada – https://www.thehindu.com/news/cities/Hyderabad/fish-speaks-for-threatened-marine-life/article3971428.ece

2007 United Nations Climate Change Conference (COP 13), Bali, Indonesia – https://www.ifad.org/en_GB/newsroom/press_release/tags/p77/y2016/36289916

2017 United Nations Climate Change Conference (UNFCCC COP23), Bonn, Germany – http://www.unmultimedia.org/avlibrary/asset/2030/2030474/
