= Panic (Birtwistle) =

1995 concert piece

Panic is a concertante work for alto saxophone, jazz drum kit, woodwinds, brass and percussion by Harrison Birtwistle. It was written in 1995, having been commissioned by John Drummond in his last season as director of the BBC Proms. It premiered at the Last Night of the Proms on 16 September 1995 at the Royal Albert Hall, London, and was broadcast live on BBC television and Radio 3. At the premiere the solo saxophone part was played by John Harle, the drum kit by Paul Clarvis and the BBC Symphony Orchestra was conducted by Andrew Davis.

Panic was out of character for the Last Night of the Proms, which typically draws a wide audience with familiar, patriotic music. The BBC received complaints from the public, but the piece was better received by music critics.

Its full name is Panic: A Dithyramb for alto saxophone, jazz drummer, wind, brass and percussion. The title indicates both the nature of the music and the fact that it is a representation of the Classical Greek god Pan.

== Structure and style ==
The piece is scored for solo alto saxophone, jazz drum kit, 3 flutes (nos. 2 & 3 doubling piccolo), 3 oboes (no. 3 doubling cor anglais), 2 clarinets in B♭ (no. 2 doubling clarinet in E♭), bass clarinet, 3 bassoons (no. 3 doubling contrabassoon), 4 horns, 4 trumpets (no. 1 doubling piccolo trumpet), 3 trombones, tuba, timpani and percussion.

The playing time is approximately 18 minutes.

The score is prefaced by a quotation from Elizabeth Barrett Browning's poem A Musical Instrument:

O what is he doing the great god Pan
Down by the reeds by the river.
Spreading ruin and scattering ban...

Harrison Birtwistle has said of the piece:

I have called the work a dithyramb, in Classical Greece a choric song in honour of Dionysus, whose wild exuberance here runs riot. The soloist, as chorus leader, is identified with the mythic god Pan... The title Panic refers to the feelings of ecstasy and terror experienced by animals in the night at the sound of Pan's music.

The music is heavily focused on the solo saxophone which plays almost uninterruptedly throughout, at times seeming to overwhelm the accompanying wind and percussion. Some commentators have noted that the saxophone is clearly identified with Pan himself ("there appears little doubt about the soloist's identification with the work's protagonist").

The overall style of the music has been described as "raucous", "violen[t]", "wild" and "chaotic".

== Reception ==
Panic has been called a succès de scandale due to the widespread negative press it received at its premiere.

As it was part of the programme of the Last Night of the 1995 Proms season it was broadcast live on BBC television and Radio 3. Although the Proms has a tradition of premiering new music, the Last Night was traditionally associated with "safe" traditional patriotic pieces such as "Rule, Britannia!" and "Land of Hope and Glory". Subsequently the BBC was reported to have received "thousands" of complaints. The New York Times described the Last Night of the Proms as "traditionally jingoistic", and quoted Birtwhistle as saying, "I was treading on a sacred cow and the attendant manure".

Some newspaper comments were scathing, chiefly from non-music journalists who had their attention drawn to it because of its prominent scheduling, although John Harle said that he "read a nice review on the Monday [following the concert]".

There were in fact several positive notices by music journalists: Hilary Finch in The Times stated that the piece had "tremendous, unremitting energy". Robert Maycock in The Independent stated that "John Harle played it with astonishing physical and expressive power, and the drummer, Paul Clarvis, matched precision with brilliance."

These more measured views have remained. In 2012 it was described by Tom Service in The Guardian as "one of the most dazzling and dynamic pieces written in the last 20 years".

== Recordings ==
- Argo/Decca - John Harle (saxophone), Paul Clarvis (drum kit), BBC Symphony Orchestra, Andrew Davis (conductor)
- Metronome - Marcus Weiss (saxophone), Christian Dierstein (drum kit), Windkraft Tirol, Kasper de Roo (conductor)
