= Adam Birtwistle =

British artist

Adam Birtwistle (born 1959) is a British artist whose idiosyncratic portraits of composers and musicians are represented in the National Portrait Gallery.

== Biography ==
Adam Birtwistle was born in Eton in 1959 and is the son of the composer Sir Harrison Birtwistle and brother of the artist Silas Birtwistle. After attending schools in Britain and the US, he studied sculpture for four years at Chelsea School of Art and followed this with two years at the Arch Bronze Foundry, working with Ben Kneale. In 1985 he took part in designing masks and costumes for one of his father’s music theatre pieces at Dartington Summer School of Music.

In 1986 he attended printing classes at the Royal Academy while preparing his first one-man show in London with Piano Nobile Fine Paintings. Since then he has regularly held solo shows at Piano Nobile and completed numerous commissions.

== Commissions and paintings ==
Two paintings by Birtwistle have been purchased by the National Portrait Gallery in London: a portrait of his father, Sir Harrison, and one of Elvis Costello (Declan McManus). Other musicians, conductors and composers to feature in his paintings include the pianist Alfred Brendel, and the composers Hans Werner Henze and Sir Michael Tippett.

In 1999, he was commissioned by Curtis Price to paint a portrait of his father for Dukes Hall at the Royal Academy of Music.

The following year, 2000, he was asked to paint portraits of six composers, whose operas were to be featured during the 2001 Glyndebourne Festival: Mozart, Beethoven, Verdi, Janáček, Britten and again Adam’s father, Sir Harrison. He was subsequently commissioned by Glyndebourne to paint the film and stage director, Sir Peter Hall, the artist and stage designer, David Hockney, the opera singer Anja Silja, as well as Sir George Christie, the then chairman of the Glyndebourne Festival, and his wife, Lady Christie.

Among others, Birtwistle has done portraits of the painters Craigie Aitchison and Peter Blake. Fascinated by ‘performers’ of all descriptions, his subjects vary from the astronomer, Sir Patrick Moore, and Winston Churchill, through to the actor Jeremy Irons and Dame Marjorie Scardino. In 2008 he was commissioned by the broadcaster Nick Ross to produce a series of ten paintings called "Black is White" to confront racial stereotypes. The exhibition was launched by Trevor Philips who chairs Britain's Commission for Equalities and Human Rights. The cycle includes a triptych of arguably the three most significant American black civil rights activists, Marcus Garvey, Dr Martin Luther King and Malcolm X, along with race reversal portraits of the iconic faces of Marilyn Monroe, Jessye Norman, Charles Dickens, Albert Einstein, Pablo Picasso, Abraham Lincoln and Birtwistle's second take on Sir Winston Churchill though this time painted as he would have looked with black skin pigmentation.

== Critical comments ==
Lord Gowrie, chairman of the Art Council (1994/1998), described Adam Birtwistle as "an artist who brings off something uncommon and difficult. He is a serious painter with wit. This quality shows in both composition and brushwork."

Dr Charles Saumarez Smith, secretary and chief executive of the Royal Academy and formerly director of the National Gallery, regarded Adam Birtwistle as "one of the best of his generation" (*), while art critic Godfrey Barker called him "…one of our most distinguished portrait painters in what is, presently, a Golden Age of Portraiture in Britain."

Object of the Week Daily Telegraph 20 May 2002... Glyndebourne, the celebrated Sussex opera house, unveiled six paintings of people closely associated with it. They were all by Adam Birtwistle.
