= Bill Birtwistle =

New Zealand rugby union player

- Born: William Murray Birtwistle; 4 July 1939 (age 87) Auckland, New Zealand
- Height: 1.80 m (5 ft 11 in)
- Weight: 73 kg (161 lb)
- School: Mount Roskill Grammar School
- Notable relative: Mark Birtwistle (nephew)

Rugby union career
- Position: Wing
Provincial / State sides
Years	Team	Apps	(Points)
1961	Auckland	2	
1962–1966	Canterbury		
1967–1970	Waikato	29	
International career
Years	Team	Apps	(Points)
1965–1967	New Zealand	7	(12)

William Murray Birtwistle (born 4 July 1939) is a former New Zealand rugby union player. A wing three-quarter, Birtwistle represented Auckland, Canterbury and Waikato at a provincial level, and was a member of the New Zealand national side, the All Blacks, from 1965 to 1967. He played 12 matches for the All Blacks including seven internationals.
