= Mark Birtwistle =

Samoa international rugby union player

- Born: Mark Leslie Birtwistle; 17 October 1962 (age 64) Auckland, New Zealand
- Notable relative(s): Bill Birtwistle (uncle); Beaudene Birtwistle (son)

Rugby union career
- Position: Lock
Amateur team(s)
Years	Team	Apps	(Points)
1985–1990	Suburbs		
1986–1991	Pukekohe		
1992	Hutt Old Boys		
Provincial / State sides
Years	Team	Apps	(Points)
1985–1990	Auckland B	2	(4)
1986–1989	Counties Manukau	31	(8)
1992	Wellington	14	(4)
1993	Auckland	6	(5)
1994–1995	Counties Manukau	18	(10)
1996	Auckland	5	(15)
International career
Years	Team	Apps	(Points)
1991–1996	Samoa	11	(0)

Mark Leslie Birtwistle (born 17 October 1962 in Auckland) is a New Zealand-born Samoan former rugby union footballer. He played as lock.

== Career ==
He debuted in the 1991 Rugby World Cup, in the match against Wales at Cardiff, on 6 October 1991. His last international match was against Ireland, at Lansdowne Road on 12 November 1996.

== Personal life ==
He is the nephew of the former rugby union footballer Bill Birtwistle, who was a former three-quarter who played for Waikato and for the All Blacks in the 1967 New Zealand rugby union tour of Britain, France and Canada. Currently, he is coach of the Suburbs Rugby Club from Auckland. He is father of Beaudene Birtwistle, who plays as loose forward for Samoa Under-20 and for Counties Manukau.
