= Nederlandse Reisopera =

The Nederlandse Reisopera (formerly Nationale Reisopera) is a Dutch opera company based in Enschede, Netherlands. Founded in 1955, the company performs an annual season of fully staged operas. The organization regularly tours their productions, and is often referred to internationally as the Dutch Touring Opera. In 1988 the company presented the European premiere of John Adams's Nixon in China.
