= Mark Padmore =

British opera singer (born 1961)

Mark Padmore CBE
- Born: 8 March 1961 (age 65); London, England
- Education: King's College, Cambridge
- Occupation: Tenor
- Spouse: Josette Simon (div.)
- Children: 1
- Website: www.markpadmore.com

Mark Padmore CBE (born 8 March 1961) is a British tenor appearing in concerts, recitals, and opera.

== Early life ==
He was born in London on 8 March 1961, and raised in Canterbury, Kent, England. Padmore studied clarinet and piano prior to his gaining a choral scholarship to King's College, Cambridge. He graduated in 1982 with an honours degree in music.

== Career ==
Padmore has appeared in Bach's St Matthew and St John Passions with the Berlin Philharmonic and Sir Simon Rattle, staged by Peter Sellars, including Berlin, Salzburg, New York and the BBC Proms.

In the opera house, Padmore has worked with directors Peter Brook, Katie Mitchell, Mark Morris and Deborah Warner. He performed leading roles such as in Harrison Birtwistle's The Corridor and The Cure at the Aldeburgh Festival and in London. He appeared in Handel's Jephtha for Welsh National Opera and English National Opera, and as Captain Vere in Britten's Billy Budd. He performed as the Evangelist in a scenic version of the St Matthew Passion for the Glyndebourne Festival Opera. He also played Peter Quint in an acclaimed BBC TV production of Britten's The Turn of the Screw and recorded the title role of Mozart's La Clemenza di Tito with conductor René Jacobs for Harmonia Mundi. Padmore appeared as Third Angel/John in George Benjamin's Written on Skin with the Royal Opera House in 2017.

In concert, he has performed with the world's leading orchestras including the Munich Radio, Berlin, Vienna, New York and London Philharmonic Orchestras, the Royal Concertgebouw Orchestra, Boston and London Symphony Orchestras and the Philharmonia.

Padmore has given recitals worldwide. He appears frequently at Wigmore Hall, London where he first sang all three Schubert song cycles in May 2008, and was their artist in residence in the 2009/10 season.

== Recordings ==
His discography includes Beethoven's Missa solemnis with Bernard Haitink and Bavarian Radio Symphony Orchestra and lieder by Beethoven, Haydn and Mozart with Kristian Bezuidenhout for Harmonia Mundi with whom Padmore has also recorded Handel arias a collection As Steals the Morn with the English Concert (BBC Music Magazine Vocal Award); Schubert cycles with Paul Lewis (Winterreise won the 2010 Gramophone Vocal Solo Award); Schumann's Dichterliebe with Bezuidenhout (2011 Edison Klassiek Award) and Britten's Serenade and Nocturne, and Finzi's Dies Natalis with the Britten Sinfonia (ECHO/Klassik 2013 award); The staged St Matthew Passion with the Berlin Philharmonic and Rattle was awarded the BBC Music Magazine 2013 DVD Award.

== Honors ==
Padmore was appointed Commander of the Order of the British Empire (CBE) in the 2019 Birthday Honours for services to music.

== Personal life ==
Padmore married the actress Josette Simon (OBE); the couple had one daughter together (b. c. 2000–2001) before they divorced; in a 2020 interview, Simon refers to Padmore as a "life-long friend".
