= The Minotaur (opera) =

Opera

- Opera by Harrison Birtwistle
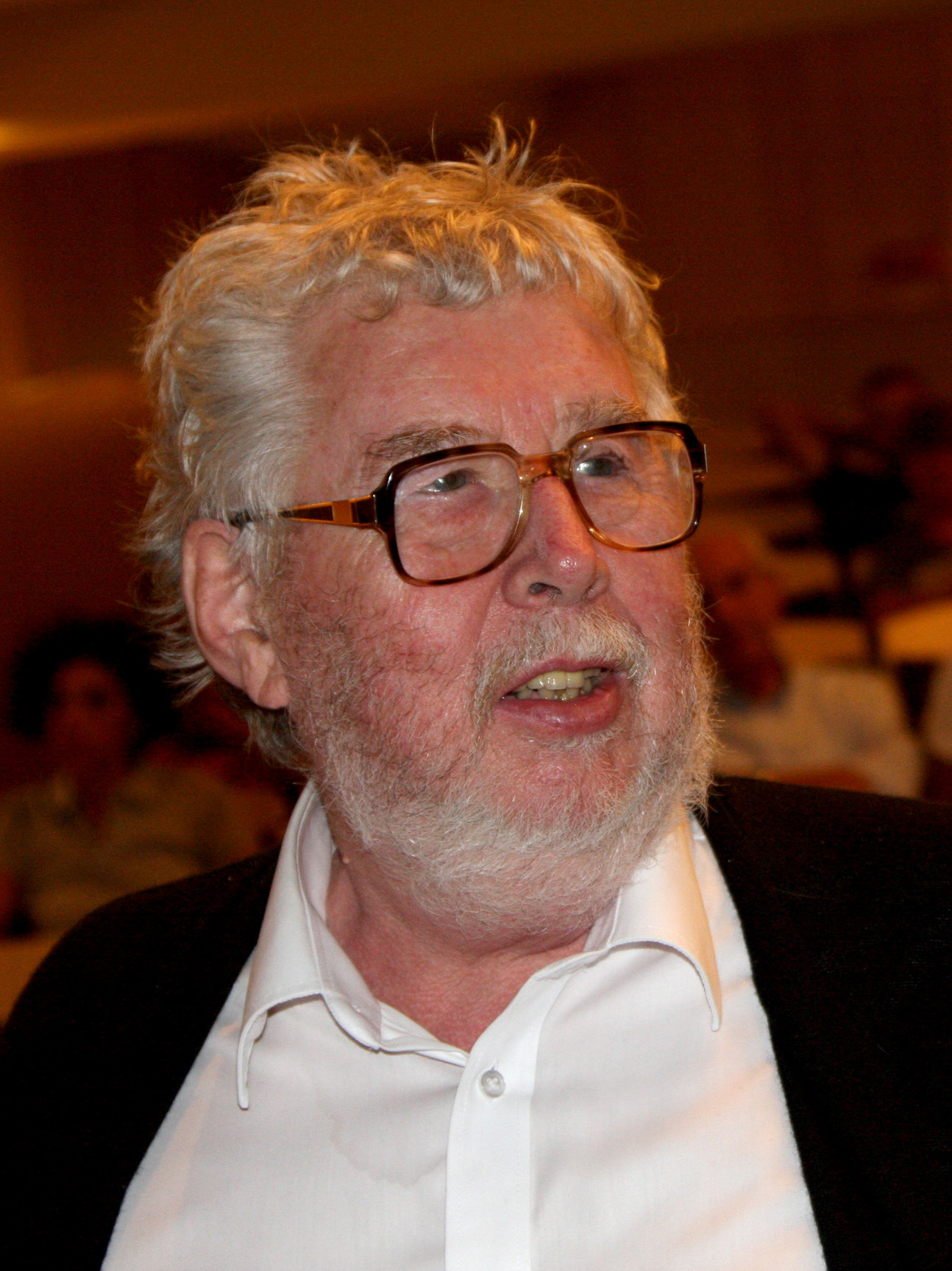
- The composer in 2008
- Librettist: David Harsent
- Language: English
- Based on: Minotaur
- Premiere: 15 April 2008; Royal Opera House, London

The Minotaur is an opera in two acts, with 13 scenes by English composer Harrison Birtwistle to a libretto by poet David Harsent, commissioned by the Royal Opera House in London. The work, a retelling of the Greek myth of the Minotaur, premiered at the Royal Opera House on 15 April 2008 under the stage direction of Stephen Langridge. The score is modernistic, and the scenes fall into three types: bullfights; scenes between Ariadne and Theseus; and dream sequences for the Minotaur, in which the creature has the gift of speech. The opera lasts about 140 minutes. A detailed analysis of the opera was published by Rhian Samuel.

The opera was revived at the Royal Opera House for five performances in early 2013, featuring most of the original cast, most notably Christine Rice, John Tomlinson, Andrew Watts and Johan Reuter.

== Roles ==
Birtwistle wrote the title role for John Tomlinson's voice. Tomlinson also created the role of the Green Knight in Birtwistle's 1990 opera Gawain.

Role	Voice type	Premiere cast, 15 April 2008 Conductor: Antonio Pappano
The Minotaur (Asterios)	bass	John Tomlinson
Theseus	baritone	Johan Reuter
Ariadne	mezzo-soprano	Christine Rice
Snake Priestess	countertenor (en travesti)	Andrew Watts
Innocents	soprano soprano mezzo-soprano countertenor countertenor	Rebecca Bottone; Pumeza Matshikiza; Wendy Dawn Thompson; Christopher Ainslie; Tim Mead
Hiereus	tenor	Philip Langridge
Ker	soprano	Amanda Echalaz

Premiere production staff

Director	Stephen Langridge
Designer	Alison Chitty
Lighting	Paul Pyant
Choreography	Philippe Giraudeau
Video design	Leo Warner, Mark Grimmer

== Theme ==
From the programme notes:

The Minotaur does not fully comprehend the duality of his physical nature as half-bull, half-man; only in sleep and, ultimately, in death does his human side become evident. Ariadne hopes that, with the help of the Oracle, she will enable Theseus to find a way out of the labyrinth should he survive his encounter with the Minotaur. She believes she can persuade Theseus to take her back with him to Athens. Both see the Minotaur as scapegoat and deliverance.

The last scene of The Minotaur echoes the death scene of Mussorgsky's Boris Godunov.

== Instrumentation ==
The instrumentation is as follows.

Woodwinds

3 flutes (2nd and 3rd doubling piccolo)
3 oboes (3rd also English horn)
4 clarinets (1st B♭, A; 2nd B♭, A, E♭, and bass clarinet; 3rd B♭, A, and bass clarinet; 4th bass clarinet and contrabass clarinet)
1 alto saxophone
3 bassoons (3rd also double bassoon)

Brass

4 French horns
4 trumpets
4 trombones (4th also contrabass trombone)
2 tubas

Percussion

cimbalom

timpani (2 sets on stage)

4 percussionists: xylophone, glockenspiel, vibraphone, crotales, güiro, 3 higher tom-toms, 3 lower tom-toms, small bass drum, very large bass drum, 2 log drums, triangles, 4 wood blocks, 4 temple blocks, 2 bongos, 2 congas, 4 suspended cymbals, 3 tam-tams, 2 large nipple gongs

Strings

2 harps

14 violin I's
12 violin II's
10 violas
8 cellos
7 double basses

== Synopsis ==
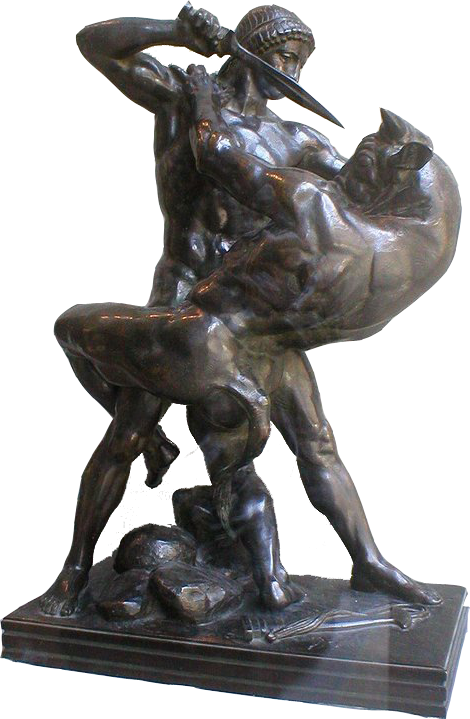
Theseus and the Minotaur, bronze by Antoine-Louis Barye (1840)

Scene 1: Arrival

Ariadne watches as a Greek ship arrives on the island of Crete, carrying the Innocents who will be sacrificed to the Minotaur: a monstrous creature, half-man, half-bull. Ariadne greets the Innocents and notices Theseus in the crowd. He has come to Crete to defeat the Minotaur.

Scene 2: The Choice

Theseus tells Ariadne about his departure from Athens with the Innocents. Ariadne believes that Theseus offers her a means of escape from Crete. She plays a game of chance with him using a stone: if he chooses the hand in which she holds the stone he will enter the labyrinth to confront the Minotaur, but if he chooses her empty hand he must remain a bystander to the bloodshed. Ariadne cheats so that Theseus chooses the empty hand.

Scene 3: The Labyrinth

The Innocents enter the labyrinth, praying to the gods to bring them out safely.

Scene 4: Ariadne

Ariadne recounts the circumstances surrounding the birth of her half-brother, the Minotaur: her mother's union with a white bull from the sea, which was either sent by Poseidon, or was the sea god himself in disguise.

Scene 5: The Labyrinth

The Innocents reach the heart of the labyrinth. The Minotaur is taunted by the chorus for his monstrous form and inability to speak. His first victim, a young woman, appears and the Minotaur gores and rapes her. Keres feed upon the body and sing of destruction.

Scene 6: The Minotaur Dreams

The Minotaur acquires the power of speech in his dreams. Asleep, he reflects on his imprisonment in the labyrinth and violent existence. An image of Ariadne appears and tells the story of his birth. She is interrupted by a mysterious and disturbing figure; unknown to the Minotaur, it is Theseus.

Scene 7: The Labyrinth

The chorus urges the Minotaur to wake. They taunt him as he brutally massacres the Innocents. When they have all been killed or mortally injured, the Keres descend again to feast upon the bodies.

Scene 8: A Proposition

Ariadne tries to dissuade Theseus from confronting the Minotaur. He remains determined, revealing that – like the Minotaur – he may be the son of Poseidon. Ariadne tries to seduce Theseus and persuade him to take her to Greece when he returns. He is unmoved.

Scene 9: The Minotaur Dreams

Asleep again, the Minotaur voices his despair at his compromised existence. An image of Ariadne appears and he wonders whether she might help him to escape the labyrinth. Ariadne meanwhile asks the Minotaur "are you my key to the world outside?" Theseus appears again as a shadowy figure.

Scene 10: The Oracle at Psychro

Ariadne asks the Snake Priestess how she might help Theseus escape the labyrinth. In return for her assistance, she hopes she can persuade Theseus to take her to Athens. The Snake Priestess, speaking through the Hiereus, advises Ariadne to give Theseus a ball of twine. If he unwinds it as he descends into the labyrinth, he will be able to retrace his journey to the outside world. The Snake Priestess also confirms that Ariadne will set sail for Athens with Theseus.

Scene 11: A Blind Bargain

Ariadne relays the Snake Priestess's prophecy to Theseus. Theseus sets off to confront the Minotaur.

Scene 12: The Labyrinth

Theseus meets the Minotaur at the centre of the labyrinth and they engage in brutal fighting, cheered on by the chorus. Theseus hesitates momentarily when the Minotaur acquires the power of human speech, but then delivers the fatal blow. Theseus begins his journey out of the labyrinth. Once he has escaped, he intends to set sail for Athens with Ariadne.

Scene 13: Death of the Minotaur

As the Minotaur lies dying, he laments his empty existence, neither fully man nor fully beast. He pulls out the bloodied sword from his side and declares that he is the son of Poseidon. The chorus leave the labyrinth as the Minotaur dies. A Ker enters to feed on his body.

== Reception ==
The Minotaur was ranked third in a 2019 poll by The Guardian of the greatest classical works of the 21st century, with Andrew Clements arguing that the opera has "music of lyrical beauty and pungent transparency."

== Recording ==
- Birtwistle: The Minotaur – DVD recorded live at the Royal Opera House, Covent Garden, on 25 April, 30 April, and 3 May 2008. Opus Arte OA1000D.
