= Collins Classics =

Former record company

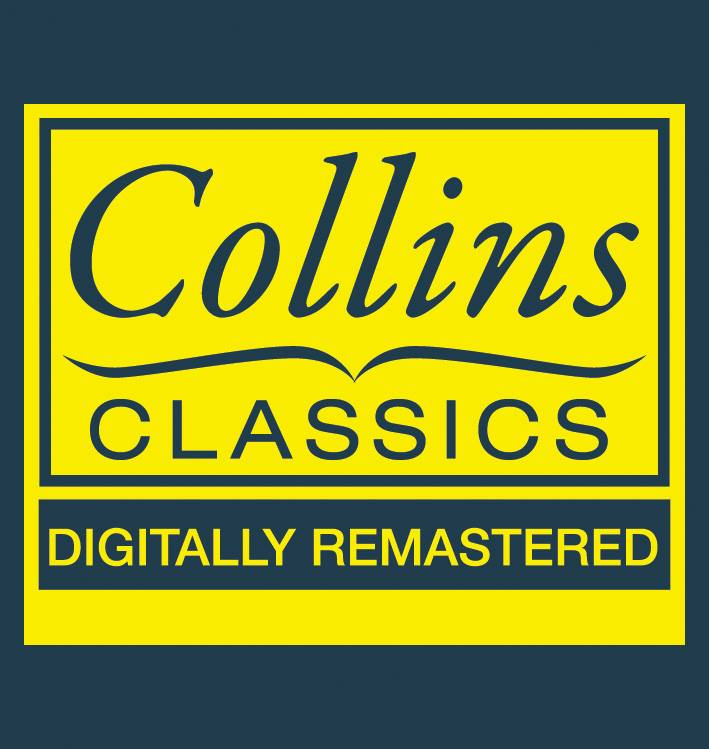
- Parent company: Phoenix Music International
- Founded: 1989
- Genre: Classical
- Country of origin: United Kingdom
- Official website: www.collinsclassics.co.uk

Collins Classics is a record label which specialises in classical music. It was founded in 1989 as a musical subsidiary of HarperCollins Publishers and distributed through Pinnacle Entertainment (United Kingdom).

Artists who recorded for the label include Sir Peter Maxwell Davies, the Duke Quartet, choral group the Sixteen, Harry Christophers and Joanna MacGregor. Collins Classics also recorded over 130 albums with orchestras including the London Philharmonic Orchestra, London Symphony Orchestra, Royal Philharmonic Orchestra, Academy of St Martin in the Fields, Munich Symphony Orchestra and many more.

In 2008 the label was sold to Phoenix Music International Ltd which continue to distribute the Collins Classics label digitally.

== See also ==
- List of record labels
