= Gawain (opera) =

- Opera by Harrison Birtwistle
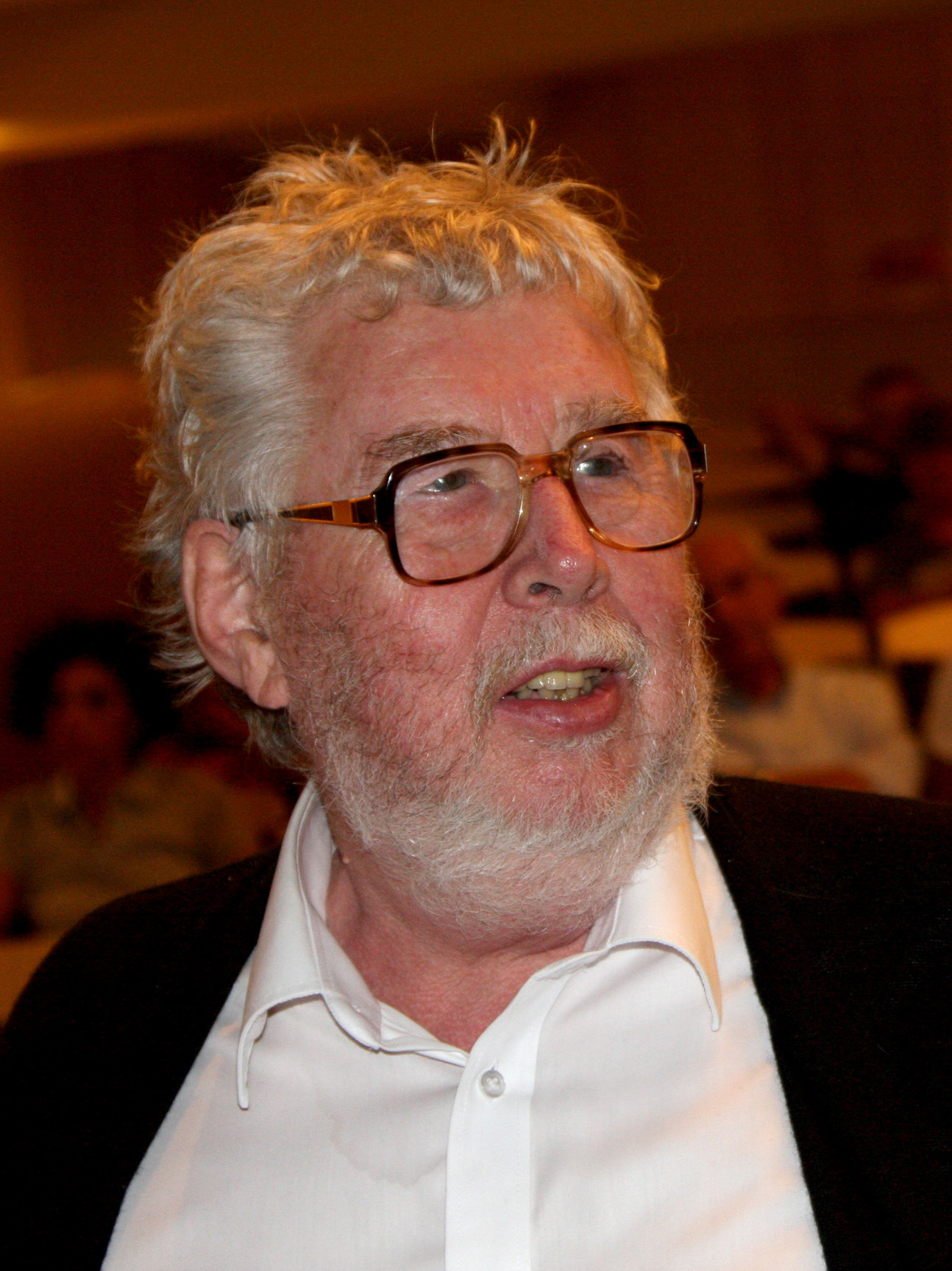
- The composer in 2008
- Librettist: David Harsent
- Language: English
- Based on: Sir Gawain and the Green Knight
- Premiere: 30 May 1991; Royal Opera House, London

Gawain is an opera with music by Harrison Birtwistle to a libretto by David Harsent. The story is based on the Middle English romance Sir Gawain and the Green Knight. The opera was a commission from the Royal Opera House, London, where it was first performed on 30 May 1991. Rhian Samuel has published a detailed analysis of the opera. Birtwistle revised it in 1994, and the premiere of the revised version was given at the Royal Opera House on 20 April 1994.

== Music ==
The plot of Gawain is ideally suited to Birtwistle's approach to musical structure. The repetitious structure of events can be paralleled with a repetitious musical structure. Thus the three hunts in Act 2 use the same musical material, as do the three seductions. The music is varied and adapted every time it is heard, but inner coherence is easily established. The synopsis also indicates many points where recurring motifs are heard: trios of door knocks; the return to the Arthurian court at the end of the opera with the same mood of boredom seen at the beginning; the members of the court gradually recovering from Gawain the items they gave him at the end of act 1. Thus, though the opera is not written with many explicit numbers (i.e. the arias and ensemble pieces characteristic of Classical opera), nor with strongly defined leitmotif in the style of Wagner, there is an overall unity of musical material. There are many occasions when one character will simply repeat one line of text always set it to the same melodic phrase, but this is not the same as using a leitmotif. It does, however, fit well with Birtwistle's standard style of continual variation in the midst of repetition.

The conductor Elgar Howarth has arranged the orchestral suite Gawain's Journey from music in the opera.

== Roles ==
- Morgan Le Fay, King Arthur's half-sister (soprano)
- Lady de Hautdesert, wife of Bertilak (mezzo-soprano)
- Arthur, king (tenor)
- Guinevere, Arthur's wife (soprano)
- A Fool (baritone)
- Agravain, a knight of King Arthur's Court, Gawain's brother
- Ywain, a knight of King Arthur's Court, Gawain's brother
- Gawain, a knight of King Arthur's Court, (baritone)
- Bishop Baldwin (countertenor)
- Bedevere, a knight
- The Green Knight/Bertilak de Hautdesert (bass)

== Synopsis ==
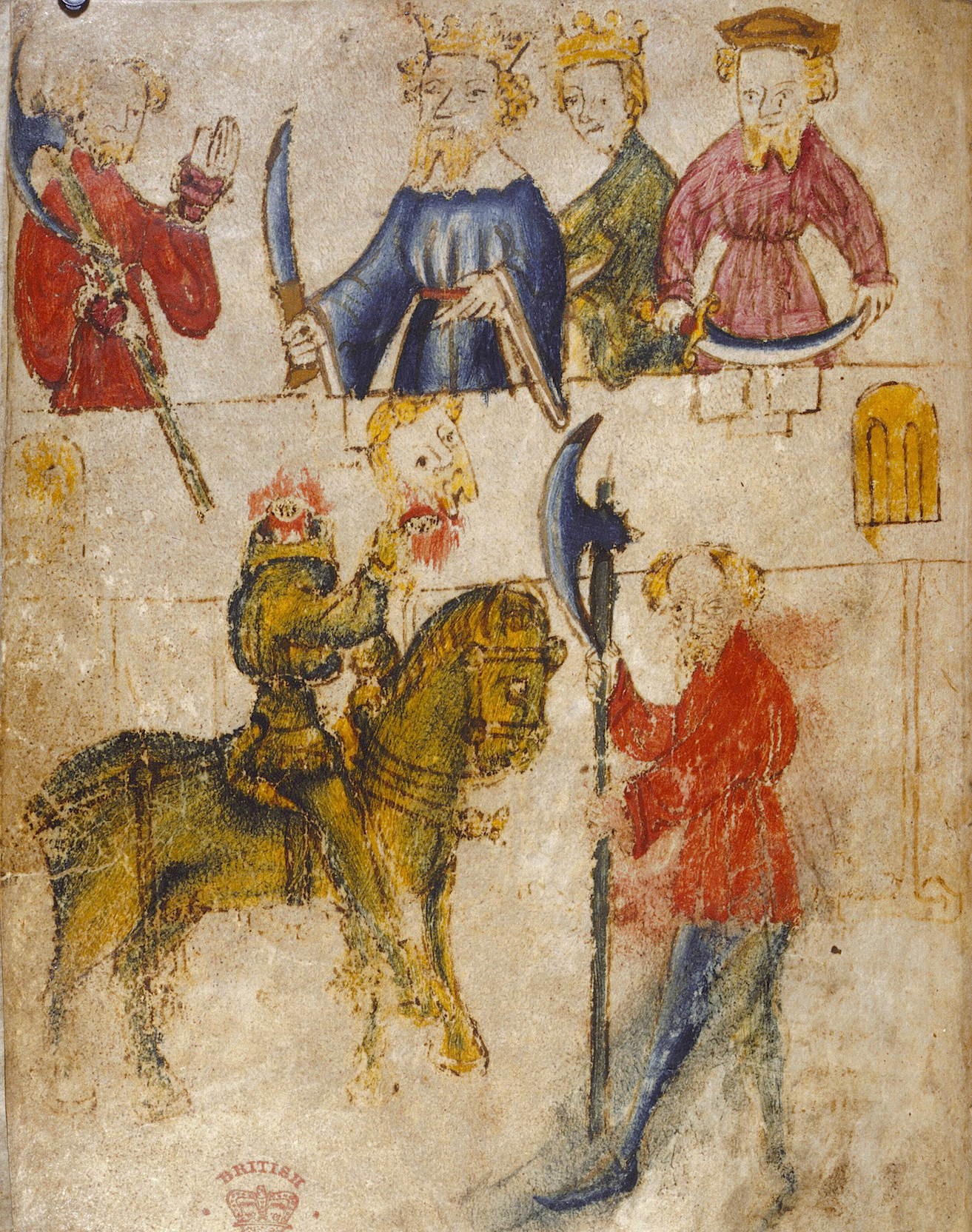
Sir Gawain and the Green Knight

=== Act 1 ===
It is Christmas at Camelot. The knights of Arthur's court, along with the Bishop and the fool, are gathered for the celebration. Also present, but invisible to the rest, are Morgan Le Fay and Lady de Hautdesert, who are conspiring to bring down Arthur.

Arthur is bored, and asks for someone to demonstrate his courage. Instead, the fool posits a series of identity riddles, while Morgan Le Fay promises him entertainment soon enough. There is a knock at the door, but when opened, no one is there. After another riddle, the knock is heard again, and as before the door opens to reveal no one. After the third knock, the doors open to reveal the Green Knight, who rides into the court. The Knight insults Arthur by asking which member of the court is king. Arthur's knights rush to avenge his honour, but the Green Knight rebuffs them. He is not dressed for combat, but offers instead a challenge: he will accept a blow from his axe that will sever his head, on condition that he may inflict an identical blow in a year and a day's time. While the Bishop chants protections from witchcraft, the court is confused. The Knight reiterates on its terms, and declares that he has come in search of a hero, someone brave enough to take up his challenge. He continues to insult Arthur and the court by declaring that they lack the courage. Arthur is about to accept the challenge when Gawain takes the axe. After they agree, the Knight kneels before Gawain.

The present action cuts at this point. When the scene is revealed, it is at the point directly before the Knight's first entrance. The prior action repeats, much compressed and without the discussion. The still unseen Morgan Le Fay and Lady de Hautdesert sing of their plan, focused on provoking Arthur's vanity.

The Knight once again kneels before Gawain, who now decapitates him. Instead of dying, the Knight continues to live. The body picks up the head, which now gives Gawain his instructions on where to come for the return blow. Gawain must travel to the north, to the Green Chapel, the instructions echoing as the Knight rides out of the court. Arthur tries to downplay the event, claiming that it was all a Mummers Play. But the axe has been left, and is hung on the wall for all to see.

The act ends with an abstract representation of the passing of the year. The court prepares Gawain for his travel and ordeal as the seasons pass. He is provided with armour, as the Bishop blesses the venture. Through it all, Morgan Le Fay continues to chant her one line: 'Now with a single step, your journey starts'. (In the first edition of the opera, this passing of the year took over half an hour. The second version substantially reduced that duration. A third version restores it.)

=== Act 2 ===
Scene 1

The act opens with a new vision on Gawain's year of preparation. This time he is alone, taunted by the (still invisible) Morgan Le Fay. This time it is Gawain who has the repeated single line: "Cross of Christ, save me!" He sets off on his journey north.

Scene 2

The scene shifts to the home of Bertilak and Lady de Hautdesert. They await Gawain's arrival, singing lines of text drawn from Morgan Le Fay's taunting. Gawain arrives, but must knock three times before they answer the door. Bertilak and his wife welcome him warmly, pleased to have a guest from Arthur's court for Christmas to teach them genteel court customs. Gawain refuses, saying that he must travel until he finds the Green Chapel. Bertilak informs him that it lies not two miles from where they are already, so that he may rest with his journey almost over.

Gawain is to view everything in Bertilak's home as if it were his own. When he states that his wife will keep Gawain company while he himself is out hunting, Bertilak is struck with jealousy and suspicion. On the verge of revealing the charade, he offers a pact with Gawain. Bertilak will spend each day out hunting, and will give Gawain whatever he has acquired from the day; in return, Gawain is to give Bertilak whatever he has gained. Confused over quite what he could gain, Gawain nevertheless agrees to the pact.

The following day, while her husband is out hunting, Lady de Hautdesert comes to Gawain's private chamber. She attempts to seduce him, and commands him to take her. This puts Gawain in a dilemma, with the conflict between obeying the commands of a lady and not committing adultery. He tries to avoid her pursuit of him, but she finally kisses him. In the meantime, Bertilak kills a stag.

Bertilak returns with his catch, giving it to Gawain. In return, Gawain kisses Bertilak. Bertilak wants to know how Gawain came by such a trophy, but Gawain insists that this was not part of the bargain.

The next day repeats this scenario. Again Gawain is hunted by the lady, who this time kisses him twice; again Bertilak kills his quarry; again Bertilak and Gawain exchange trophies, this time entailing two kisses.

The third day continues much as before. Lady de Hautdesert intensifies her seduction of Gawain, dressing skimpily. Gawain is helpless before her, mutely accepting three kisses from her. Then she offers him the sash around her waist, indicating that while he wears it nothing can possibly harm him. Mindful of his ordeal later that day, Gawain accepts it. Bertilak kills his fox, and returns home. However, at the exchange, Gawain kisses Bertilak three times, but mentions nothing of the sash.

Scene 3

Gawain departs from their home and travels to the Green Chapel. The Green Knight calls Gawain's name from offstage, exactly as he did when he left Camelot a year earlier. Gawain is afraid, but kneels, ready to take the axe blow. However, he ducks away as it comes down. The Knight is angry, demanding to know if it is truly Gawain he is dealing with. Gawain prepares for another swing, but this time the Green Knight stops short. This time it is Gawain that is angry, demanding that the Green Knight keep the pact as agreed.

At the third swing, the knight merely grazes Gawain's neck with a superficial wound. Gawain is angrier still. The Knight explains that his actions have been in response to Gawain's treatment of Bertilak. Twice Gawain was scrupulously honest, but the third time he withheld the sash. The Knight understands that 'fear of death' is what made him lie, but also that this is 'not sin enough to die for'. Gawain is not mollified. He demands the Knight take the sash. But the Knight reties it around Gawain, sending him back to Camelot. Morgan Le Fay removes the enchantment that disguised Bertilak as the Green Knight. Her purpose has been served, for she has revealed the hero for the sham that he is. His real journey is about to begin, as he must come to terms with the 'greed, self-love and cowardice' he has demonstrated.

Scene 4

The scene is Camelot, as at the start of the opera. Arthur again wants to see a display of courage, and the fool responds with riddles. Two knocks at the door initially reveal no one present, until the third time, when Gawain enters, his identity obscured by his great coat and the snow. The court is overjoyed and wants to hear his tale of heroism. Gawain retorts with an insult to Arthur. As the court settles down, consoling themselves that 'all is as it was, with nothing changed', they help Gawain remove the garments they gave him at the end of Act 1 for his journey. But Gawain continues angry with their presumption that he has been victorious. This alienates the court, and the opera closes with Morgan Le Fay singing of the discord she has sown.

The emphasis here is on the flawed hero, revealed to be fearful for his own life and willing to lie and deceive in order to keep it.

== Recording ==
- 1994 revision, recorded live by BBC Radio 3 on 20 April 1994, issued in 1996 by Collins Classics (70412), reissued in 2014 by NMC Recordings (NMC D200): François Le Roux (baritone), Marie Angel (soprano), Anne Howells (mezzo-soprano), Richard Greager (tenor), Penelope Walmsley-Clark (soprano), Omar Ebrahim (baritone), Alan Ewing (bass), John Marsden (tenor), Kevin Smith (countertenor), John Tomlinson (bass-baritone), Royal Opera Chorus, Orchestra of the Royal Opera House, Elgar Howarth (conductor)
