= Elgar Howarth =

English conductor (1935–2025)

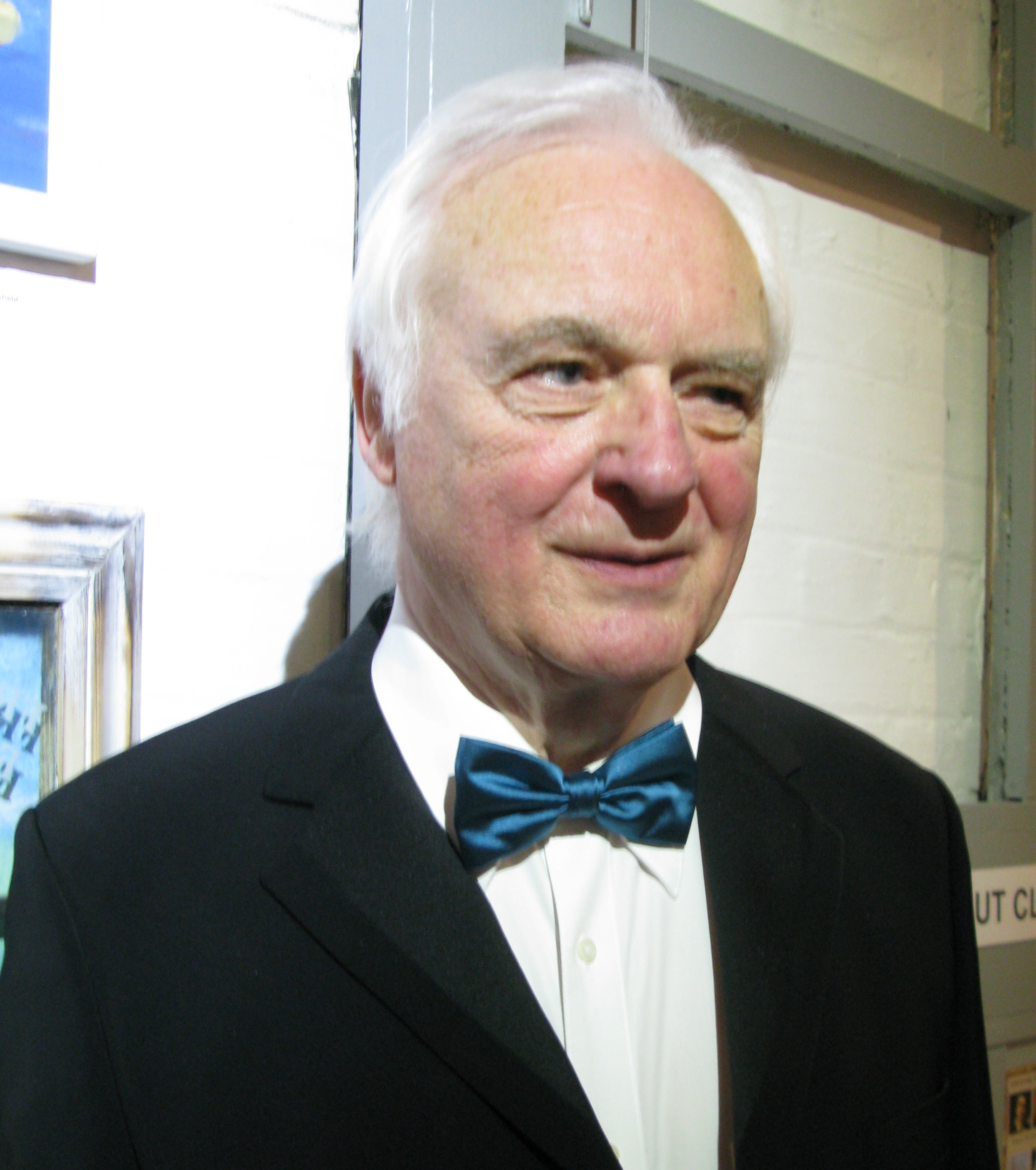
- Howarth in 2012
- Born: 4 November 1935; Cannock, Staffordshire, England
- Died: 13 January 2025 (aged 89)
- Other name: W. Hogarth Lear
- Education: University of Manchester; Royal Manchester College of Music
- Occupations: Conductor; composer; trumpeter
- Organizations: New Music Manchester
- Spouse: Mary Neary (m. 1958; died 2024)
- Children: 3

Elgar Howarth (4 November 1935 – 13 January 2025) was an English conductor, composer and trumpeter. Grove noted that "his performances are marked by powerful concentration and a clear communication of sometimes complex scores".

Howarth's career bridged the worlds of modernist classical music and traditional British brass bands. He conducted many world premieres, including Ligeti's Le Grand Macabre and four operas by Harrison Birtwistle. He composed mainly music for brass instruments and brass bands, some under the pseudonym W. Hogarth Lear. As a player, he was one of the trumpeters who performed with the Beatles on the song "Magical Mystery Tour". The author of a feature article about Howarth in 1999 wrote that "as trumpeter, composer and conductor, he has featured in many of the important musical developments in the UK and beyond over the past 40 years".

== Biography ==
=== Early life and education ===
Howarth was born in Cannock, Staffordshire, on 4 November 1935, the son of Oliver and Emma Howarth. His father was an engineer who also conducted the Barton Hall Works Band, in which Elgar played cornet and his brother Stanford trombone.

Hogarth was educated at the University of Manchester and the Royal Manchester College of Music (RMCM, the predecessor of the Royal Northern College of Music), from 1953–56 where his fellow classmates included the composers Harrison Birtwistle, David Ellis, Alexander Goehr, Peter Maxwell Davies and the pianist John Ogdon. Together they formed New Music Manchester, a group dedicated to the performance of new music.

=== Career ===
After his national service in the Central Band of the Royal Air Force finished in 1958, Howarth immediately began his career in the trumpet section of the Royal Opera orchestra conducted by Rudolf Kempe. He was principal trumpet in the Royal Philharmonic Orchestra from 1964 to 1970, playing also with the Philip Jones Brass Ensemble, the Nash Ensemble and from 1969 as a founding member of the London Sinfonietta. He played the opening bars of Michael Tippett's King Priam at its Coventry premiere in 1962, conducting the whole work years later for English National Opera (ENO). Kempe was his conducting idol, in whom he admired "an incredibly clear beat with the right hand, and the left hand for all the nuance" which he sought to emulate.

Howarth's (unplanned) conducting debut was with the London Sinfonietta on tour in Italy in 1969; his first operatic assignment was for The Rake's Progress for the Royal Northern College of Music at Sadler's Wells in December 1973. Following further work on the concert platform, Ligeti engaged him for the premiere of his Le Grand Macabre at the Royal Swedish Opera in Stockholm in 1978, as well as in Hamburg and Paris. For the British stage premiere of Le Grand Macabre at the London Coliseum in 1982, Howarth wrote an analysis of the text and music for Opera magazine. He later reflected that "no one in Stockholm realized how inexperienced" he was and he didn't tell them. He recalled "I never thought I'd get into opera, because I don't play the piano. I knew I had a natural technical ability, but I was naive about other things... I was never assistant conductor to anybody, so I didn't know how far ahead you had to plan, how many string rehearsals you would need, whether it would be OK for the first oboe not to come to the first rehearsal". He later conducted the premieres of four operas by Harrison Birtwistle: The Mask of Orpheus at the ENO (1986), Yan Tan Tethera for Opera Factory (1986), Gawain at the Royal Opera House (1991) and The Second Mrs Kong at Glyndebourne (1994). He conducted the first performance of Phaeton, a one-act opera by Alan Ridout on Radio 3 in March 1977. Following Le Grand Macabre he made his debut in Gothenburg in 1979 with Peter Grimes and a year later with Australian Opera with Boris Godunov.

He was Principal Guest Conductor of Opera North from 1985 to 1988 where he led the UK premiere of Carl Nielsen's Maskarade in 1990; and the premiere of the Mozart pasticcio The Jewel Box in 1991; he served as music advisor to the company from 2002 to 2004. At Glyndebourne (and on tour with the company) he conducted Rossini's Il Barbiere di Siviglia and Verdi's Falstaff in 1981, Nigel Osborne's The Electrification of the Soviet Union in 1987 and 1988, and Birtwistle's The Second Mrs Kong in 1994 and The Last Supper in 2000 and 2001. In Paris he conducted the premiere of Erzsébet by Charles Chaynes in 1983. Drawing on his connection with Kempe, Howarth conducted several Strauss operas including Die Liebe der Danae, Arabella, Capriccio, Daphne and Die ägyptische Helena.

He first appeared at the Proms in 1970 in a late-night concert of music by Mike Ratledge of the experimental rock band Soft Machine, Terry Riley and Tim Souster. He performed there 23 times until 1989, conducting several UK and world premieres.

As a devoted advocate of contemporary music, Howarth gave the premieres of many instrumental works, including Domination of Black by Robin Holloway (symphonic poem for large orchestra, 1974), Orchestra by Morton Feldman (1976), Inner Light 2 by Jonathan Harvey (singers, 12 players and tape, 1977), La Terre est un homme by Brian Ferneyhough (orchestra, 1979), Invenzioni by Aribert Reimann (for twelve instruments 1979), Nadira by Philippe Capdenat (for soprano, speaker, choir and orchestra, 1983), Waarg by Iannis Xenakis (for thirteen instruments, 1988), Scene by Hans-Jürgen von Bose (for chamber orchestra, 1991), and Tom-a-Bedlam by Detlev Müller-Siemens (voices and chamber orchestra, 1991). Alongside Philip Jones, Howarth played in the "hair-raisingly difficult" premiere of Iain Hamilton's Circus, for 2 trumpets and orchestra given by the London Philharmonic Orchestra in 1969.

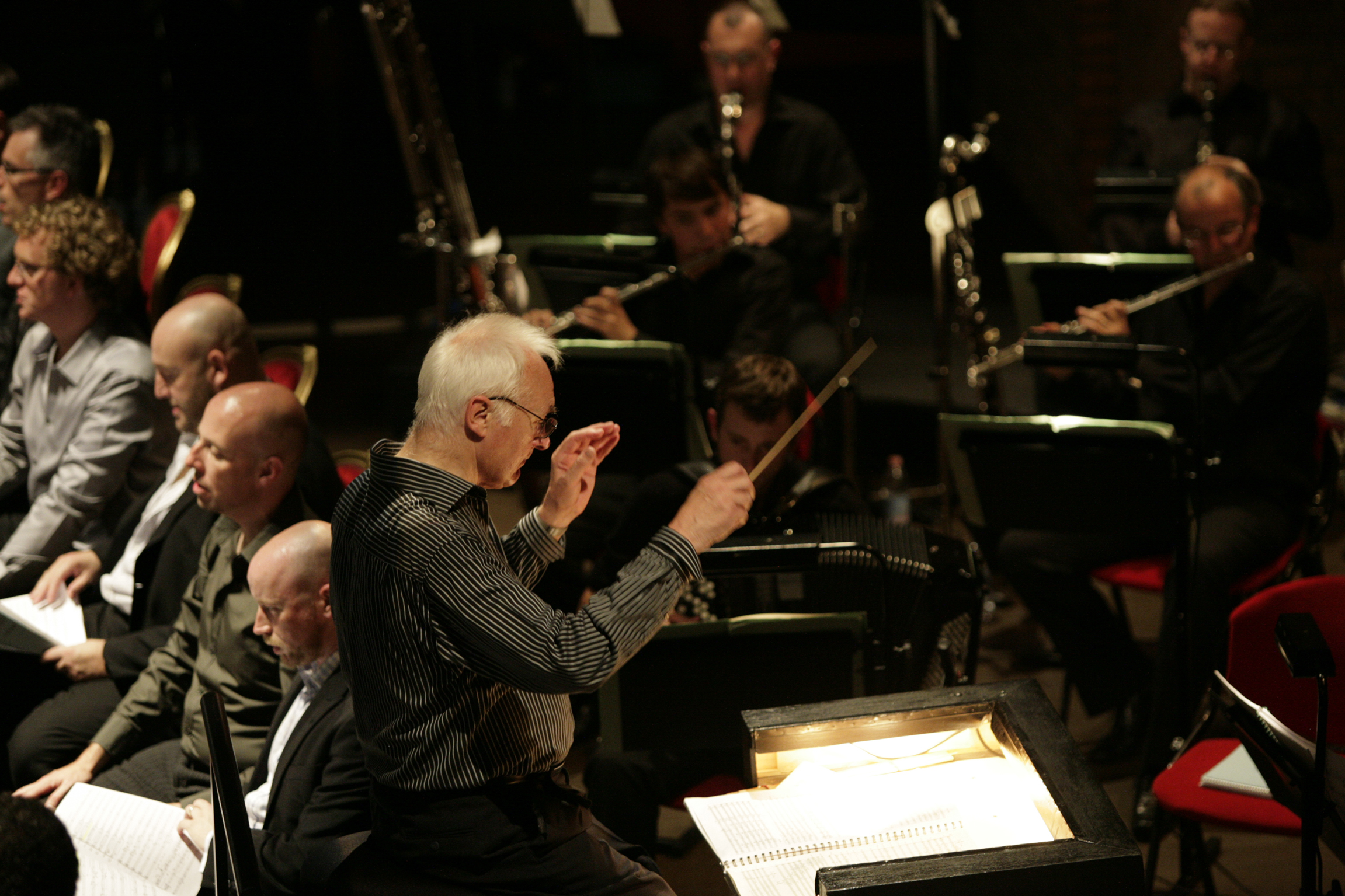
Howarth conducting the London Sinfonietta at the Piccolo Teatro di Milano in 2008

As a composer and former trumpet player, he wrote mainly for brass instruments. Swedish trumpeter Håkan Hardenberger premiered several of his works on cornet, including his Cornet Concerto, Canto, and Capriccio. He wrote arrangements such as Carnival of Venice variations for brass ensemble and Mussorgsky's Pictures at an Exhibition arranged for Philip Jones Brass Ensemble, a group he had both played in and conducted. Composer Roy Newsome remarked that "Howarth's masterly rendition of Mussorgsky's Pictures at an Exhibition (1979) dwarfed all previous transcriptions".

Howarth maintained his interest in brass band music, and made a huge contribution to their modern repertoire. Many of his works were recorded, most notably by the Grimethorpe Colliery Band (as E. Howard) and the Eikanger-Bjørsvik band. He commissioned music for brass band from composers such as Birtwistle, Thea Musgrave and Hans Werner Henze. He also was one of the trumpeters who performed with The Beatles on the song "Magical Mystery Tour". Howarth conducted the soundtrack for Frank Zappa and Tony Palmer's film 200 Motels.

=== Awards and fellowships ===
He became a Fellow of the RMCM in 1970. Howarth won the Walter Willson Cobbett Medal in 1992, presented by The Musicians' Company. In 1997, he won the Olivier Award for Outstanding Achievement in Opera in 1997 for conducting English National Opera’s Die Soldaten and The Prince of Homburg. He was made a Fellow of the Royal College of Music (FRCM) in 2000.

In December 2003, Howarth was revealed to have rejected a CBE.

=== Recordings ===
His discography includes Schoenberg's Pierrot lunaire with Cleo Laine and the Nash Ensemble, and the suite from Stravinsky's The Soldier's Tale, Dumbarton Oaks and Octet for wind in 1974, works by Brian Ferneyhough with the London Sinfonietta in 1978, Copland's Appalachian Spring and Music for Movies with the London Sinfonietta in 1981, music for brass by Paul Hindemith with the Philip Jones Brass Ensemble in 1981, Birtwistle's Gawain with the orchestra and chorus of the Royal Opera House in 1996, which won a Gramophone Award in 1996, and Bliss with the forces of Opera Australia in 2015.

A number of personal copies of works Howarth conducted (some including annotations) were catalogued at the University of East Anglia's School of Music. These were donated in July 2025 to the Library of the Royal Northern College of Music in Manchester, of which Howarth was an alumnus.

=== Personal life and death ===
Howarth married Mary Neary in 1958; they had three children. They moved from London to Beccles, Suffolk. Neary died in 2024. With his son Patrick, Howarth wrote a book "which explains the brass band world", with chapters on the repertoire, and interviews with among others Derek Bourgeois and Major Peter Parkes.

Howarth died from complications of dementia on 13 January 2025, aged 89.

Cultural offices
Preceded by Paul Daniel (Music Director)	Music Advisor, Opera North; 1997–1999	Succeeded by Steven Sloane (Music Director)
