= Harrison Birtwistle =

English composer (1934–2022)

Sir Harrison Birtwistle CH
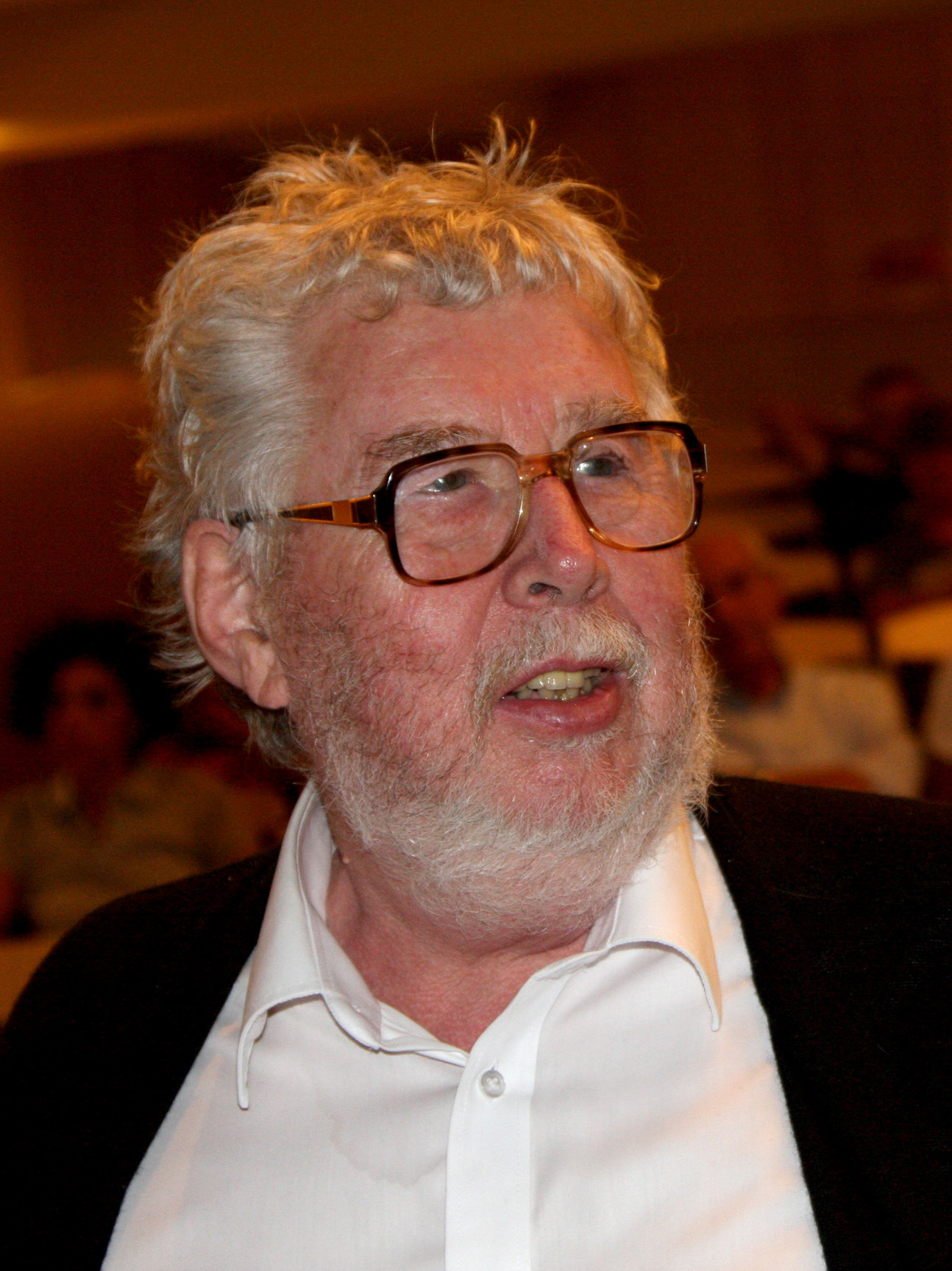
- Birtwistle in Turin, 2008
- Born: 15 July 1934; Accrington, Lancashire, England
- Died: 18 April 2022 (aged 87); Mere, Wiltshire, England
- Education: Royal Manchester College of Music
- Era: Contemporary
- Works: List of compositions
- Spouse: Sheila Duff (m. 1958; died 2012)
- Children: 3, including Adam and Silas

Sir Harrison Birtwistle (15 July 1934 – 18 April 2022) was an English composer of contemporary classical music best known for his operas, often based on mythological subjects. Among his many compositions, his better known works include The Triumph of Time (1972) and the operas The Mask of Orpheus (1986), Gawain (1991), and The Minotaur (2008). The last of these was ranked by music critics at The Guardian in 2019 as the third-best piece of the 21st century. Even his compositions that were not written for the stage often showed a theatrical approach. A performance of his saxophone concerto Panic during the BBC's Last Night of the Proms caused "national notoriety". He received many international awards and honorary degrees.

== Life and career ==
=== Early life ===
Harrison Birtwistle was born in Accrington, a mill town in Lancashire around 20 miles north of Manchester. (Note: Regarding his name, Birtwistle stated that "in some reference books my name is down as Harrison Paul, which it isn't, and never has been. I don't have a second name." Many people close to Birtwistle knew him as "Harry" or "Harri".) His parents, Fred and Madge Birtwistle, ran a bakery, and his interest in music was encouraged by his mother. She bought him a clarinet when he was seven and arranged for him to have lessons with the local bandmaster. He attended Accrington Grammar School. Much of his youth was spent roaming the countryside near his home, and his frustration with the disruption of the nature by modern technology would affect his later work profoundly. Other youthful activities included the construction of amateur theatrical sets, and the subsequent imagining of dramas taking place inside them. Birtwistle became proficient enough to play in the local military-style band and also played in the orchestra that accompanied Gilbert and Sullivan productions and the local choral society's performances of Handel's Messiah. From around this time Birtwistle first composed, later describing his early pieces as "sub-Vaughan Williams".

In 1952 he entered the Royal Manchester College of Music in Manchester on a clarinet scholarship. While there he came in contact with contemporaries including Peter Maxwell Davies, Alexander Goehr, the pianist John Ogdon, and the trumpeter Elgar Howarth. Between 1955 and 1957 he completed national service in the Royal Artillery (Plymouth) Band, based in Oswestry.

=== Composing career ===
Birtwistle served as director of music at Cranborne Chase School from 1962 until 1965, before continuing his studies at Princeton University on a Harkness Fellowship, where he completed the opera Punch and Judy to a libretto by Stephen Pruslin. It was premiered at the Aldeburgh Festival; Benjamin Britten is said to have left during intermission. This work, together with Verses for Ensembles and The Triumph of Time, led to greater exposure for Birtwistle in the classical music world. The orchestral work The Triumph of Time, inspired by a woodcut by Pieter Bruegel, premiered in 1972.

In 1972, he wrote the music to the film The Offence, starring Sean Connery, his only film score. In 1975, he became musical director of the newly established Royal National Theatre in London, a post he held until 1983. He received a knighthood (1988) and was made a Member of the Order of the Companions of Honour (2001). From 1994 to 2001 he was Henry Purcell Professor of Composition at King's College London. Birtwistle was the 1987 recipient of the University of Louisville Grawemeyer Award for Music Composition for his epic opera The Mask of Orpheus.

Though well-established in the classical music world, Birtwistle was relatively unknown to the general public until the mid-1990s, when two events increased his profile with the wider audience. In 1994 two anti-modernist musicians, Frederick Stocken and Keith Burstein, calling themselves "The Hecklers", organised a demonstration at the first night of a revival of his opera Gawain at the Royal Opera House, London. The following year, Birtwistle's saxophone concertante work Panic was premiered in the second half of the Last Night of the Proms, as the first piece of contemporary music ever, to an estimated worldwide television audience of 100 million. According to the Daily Telegraph, it met with incomprehension from many viewers.

In 1995, he was awarded the Ernst von Siemens Music Prize. At the 2006 Ivor Novello Awards he criticised pop musicians at the event for performing too loudly and using too many clichés.

Among the musicians who performed his works are conductors Pierre Boulez, Sir Andrew Davis, Daniel Barenboim, Christoph von Dohnányi, Oliver Knussen and Simon Rattle, violinist Christian Tetzlaff, the soloist in the world premiere of his violin concerto in 2011, and pianist Pierre-Laurent Aimard, the soloist in the first performance of his Responses for piano and orchestra in 2014.

=== Private life ===
Birtwistle had a low media profile, but occasionally gave interviews. In 2019, he was interviewed for Composer of the Week on BBC Radio 3. He married Sheila Duff, a singer, in 1958. The couple had three sons, two of whom, Adam and Silas, are artists. Sheila died in 2012.

Birtwistle had a stroke in 2021 and died at his home in Mere, Wiltshire, on 18 April 2022, aged 87.

== Music ==
=== Style ===
Birtwistle's music is not categorised as belonging to any particular school or movement. For a time, he was described as belonging to the Manchester School, a phrase invented as a parallel to the Second Viennese School to refer to Birtwistle, Goehr, and Davies. Birtwistle's music is complex, written in a modernistic manner with a clear, distinctive voice, with sounds described as of "sonic brashness".

His early work is sometimes evocative of Igor Stravinsky and Olivier Messiaen, whom he acknowledged as influences, and his technique of juxtaposing blocks of sound is sometimes compared to that of Edgard Varèse. Hearing the work of Boulez (Le Marteau sans maître) and Stockhausen (Zeitmaße and Gruppen) in his youth was also inspirational, with that of the latter composer in particular influencing his wind quintet, Refrains and Choruses (1957). His early pieces made frequent use of ostinati and often had a ritualistic feel. These were toned down in Birtwistle's later decades as his compositional style developed.

Even when not creating a visual piece involving stage action, Birtwistle's musical output remained frequently theatrical in conception. The music does not follow the logic and rules of classical forms such as sonata form, but is structured more like a drama. Furthermore, different musical instruments can almost be seen to take the part of different characters in the drama. This is especially apparent in a performance of Secret Theatre (1984). For various portions of the piece, a number of the instrumentalists perform in a soloist capacity. For this, they leave their seat in the ensemble and stand separately, to one side of the ensemble, returning to the group when they are no longer given that role.

=== Works ===
==== Opera ====
- Punch and Judy (1966–1967)
- The Mask of Orpheus (1973–84)
- Gawain (1990)
- The Second Mrs Kong (1993–94)
- The Last Supper (2000)
- The Minotaur (2008)
- The Corridor, chamber opera (2009)
- The Cure (2014–15)

==== Other music ====
- Refrains and Choruses (1957), wind quintet
- The Triumph of Time (1971–72), orchestra
- Silbury Air (1976–77), chamber orchestra
- Secret Theatre (1984), chamber ensemble
- Panic (1995), alto saxophone, jazz drum kit and orchestra
- Theseus Game (2002), large ensemble with two conductors (2002)
- In Broken Images (2011), large ensemble (after the antiphonal music of Gabrieli)
- Songs from the Same Earth (2012–13), tenor and piano
- Responses (2013–14), piano concerto
- Deep Time (2016), orchestra

== Honours and awards ==
- 1986 Grawemeyer Award for Music Composition, University of Louisville
- 1986 Chevalier de l'Ordre des Arts et des Lettres, Ministry of Culture, France
- 1988 Knight Bachelor (Kt), Monarchy of the United Kingdom in the 1988 Queen's Birthday Honours List
- 1989 Fellowship, Royal Northern College of Music (FRNCM).
- 1994 Honorary Fellow, Royal Academy of Arts
- 1995 Ernst von Siemens Music Prize
- 2001 Member of the Order of the Companions of Honour (CH), Monarchy of the United Kingdom in the 2001 New Years Honours List
- 2003 Royal Philharmonic Society Music Awards Large-scale Composition in London
- 2004 First Roche Commission
- 2007 Foreign Honorary Member, American Academy of Arts and Letters
- 2015 Wihuri Sibelius Prize

Honorary degrees

- 1994 University of Sussex, Doctor of Music (D.Mus.)
- 1996 City, University of London, D.Mus.
- 2008 University of London, D.Mus.
- 2010 University of Cambridge, D.Mus.
- 2013 Bath Spa University, Doctorate
- 2014 University of Oxford, D.Mus.
- 2014 Edge Hill University, Doctor of Philosophy (PhD)
