= Rebecca Caine =

Canadian soprano

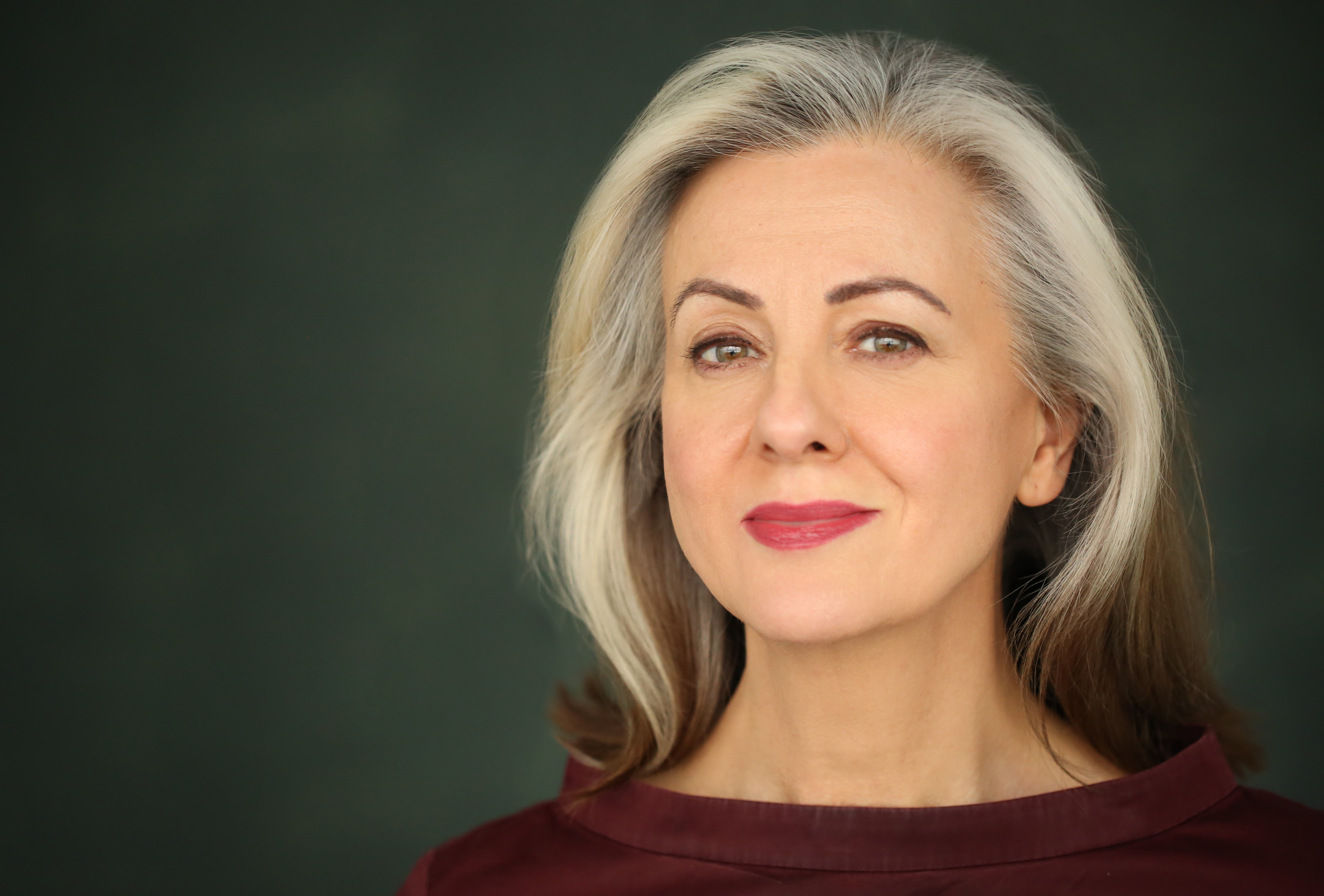
- Rebecca Caine in 2020
- Born: November 25, 1959 (age 66); Toronto, Canada
- Education: Guildhall School
- Occupations: Actress; Singer
- Years active: 1980–present
- Spouse: Tim Richards (m. 1993)
- Website: www.rebeccacaine.com

Rebecca Caine (born 25 November 1959) is a Canadian light lyric soprano, and musical theatre performer.

== Life and career ==
Caine was born in Toronto, Ontario and studied at the Guildhall School of Music and Drama in London. She is the daughter of Australian statistician Geoffrey Watson and the granddaughter of British constitutional law scholar Sir William Ivor Jennings. Caine currently resides in London.

Caine's career has been divided between opera and musical theatre. She made her West End debut at the age of 19 in the role of Laurey in Oklahoma!. She then sang the role of Eliza in My Fair Lady on a national tour. While making her debut at Glyndebourne as Amor in L'incoronazione di Poppea, she was asked to join the Royal Shakespeare Company where she created the role of Cosette in Les Misérables.

After a successful West End run, she joined the original cast of The Phantom of the Opera to play Christine opposite Michael Crawford as alternate (performing 2 shows a week) when original Christine Sarah Brightman left the show and was replaced by the original alternate, Claire Moore.

When the rights to a Canadian production of Phantom were secured, producer Garth Drabinsky aggressively pursued Caine to reprise the role in Toronto. Andrew Lloyd Webber, who greatly admired Caine's portrayal of Christine in the London production, also strongly suggested she take the role. At the time, Caine was very close to signing a contract to star in another West End show. Ultimately, she chose Phantom and relocated to Toronto and also spent time in New York in early 1989 for principal cast rehearsals with director Hal Prince.

The Canadian production of The Phantom of the Opera premiered on September 20, 1989, at the restored Pantages Theatre, with Susan Cuthbert playing Christine two performances per week as Caine's alternate. The show broke then box office records for advance ticket sales, and ran for just over ten years. During her run in Toronto, she joined the Canadian Opera Company to make her North American operatic debut in the title role of Alban Berg's Lulu. This led to offers from numerous international opera companies ranging from Claudio Monteverdi to Peter Maxwell Davies, including Pamina, Despina, Susanna, Aminta (Il re pastore), Vixen, Michaela, Musetta, Ophelie, Leila, Marguerite, Violetta, Julietta (Bohuslav Martinů) and Adina for companies such as the Canadian Opera Company, Scottish Opera, English National Opera, Glimmerglass Opera, Spoleto Festival, Opéra de Nice, Vlaamse Opera, New Zealand Opera, National Theatre of Prague, and Opera North. In 2006 she performed as Hanna Glawari in Franz Lehár's The Merry Widow for Opera Holland Park in London in 2006.

In 1996, Caine made a guest appearance on The Future Sound of London's album Dead Cities, performing operatic vocals on the song "Everyone in the World Is Doing Something Without Me".

On October 7, 2006, Caine reunited with her former cast colleagues from the original London production of Les Misérables to sing "One Day More" after a performance in celebration of the show's 21st anniversary making it the longest running musical in the world. The original cast reunited again in 2010 to celebrate the show's 25th anniversary at the O2 Arena in London.

In May 2009, Caine made her Chicago debut in the Chicago Opera Theater's production of Benjamin Britten's Owen Wingrave.

In December 2010, Caine returned to the musical theatre stage as Lady Raeburn in Salad Days produced by Tête à Tête.

In May 2011, Caine played Ottavia in a jazz adaptation of The Coronation of Poppea directed by Mark Ravenhill.

In the summer of 2012, Caine played Baroness Elsa Schraeder in the Sound of Music at the Kilworth House Theatre in Leicestershire. The production also featured Helena Blackman as Maria and Jan Hartley as Mother Abbess.

In March 2013, Caine played Lady Vale in Darling of the Day at the Union Theatre, London, marking the show's UK premiere after an initial 31-performance run on Broadway over four decades previously in 1968.

From November 2014-January 2015, Caine played Katisha in The Mikado at London's Charing Cross Theatre.

In December 2015-February 2016, Caine joined the Asolo Repertory Theatre Company in Sarasota, Florida making her straight acting debut as Raquel De Angellis in Living On Love.

In April 2015, Caine appeared as the Mother Abbess in a production of The Sound of Music in Lebanon. The following year she performed the role in a UK tour of the show from July–September 2016.

Caine appeared at the Sheffield Crucible in the world premiere of the new musical Flowers for Mrs Harris in the role of Lady Dant/Mme. Colbert from May to June 2016.

In addition to her work with opera and theatre companies, Caine continues to perform concerts and solo cabaret performances throughout Britain and North America. Caine has also taught for multiple years at Trinity Laban Conservatoire of Music and Dance in Greenwich.

Caine made her second appearance in a play from February–March 2018 as Mrs Chasen in Harold and Maude, alongside Sheila Hancock and later Linda Marlowe as Maude, at Charing Cross Theatre.

Caine returned to the role of Mother Abbess in The Sound of Music between December 2018-January 2019 at the Pattihio Theatre and Strovolos Municipal Theatre in Cyprus.

From September–October 2019, Caine appeared in the UK premiere of Preludes by Dave Malloy as hypnotherapist Nikolai Dahl at Southwark Playhouse. The cast later reunited in May 2021 for two livestreamed concert performances of the production from the same venue.

During the COVID-19 pandemic, Caine taught independently and also appeared in standalone concerts such as A Merry Little Christmas Celebration at Chichester Festival Theatre in December 2020.

In November 2021, Caine appeared in the 10th Anniversary Concert of Howard Goodall and Stephen Clark's musical Love Story alongside the show's original performers, Michael D Xavier and Emma Williams.

From November 2018, Caine has been involved in the development of Conor Mitchell's opera Abomination: A DUP Opera with the Belfast Ensemble as British politician, Iris Robinson. A full staging of the show was mounted in November 2019 at Outburst Queer Arts Festival at the Lyric Theatre in Belfast, where it was filmed and subsequently streamed to worldwide audiences in April 2020. Caine reunited with the ensemble from March–April 2022 to perform the opera at Ireland's national theatre, the Abbey Theatre, and then again at the Lyric Theatre in Belfast.

Caine performed the role of Margaret Johnson in The Light in the Piazza at Central City Opera in Colorado from 2–28 July in 2022.

Between 8 October-5 November, Caine premiered the role of Magda in Propaganda: A New Musical at the Lyric Theatre as part of the 2022 Belfast International Arts Festival. The new work, devised and directed by Conor Mitchell in a co-production between the Lyric Theatre and the Belfast Ensemble, is set during the Cold War in 1949 in East Berlin and described as a "Soviet love story…embroiled in the chaos of circumstance, art, love and American jazz". Earlier initial development of the piece included a concert reading in April 2019 at the Lyric, under the title ‘The Young Pornographers’.

=== Leading Ladies ===
In May 2007, Caine released Leading Ladies, a collection of songs paying tribute to past "Leading Ladies of the British Musical Theatre Stage", from Gertrude Lawrence to Julie Andrews, with her then-collaborator and vocal coach Gerald Martin Moore on piano and vocals, playing a selection of their leading men, including Noël Coward.

They created two cabaret shows based on their Leading Ladies concept (the second show is entitled Leading Ladies of Hollywood) and have performed for sold-out crowds throughout the United Kingdom in venues such as the Jermyn Street Theatre in London and the Newbury Festival in Sydmonton.

=== World premieres ===
Caine's world premieres have included: Jezebel, presented by the Toronto Symphony (title role; oratorio by Robertson Davies and Derek Holman); Playing Away, presented by Opera North (role: L.A. Lola; by Howard Brenton and Benedict Mason); The Golden Ass, presented by the Canadian Opera Company (role: Fotis; by Robertson Davies and Randolph Peters); Mr Emmet Takes a Walk, presented by Psappha (6 female roles; by David Pountney and Peter Maxwell Davies); Mathilde, a musical by Conor Mitchell directed by Simon Callow (Edinburgh Fringe Festival); Intolerance, a one-woman opera by Mark Ravenhill and Conor Mitchell presented by Tête-à-Tête.

== Performance Credits ==
=== Musicals ===
Show	Role	Date	Company, theatre, city, notes	Ref
Oklahoma!	Laurey	August–September 1981	The Palace Theatre, London	
My Fair Lady	Eliza Doolittle	December 1981-February 1982 April 1982	UK National Tour Royal Alexandra Theatre, Toronto (North American Musical Debut)	
Perchance to Dream	Melinda, Melanie and Melody	Winter 1983	UK Tour	
Les Misérables	Cosette	October–December 1985 December 1985 – 1987	Royal Shakespeare Company, The Barbican, London The Palace Theatre, London	
The Phantom of the Opera	Christine Daaé (alternate) (principal)	April 1987-March 1988 September 1989-February 1992	Her Majesty's Theatre, London The Pantages Theatre, Toronto	
Of Thee I Sing	Mary Turner	July 1996	Atlanta Opera, Atlanta	
Salad Days	Lady Raeburn	January–February 2011	Riverside Studios, London	
Darling of the Day	Lady Vale	March–April 2012	Union Theatre, London	
The Sound of Music	Elsa Schraeder	August–September 2012	Kilworth House Theatre, Leicestershire	
The Sound of Music	Mother Abbess	April 2015 July–September 2016 December 2018-January 2019	Beirut, Lebanon UK Tour Cyprus	
Flowers for Mrs Harris	Lady Dant / Madame Colbert	May–June 2016	Sheffield Crucible Theatre, Sheffield	
Preludes	Dahl	September–October 2019 May 2021	Southwark Playhouse, London Streamed performances from Southwark Playhouse, London	
Love Story	Mrs Barrett	28 November 2021	10th Anniversary concert, Cadogan Hall, London	
The Light in the Piazza	Margaret Johnson	June–July 2022	Central City Opera, Colorado	
Propaganda: A New Musical	Magda	Oct–Nov 2022	Lyric Theatre, Belfast – world premiere by Conor Mitchell	
Carousel	Nettie Fowler	July 2024	Royal Festival Hall	

=== Opera ===
Show	Role	Date	Company, theatre, city, notes	Ref
Lulu	Lulu	April 1991	Canadian Opera Company (COC), Toronto	
The Magic Flute	Pamina	July 1992 September–December 1993 October–November 1994 April 1995	Glimmerglass Opera, New York – American operatic debut Canadian Opera Company (COC), Toronto English National Opera (ENO), London – English operatic debut Madison Opera, Wisconsin	
Così fan tutte	Despina	November 1992 November 2001-May 2002 December 2002	Canadian Opera Company (COC), Toronto Scottish Opera Company, Scotland and Brighton Festival Vlaamse Opera, Antwerp	
Fidelio	Marzelline	February–March 1993	Tulsa Opera, Oklahoma	
The Barber of Seville	Rosina	May 1993	Tulsa Opera, Oklahoma	
Jezebel	Jezebel	June 1993	The Joy of Singing Festival, Toronto – world premiere by Robertson Davies and Derek Holman	
Carmen	Micaela	September–October 1993	Canadian Opera Company (COC), Toronto	
Playing Away	LA Lola	June–July 1994	Opera North, Leeds then North UK Tour – world premiere by Howard Brenton and Benedict Mason	
Rigoletto	Gilda	September 1994	Opera Lyra Ottawa (OLO), Ottawa	
L'incontro improvviso	Balkis	June 1995	Opéra de Nice, Nice	
Hamlet	Ophelia	September 1995 - February 1996	Opera North, Leeds then North UK Tour	
La Boheme	Musetta	June 1996 June–July 2001	English National Opera (ENO), London Vlaamse Opera, Antwerp	
La Traviata	Violetta	July–September 1996	Opera Northern Ireland (ONI), Belfast	
The Marriage of Figaro	Susanna	February 1997	English National Opera (ENO), London	
Faust	Marguerite	June 1997	New Jersey Opera Festival, New Jersey	
Julietta	Julietta	October–November 1997 March 2000 March–April 2003 July 2005	Opera North, Leeds and North UK Tour Národní Divadlo Prague Opera, Prague Opera North, Leeds and North UK Tour Ravenna Festival, Italy	
Cunning Little Vixen	Sharp-Ears, the Vixen	January–February 1998 June–July 1998	Canadian Opera Company (COC), Toronto Spoleto Festival, Italy	
Il re pastore	Aminta	September–October 1998	Opera North, Leeds then North UK Tour	
The Golden Ass	Fotis	April 1999	Canadian Opera Company (COC), Toronto – world premiere by Robertson Davies & Randolph Peters	
Figaro’s Wedding	Susanna	October 1999	English National Opera (ENO), London	
Mr. Emmet Takes a Walk	6 Female Roles with Psappha	June–July 2000	St Magnus Festival, Orkney, Scotland	
The Pearlfishers	Princess Leila	June 2002	Minnesota Opera, Atlanta	
The Elixir of Love	Adina	March 2004	NBR New Zealand Opera, New Zealand	
The Seven Deadly Sins	Anna 1	May–June 2004	Opera North, Leeds then UK Tour	
The Merry Widow	Hanna Glawari	July 2006	Opera Holland Park, London	
Owen Wingrave	Mrs Coyle	May 2009	Chicago Opera Theatre, Chicago	
Intolerance	Helen	August 2010	Tête à Tête opera festival, London – world premiere by Conor Mitchell	
The Coronation of Poppea	Ottavia	April–May 2011	King's Head Theatre, London	
The Mikado	Katisha	December 2014-January 2015	Charing Cross Theatre, London	
Abomination: A DUP Opera	Iris Robinson	17 November 2018 November 2019 April 2020 March–April 2022	Concert with the Belfast Ensemble, Belfast – world premiere by Conor Mitchell The Belfast Ensemble, Outburst Queer Arts Festival, Lyric Theatre, Belfast Streamed proshot from the Lyric Theatre, Belfast The Belfast Ensemble, Abbey Theatre, Dublin and Lyric Theatre, Belfast	

=== Plays ===
Show	Role	Date	Company, theatre, city and notes	Ref
Living on Love	La Diva/Raquel DeAngelis	January–February 2016	Asolo Repertory Theatre, Florida – straight acting debut	
Harold and Maude	Mrs Chasen	February–March 2018	Charing Cross Theatre, London	

== Recordings ==
Caine can be heard on numerous recordings including:

- Les Misérables – Original London Cast – 1985
- Anything Goes – London Studio Cast – 1988 (EMI)
- The Phantom of the Opera – Original Canadian Cast – 1990
- Everyone In The World Is Doing Something Without Me (Featured on Dead Cities by The Future Sound of London) – 1996
- Babes in Toyland – 2001 (Unreleased)
- Mr. Emmet Takes a Walk – 2007
- Leading Ladies – 2007 (Solo debut album with Gerald Martin Moore)
- As Time Goes By (Featured on Dream by Anna O’Byrne) – 2016
- Preludes – 2021 (Concert Pro-shot from Southwark Playhouse)

== Broadcasts ==
Caine's BBC broadcasts include:

Broadcast	Date	Notes	Ref
Imeneo	29 Apr 1984	BBCR3. Broadcast of Handel's Imeneo by the Handel Opera Society from Sadler's Wells Theatre in London, sung in an English translation by Robert Farncombe, conducted by Charles Farncombe. Cast members included: Penelope Walker, Neil Jansen, Richard Jackson, Rebecca Caine, and Marilyn Hill Smith.	
Playing Away	14 Jun 1994	BBCR3. The first broadcast performance of a new opera with music by Benedict Mason and text by Howard Brenton, given by Opera North at the Grand Theatre, Leeds.	
One Touch of Venus	3 Apr 1995	BBCR3. As a prelude to Radio 3's Kurt Weill Weekend, John McGlinn conducts the BBC Singers and the BBC Concert Orchestra in a production of Weill's 1943 musical One Touch of Venus, a humorous indictment of the suburban American Dream. The production features previously neglected numbers.	
Candide	27 Mar 1996	BBCR3. Concert version of Leonard Bernstein's theatre-piece based on Hugh Wheeler's adaptation of Voltaire's satirical work, recorded at The Hippodrome, Golders Green.	
Trouble in Tahiti and The Telephone	30 Apr 1997	BBCR3. A double bill of American opera from the forties and fifties with works by Bernstein and Menotti, recorded in the BBC Broadcasting House Radio Theatre with the BBC Concert Orchestra.	
Side by Side by... Leonard Bernstein	3 Jun 1998	BBCR3. A celebration of the stage works of Leonard Bernstein, presented from the stage of The Palace Theatre, London, featuring excerpts from Candide, On The Town, Trouble in Tahiti, West Side Story, Wonderful Town and 1600 Pennsylvania Avenue.	
Side by Side by... Cole Porter	10 Jun 1998	BBCR3. A celebration of the stage works of Cole Porter with the BBC Singers and the BBC Concert Orchestra, conducted by John McGlinn, with music including: Let's Do It (Paris), Night and Day (Gay Divorce), Miss Otis Regrets (Hi Diddle Diddle), Blow, Gabriel, Blow (Anything Goes), Begin the Beguine (Jubilee), Where Is the Life That Late I Led? (Kiss Me Kate) and I Love Paris (Can-Can).	
Side by Side by... Jerome Kern	23 Dec 1999	BBCR3. A celebration of the musicals of Jerome Kern with the Maida Vale Singers and BBC Concert Orchestra at the Peacock Theatre in London as part of the BOC Covent Garden Festival, featuring music including: Bill (Oh, Lady, Lady), Look For The Silver Lining (Sally), The Bullfrog Patrol (She’s a Good Fellow), Make Believe (Show Boat), Smoke Gets in Your Eyes (Roberta), The Way You Look Tonight (Swing Time) and All the Things You Are (Very Warm for May).	
Julietta	26 Apr 2003	BBCR3. Martinu's surrealist opera Julietta (The Book of Dreams) in David Pountney's new English translation and production for Opera North, from the Grand Theatre, Leeds.	
The Seven Deadly Sins	30 May 2004	BBCR3. The last two of Opera North's ‘Eight Little Greats’ from the company's festival of one act operas put on to celebrate their 25th anniversary, at the Grand Theatre in Leeds.	
Friday Night Is Music Night	28 Dec 2007 8 Aug 2008	BBCR2. Jerry Herman Gala. Aled Jones recalls the best live performances of the past year, including Juan Diego Florez, Andrea Bocelli, the Band of the Grenadire Guards, Nancy Griffith, Joe Stilgoe, Rebecca Caine, Jonathan Gunthorpe, David Childs and Ailish Tynan. BBCR2. Ken Bruce introduces Barry Wordsworth conducting the BBC Concert Orchestra at Watford Colosseum, with guest singers soprano Rebecca Caine and baritone Graeme Danby.	
