= Kommilitonen! =

2011 opera by Peter Maxwell Davies

- Opera by Peter Maxwell Davies
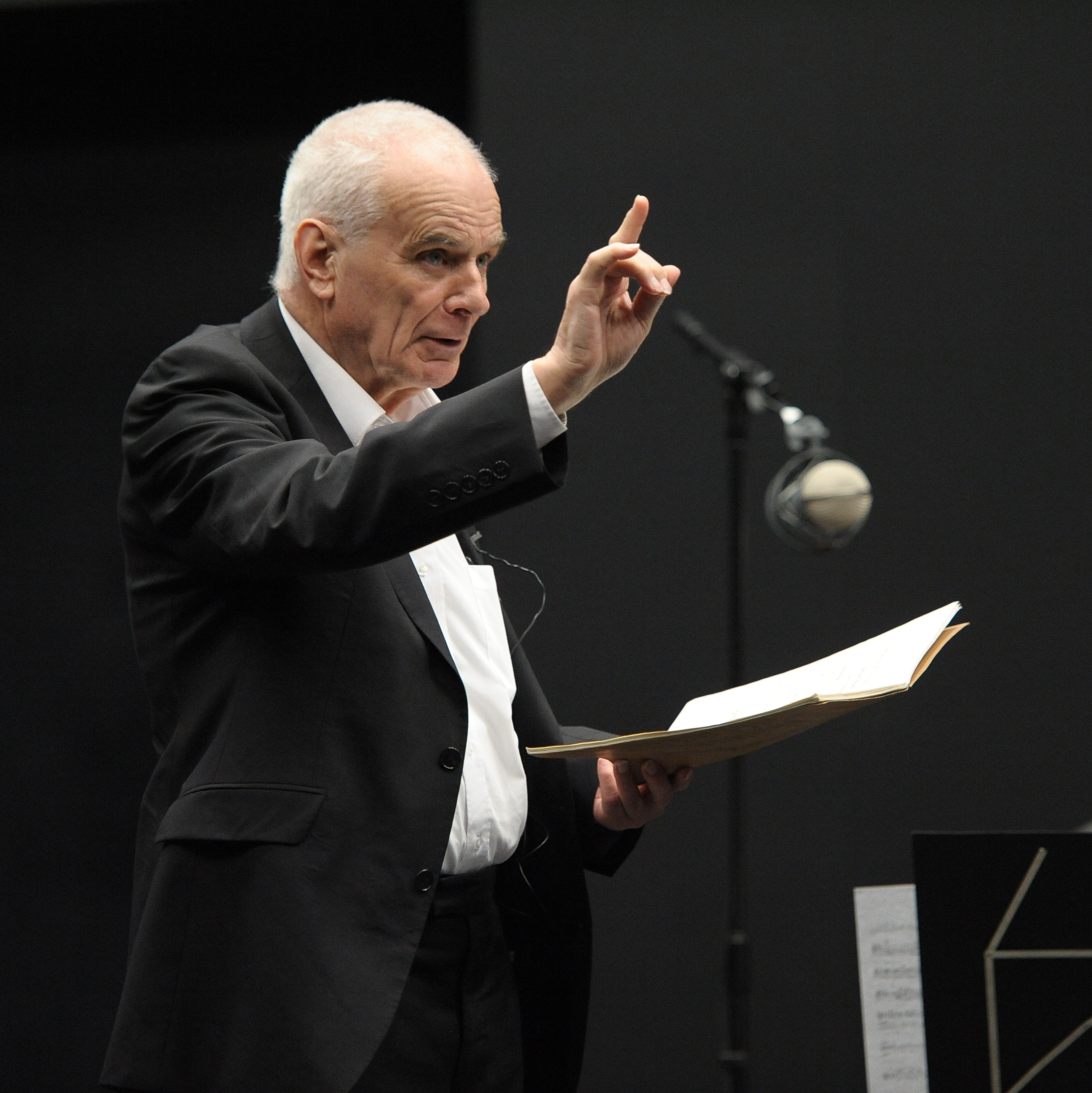
- The composer in 2012
- Librettist: David Pountney
- Premiere: 18 March 2011; Royal Academy of Music, London

Kommilitonen! (Young Blood!, or Student Activists, literally Fellow Students!) is an opera by Sir Peter Maxwell Davies. The libretto is by David Pountney, who was also the director of the premiere performances in March 2011.

== Genesis ==
According to Professor Jonathan Freeman-Attwood, the principal of the Royal Academy of Music in London, it was at a lunch to celebrate the appointment of Maxwell Davies to the Academy's staff that a suggestion was made that he might be interested in writing an opera for the students to perform. At first, the composer unequivocally declared that his days of composing opera or musical theatre were over, but he soon changed his mind, with the provisos that:

- the opera must be about students,
- David Pountney must be involved, and
- the opera should be commissioned in collaboration with another college.

Pountney's agreeing to write the libretto and direct the opera, and the agreement of the Juilliard School's President, Joseph W. Polisi, to the sharing of the commission, set the project in motion. The premiere, designed by Robert Innes Hopkins and conducted by the Academy's director of opera, Jane Glover, took place at the college's Sir Jack Lyons Theatre on 18 March 2011. The American premiere took place at the Juilliard School in November 2011. It was performed by the WNO Youth Opera at the Wales Millennium Centre in 2016.

== Roles ==
Roles, voice types, casts at UK and New York premieres
Role	Voice type	World premiere cast Royal Academy of Music 18 March 2011 Conductor: Jane Glover	American premiere cast Juilliard School 16 November 2011 Conductor: Anne Manson
The Oxford Revolution
James Meredith	baritone	Marcus Farnsworth	Will Liverman
Voice of Pokayne	baritone	Jonathan McGovern	Tobias Greenhalgh
Die Weisse Rose
Sophie Scholl	soprano	Aoife Miskelly	Deanna Breiwick
Hans Scholl, her brother	baritone	Johnny Herford	Alexander Hajek
Willi Graf	bass-baritone	Frederick Long	Leo Radosavljevic
Christoph Probst/The Evangelist	tenor	Andrew Dickinson	Noah Baetge
Alexander Schmorell/The Grand Inquisitor	bass	John-Owen Miley-Read	Aubrey Allicock
First Clerk/Prison Guard	mezzo-soprano	Irina Gheorghiu	Laetitia De Beck Spitzer
Second Clerk/Gestapo Officer 1/Janitor	baritone	Jonathan McGovern	Takaoki Onishi, John Brancy
Gestapo Officer 2	baritone	Maximilian Führig	Tobias Greenhalgh
Soar to Heaven
Li Jingji (Mother)	mezzo-soprano	Irina Gheorghiu	Lacey Jo Benter
Wu Tianshi (Father)	baritone	Jonathan McGovern	Jeongcheol Cha
Wu (Son)	mezzo-soprano	Katie Bray	Wallis Giunta
Li (Daughter)	soprano	Belinda Williams	Heather Engebretson
Two Younger Children	sopranos	Hannah Bradbury, Annie Rago	
Zhou (Red Guard)	soprano	Ruth Jenkins	Karen Vuong
Red Army Officer 1	mezzo-soprano	Belinda Williams	
Doctor/Red Army Officer 2	mezzo-soprano	Laura Kelly	
Red Army Officer 3	mezzo-soprano	Irina Gheorghiu	
Puppets	silent	Blind Summit Theatre	
Chorus of American, German and Chinese students and other citizens

== Synopsis ==
The opera, which has twenty-eight scenes, tells three true stories. One, The Oxford Revolution, is about James Meredith and his struggle to be admitted to the University of Mississippi. The second, Die Weisse Rose, deals with Hans and Sophie Scholl, students at the University of Munich (LMU Munich), who exposed Nazi atrocities, and the third, Soar to Heaven, depicts students who were forced to denounce their parents during the Cultural Revolution in China. This story is based on part of John Pomfret's book Chinese Lessons. The three stories come together at the end of the opera.

== Scenes ==
Act 1

1. Last Sortie (The Oxford Revolution)
2. Stamps (Die Weisse Rose)
3. Slogans I (Die Weisse Rose)
4. Wall Painting (Die Weisse Rose)
5. Slogans II (Soar to Heaven)
6. My Father (The Oxford Revolution)
7. Liederabend (Die Weisse Rose)
8. Denunciation (Soar to Heaven)
9. Directories (Die Weisse Rose)
10. Envelopes (Die Weisse Rose)
11. The First Leaflet (Die Weisse Rose)
12. The Duplicator (Die Weisse Rose)
13. The Train (Die Weisse Rose)
14. Rabbits (The Oxford Revolution)
15. Eyewitness I (Soar to Heaven)

16. Eyewitness II (Die Weisse Rose)
17. Wu Comes Home (Soar to Heaven)
18. Naming of the Guard (Soar to Heaven)

Act 2

19. Riot (The Oxford Revolution)
20. The Grand Inquisitor (Die Weisse Rose)
21. Quingming (Soar to Heaven)
22. Arrest (Die Weisse Rose)
23. Party (Soar to Heaven)
24. Registration (The Oxford Revolution)
25. Dream
26. Epilogue
27. Execution (Die Weisse Rose)
28. Finale

== Instrumentation ==
The opera requires:

- about forty musicians in the pit (strings, piccolo, flutes, oboes, cor anglais, clarinets, bass clarinet, bassoons, contrabassoon, horns, trumpets, trombones, timpani, percussion)
- an on-stage marching band for some of the Chinese scenes (piccolo, oboe, cor anglaises, cornets, trombone, sousaphone, percussion)
- a backstage brass quintet (cornets, trombone, bass trombone, tuba, percussion)
- an on-stage Jazz trio (piano, drums, double-bass)
- an on-stage harp
- an on-stage erhu for some of the Chinese scenes

== Reception ==
Some excerpts from reviews in British newspapers, March 2011:

- Andrew Clements in The Guardian: "It commutes effortlessly between the narratives, Davies's music delineating each strand with remarkable clarity. His score is extraordinarily fluent: the vocal lines are perfectly judged and the instrumental writing full of wonderful touches, with marching band, jazz trio, solo harp and erhu players on stage. It is as good as any theatre score he has ever composed."
- Rupert Christiansen in The Daily Telegraph: "Sir Peter Maxwell Davies makes a splendid grumpy old man, and I am totally behind him over his recent stands against muzak in restaurants and on television documentaries. I only wish I could be so whole-hearted in support of his operas, but I have never found them of anything but superficial musical and theatrical interest. His latest effort, Kommilitonen! doesn't break the mould."
- Kieron Quirke in the London Evening Standard: "Kommilitonen! is a glorious, heart-warming pageant of humanity."
- Richard Fairman in the Financial Times: "Running these tales simultaneously could have resulted in a confusing mishmash but Pountney has pinpointed the crucial elements of each so cleverly that everything is clear and the juxtapositions strike sparks off each other. Equally, the music works with exemplary theatrical skill; Maxwell Davies has coloured his score with snatches of American roots music, German art song and brassy Chinese marches without ever losing sight of the opera's unifying goal."
- George Hall in The Stage: "Fast moving in its presentation, the production is a punchy piece of theatre that proves surprisingly topical, even if its overall look and naive stance – there are obvious heroes and villains, with nothing in between – recall 1970s agit-prop. So does much of the score, wide-ranging and effective though its use of pastiche is, and drawing on the techniques of the memorable music theatre works that first brought Maxwell Davies to notoriety. Visually, this is a fine realisation, purposefully conducted by Jane Glover, though ultimately its simplistic viewpoint and air of nostalgia tell against it."
- Anna Picard in The Independent: "Diverting as it is, the opera is simplistic. This would be understandable were it written by, not for, students. So much emphasis is placed on books in Pountney's staging that it is hard to escape the suspicion that he believes a well-stocked library confers moral grace. History is full of literate thugs, but you won't find them in Kommilitonen!. The Dostoevsky scene could have been lifted from The Producers, with the Evangelist (Stephen Aviss) in a white SS uniform and the Inquisitor (John-Owen Miley-Read) in a black SS uniform. Meanwhile, Max attempts to convey Meredith's strength of character in music that is a homespun hair's breadth from Porgy and Bess. Orchestrally, vocally, theatrically, the performance is a triumph, but one that is not without compromise."
