= Mr Emmet Takes a Walk =

- Chamber opera by Peter Maxwell Davies
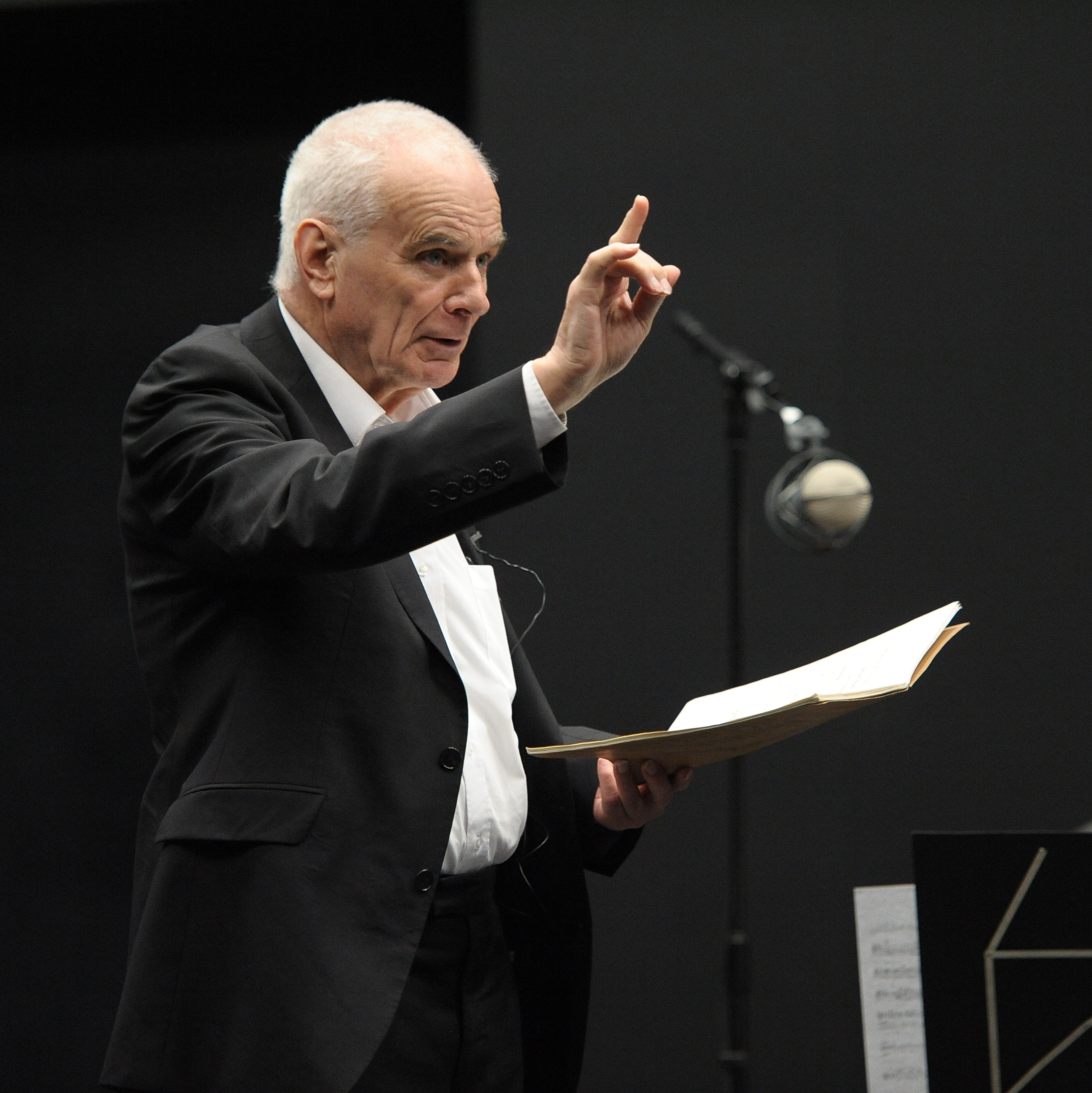
- The composer in 2012
- Description: "dramatic sonata"
- Librettist: David Pountney
- Premiere: 16 June 2000; St. Magnus Festival, Orkney

Mr Emmet Takes a Walk is a chamber opera by the English composer Sir Peter Maxwell Davies with a libretto by David Pountney. The work is self-described as a "dramatic sonata".

It tells the story of the last seconds of the life of Mr Emmet before his suicide on a railway line. Thoughts, ideas, musical fragments and experiences flash through Mr Emmet's mind before his death which expand across the fifty-minute duration of the work.

Davies has cited the works of four composers as motifs in the opera:

- Bach's Prelude and Fugue No. 12 in F minor (BWV, 881) from Book 2 of the Well-Tempered Clavier
- Andrea Gabrieli's Edipo Tiranno
- "Come furia disperata" from Mozart's Don Giovanni (sung by the character Donna Anna in act 1, scene 1),
- the opening of Schumann's Second Symphony.

The work premiered in a co-production of Muziektheater Transparant and the Psappha ensemble at the St. Magnus Festival, Orkney on 16 June 2000. It was recorded in 2005 with the original cast. The German Premier took place in 2004, produced by the Berliner Kammeroper, directed by Kay Kuntze, and conducted by Brynmor Jones.

Although Davies intimated that Mr Emmet Takes a Walk would be his last piece of musical theatre, just over a decade later he completed the a further opera, Kommilitonen!.

== Roles ==
Role	Voice type	Première cast, 16 June 2000 Conductor: Étienne Siebens
Mr Emmet	baritone	Adrian Clarke
multiple roles	bass-baritone	Jonathan Best
multiple roles	soprano	Rebecca Caine
Orchestra		Psappha
Director		David Pountney

== Sections ==
Exposition — A premonition

- No. 1 Introduction
- No. 2 Duet
- No. 3 Arioso
- No. 4 Cabaletta
- No. 5 Trio

Development — Encounters

- Episode 1 The Piano
- Interlude 1
- Episode 2 The Park
- Interlude 2
- Episode 3 The Hotel Room
- Interlude 3
- Episode 4 The Mountain
- Interlude 4
- Episode 5 The Teacher
- The Torch Song
- Interlude 5
- Recapitulation - A monologue
- Coda
