= Wallis Giunta =

Canadian opera singer (born 1985)

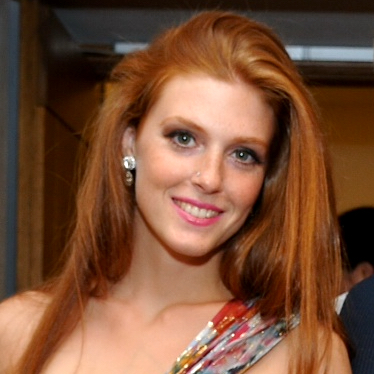
- Born: 29 December 1985 (age 40); Ottawa, Ontario, Canada
- Occupations: Opera singer (mezzo-soprano), actress
- Years active: 2010–present
- Spouse: Alex Banfield (m. 2022)
- Children: 2
- Website: wallisgiunta.com

Wallis Giunta (born 29 December 1985) is an Irish-Canadian mezzo-soprano opera singer performing at leading theatres and opera companies around the world.

== Early life and education ==
Giunta was born in Ottawa to Colleen Wrighte and Michael Giunta. She has a brother, Macallan, and a sister, Marley. Giunta sang in the Ottawa Central Children's Choir from age 9 to 15, and began voice training with Charlotte Stewart in Ottawa at age 13. She attended Lisgar Collegiate Institute, and graduated from Glebe Collegiate Institute high school. At 17, she began her post-secondary studies in voice at The University of Ottawa, completing two years. She then transferred to The Glenn Gould School of The Royal Conservatory of Music in Toronto in her junior year, receiving her Performance Diploma (Voice) at age 21 and her Artist Diploma (Voice) at age 23. While a student, she achieved first place in the Royal Conservatory Orchestra Concerto Competition. She attended training programs at the Aspen Music Festival and School, the Ravinia Festival, the Internationale Meistersinger Akademie, the Georg Solti Accademia and the Banff Centre. She graduated from the Canadian Opera Company Ensemble Studio in 2011, and both the Metropolitan Opera Lindemann Young Artist Development Program and The Juilliard School Artist Diploma in Opera Studies in 2013. She has studied extensively with both Jean MacPhail in Toronto, and Edith Wiens in New York.

== Career ==
In spring 2010, before completing her studies, Giunta made her professional debut as Cherubino in Le nozze di Figaro with Opera Atelier and the Tafelmusik Baroque Orchestra in Toronto. She spent summer 2010 at the Ravinia Festival in Chicago, where she was invited to audition for the Metropolitan Opera Lindemann Young Artist Development Program, which she joined in September 2011. Earlier in 2011, she had made her American operatic debut as Pribaoutki in the acclaimed Robert Lepage production of Stravinsky's The Nightingale & Other Short Fables, on tour with the Canadian Opera Company. That season, she also performed Zweite Dame in the Canadian Opera Company main stage production of Mozart's Die Zauberflöte, directed by Diane Paulus, and made her debut at Opera Lyra Ottawa as Lola in Mascagni's Cavalleria rusticana. In 2012, she performed in two Metropolitan Opera Young Artist productions, as Phénice in Gluck's Armide, and as Dorabella in Stephen Wadsworth's staging of Così fan tutte. She also debuted at the Fort Worth Opera as Cherubino.

In 2013 she returned to the Canadian Opera Company singing both Sesto and Annio in Mozart's La clemenza di Tito, directed by Christopher Alden. This was followed by her Metropolitan Opera main stage debut as Contessa Ceprano in Verdi's Rigoletto, and her debut at the Théâtre du Châtelet in Paris, singing the role of Tiffany in I Was Looking at the Ceiling and Then I Saw the Sky, by John Adams. She also made her Asian debut later that year, with the Taipei Symphony Orchestra, reprising the role of Annio.

In 2014, she returned to the Canadian Opera Company, reprising the role of Dorabella, in a new production by director Atom Egoyan. She also created the Canadian premiere of Louis Andriessen's one-woman opera, Anaïs Nin, for the 21C Festival in Toronto, and returned to Opera Atelier as Bradamante in Handel's Alcina.

In early 2015, Giunta returned to the Metropolitan Opera as Olga in a new production of Lehár's The Merry Widow, broadcast worldwide for their Live in HD series. That was followed by a return to Opera Lyra Ottawa as Cherubino, and a debut at Teatro dell'Opera di Roma, reprising her role in I Was Looking at the Ceiling and Then I Saw the Sky. In the fall of 2015, she became a member of the ensemble at Oper Leipzig in Germany. In November 2015, she made her German operatic debut at Oper Leipzig in the role of Cherubino, in a new production of Le nozze di Figaro. That was followed at Oper Leipzig by her role debut as Siébel in Gounod's Faust, and her first Wagnerian role as Rossweise in Die Walküre.

In March 2016 she made another role debut at Oper Leipzig as Angelina in La Cenerentola. She debuted in April 2016 at the Deutsche Oper am Rhein, followed by a debut with the Hamburger Symphoniker in May 2016, and her role debut as Mercédès in Carmen for Oper Frankfurt's new Barry Kosky staging in July 2016. In the fall of 2016, she debuted a new role at Opera Atelier, Dido in Purcell's Dido and Aeneas, and debuted in concert with the Munich Radio Orchestra and Symphony Nova Scotia.

In 2017, she starred in three productions for Opera North, singing the title roles in La Cenerentola and L'enfant et les sortilèges, as well as Dinah in Bernstein's Trouble in Tahiti, again to critical acclaim. She was recognized for her work in 2017 with awards from the International Opera Awards, WhatsOnStage Opera Awards and The Arts Desk.

Giunta made her London debut at Cadogan Hall in the BBC Proms on 27 August 2018. She also made her first appearance on BBC Television as a guest on BBC Proms "Extra", live at Royal Albert Hall in August, 2018. She gave her first TEDx Talk, on embracing artistic versatility, in May 2018. She also received critical acclaim for her role as Dinah in the film version of Trouble in Tahiti, released in July 2018 by Opera North and The Guardian. She went on to debut the role of Rosina in Rossini's Il barbiere di Siviglia, and the title roles in Bizet's Carmen and Strauss's Der Rosenkavalier, all for Oper Leipzig.

In 2019 Giunta debuted as Dodo in Breaking the Waves by Missy Mazzoli at the Edinburgh International Festival, debuted the role of Idamante in Mozart's Idomeneo for Opera Atelier, debuted at The Grange Festival as Cherubino, at the Sydney Opera House in a solo concert, and at the Royal Swedish Opera and Seattle Opera as the title role in Rossini's La Cenerentola. In 2020, before COVID-19 pandemic-related cancellations, Giunta also debuted at the Deutsche Oper am Rhein as Bradamante in Handel's Alcina, and reprised the role of Dodo in Breaking the Waves for the Adelaide Festival.

== Operatic roles ==
Giunta's repertoire includes:

- Tiffany, I Was Looking at the Ceiling and Then I Saw the Sky (Adams)
- Nancy T'ang, Nixon in China (Adams)
- Anaïs, Anaïs Nin (Andriessen)
- Sally, A Hand of Bridge (Barber)
- Gymnasiast, Lulu (Berg)
- Paquette, Candide (Bernstein)
- Dinah, Trouble in Tahiti (Bernstein)
- Carmen, Carmen (Bizet)
- Hermia, A Midsummer Night's Dream (Britten)
- Nancy, Albert Herring (Britten)
- English Lady, Death in Venice (Britten)
- Pandora, Pandora's Locker (Burry) @
- Wu, Kommilitonen! (Davies) @@
- Elisabeth/Natalya, Die Letzte Verschwörung (Eggert) @
- Phenice, Armide (Gluck)
- Siebel, Faust (Gounod)
- Olga, The Merry Widow (Lehár)
- Bradamante, Alcina (Handel)
- Ernesto, Il mondo della luna (Haydn)
- Hänsel, Hänsel und Gretel (Humperdinck)
- Lola, Cavalleria rusticana (Mascagni)
- Dodo, Breaking the Waves (Missy Mazzoli) @@@
- Annio/Sesto, La clemenza di Tito (Mozart)
- Cherubino, The Marriage of Figaro (Mozart)
- Dorabella, Così fan tutte (Mozart)
- Idamante, Idomeneo (Mozart)
- The Second Lady, The Magic Flute (Mozart)
- Muse/Niklausse, Les Contes d'Hoffmann (Offenbach)
- Öffentliche Meinung, Orpheus in der Unterwelt (Offenbach)
- Maria, Maria de Buenos Aires (Piazzolla)
- Dido, Dido and Aeneas (Purcell)
- L'Enfant, L'enfant et les sortilèges (Ravel)
- Il Fuso, La Bella Dormente nel Bosco (Respighi)
- Rosina, The Barber of Seville (Rossini)
- Angelina (Cenerentola), La Cenerentola (Rossini)
- Clarina, La cambiale di matrimonio (Rossini)
- The King's Mistress, The Children's Crusade (Schafer) @
- Orlofsky, Die Fledermaus (J. Strauss)
- Octavian, Der Rosenkavalier (R. Strauss)
- Pribaoutki, The Nightingale & Other Short Fables (Stravinsky)
- Contessa Ceprano, Rigoletto (Verdi)
- Roßweiße, Die Walküre (Wagner)
- Blumenmädchen, Parsifal (Wagner)
- Wellgunde, Das Rheingold (Wagner)
- Lilian Holiday, Happy End (Weill)
- Anna I, Die Sieben Todsünden (Weill)

@ World première • @@ North America première • @@@ European première

== Recognition and awards ==
Year	Association	Category	Work	Result	Ref.
2016	Canada Council for the Arts	Bernard Diamant Prize		Won	
2017	Whatsonstage.com Opera Awards	Breakthrough Artist in UK Opera		Won	
2017	Dora Mavor Moore Awards	Outstanding Performance – Ensemble (Opera)	Dido and Aeneas	Nominated	
2018	International Opera Awards	Young Singer of the Year		Won	
2025	International Opera Awards	Readers' Award		Nominated	

- 2010: Encouragement Award winner at the George London Competition
- 2010: Winner of New Discoveries Competition
- 2012: Winner of the Sylva Gelber Music Foundation Award
- 2013: Named one of the Top 30 Canadian Classical Musicians Under 30, by the Canadian Broadcasting Corporation
- 2013: Received the Juilliard School Novick Career Advancement Grant
- 2014: Named one of the Top 30 Canadian Classical Musicians Under 30, by the Canadian Broadcasting Corporation
- 2015: Chosen to perform for the Governor General's Performing Arts Awards in Canada
- 2015: Named one of the "Top 25 People in Canada's Capital", by Ottawa Life Magazine
- 2015: Named one of the Top 30 Canadian Classical Musicians Under 30, by the Canadian Broadcasting Corporation
- 2017: Named "Young Singer of the Year" by The Arts Desk

== Recordings ==
- Dancing on a Volcano; singing Anna I in Die Dieben Todsünden by Kurt Weill; recorded at the Kölner Philharmonie in January 2025 with Ensemble Modern & HK Gruber in Köln, Germany.
- The Seven Deadly Sins; singing Anna I in the title work by Kurt Weill; recorded for BIS Records in August 2024 with the Swedish Chamber Orchestra & HK Gruber in Örebro, Sweden.
- Music for Great Films of the Silent Era; music by William P. Perry; recorded for Naxos Records in June 2014 with the RTÉ National Symphony Orchestra & Paul Phillips (conductor) in Dublin, Ireland.
- Richard Strauss: Lieder Op. 10, 15, 17; recorded independently in July 2013, with pianist Carson Becke, in Quebec, Canada.

== Film ==
- The Seven Deadly Sins; as Anna I, produced by Opera North and filmed by the BBC; premiered November 2020.
- Trouble in Tahiti; produced by Opera North and The Space, for the Leonard Bernstein centenary; premiered July 2018.
- Dans les pas de Cendrillon; a documentary about the history of the Cinderella story, produced by Arte; premiered January 2017.
- The Merry Widow, by Franz Lehár, recorded for The Metropolitan Opera Live in HD series in January 2015; released on DVD and Blu-ray by Decca.
- Une Saison a la Juilliard School; a documentary series about students at the Juilliard School, produced by Arte; released on DVD in 2013.
- "Opera Atelier: Don Giovanni"; a mini documentary about Mozart's title character, Don Giovanni; produced by Bravo and 90th Parallel Productions in 2010.

== Personal life ==
Giunta is married to husband Alex Banfield and they have two children, Geordie (born 2021) and Bonnie (born 2023).
