= Ann Howard (mezzo-soprano) =

British mezzosoprano

- Born: Ann Pauline Swadling; 22 July 1934; Streatham, London
- Died: 26 March 2014 (aged 79); Surbiton, Surrey
- Occupation: Mezzo-soprano
- Employer: English National Opera et al
- Known for: Opera singing

Ann Howard (born Ann Pauline Swadling, 22 July 1934 – 26 March 2014) was an English mezzo-soprano and actress who had an international performance career in operas, musicals, and concerts that spanned five decades. She began performing on the stage as an amateur in the late 1940s, and made her professional debut in London's West End in the 1956 musical Wild Grows the Heather. She spent the next four years performing as principal boy in British pantomime before joining the chorus of the Royal Opera House (ROH) in 1959. After studying opera on a scholarship in France, she returned to the ROH as principal singer in small to mid-sized roles from 1963 to 1965.

Howard's first large role in an opera was as Azucena in Il trovatore at the Welsh National Opera (WNO) in 1964. That same year she joined the Sadler's Wells Opera (later re-named the English National Opera) with whom she performed regularly into the 1990s in a wide range of parts from leading ladies to character roles; among them Delilah in Camille Saint-Saëns's Samson and Delilah, the Witch in Engelbert Humperdinc's Hansel and Gretel, Fricka in Wagner's Ring Cycle, Lilli Vanessi / Katharine in Cole Porter's musical Kiss Me, Kate, the Composer in Strauss's Ariadne auf Naxos, and Rosina in Rossini's The Barber of Seville to name just a few. In 1970 she had a major success at Sadler's Wells in the title role of Bizet's Carmen, and she subsequently sang this role repeatedly at theaters around the world over the next 14 years.

In her later career, Howard performed in many contemporary operas. She also sang in several world premieres, and starred as Cinderella's Step Mother in the 1990 West End production of Stephen Sondheim's Into the Woods. Her final performance was as Auntie in Benjamin Britten's Peter Grimes at the WNO in 1999; a role she had sung earlier at the English National Opera in 1991 and at the Metropolitan Opera in 1995. Music critic Noël Goodwin wrote that Howard's "vivid stage personality, strong in comedy or in sinister character, is combined with clear articulation and a full and flexible voice over a wide compass."

== Early life ==
The daughter of William Alfred Swadling and his wife Gladys Winifred Swadling (née Howell), Ann Pauline Swadling was born in Streatham, London on 22 July 1934. Her father was an engineer. She left school aged 15 and went to work as an assistant in the jewelry shop Finnigans of Bond Street, later moving to Garrard & Co, jewellers, which had its own operatic group. In her spare time she took singing lessons; studying with Topliss Green in London from 1956 to 1962 and Rodolpha Lhombino from 1962 to 1963.

Howard gained early stage experience performing in amateur productions with the Geoids Amateur Operatic Society; first performing with the company in Merrie England in 1949. She met pianist Keith Desmond Giles while doing this production, and they later married on 20 March 1954. The couple one daughter together. She was able to resign from shop work when she began appearing in musicals and pantomimes.

== Early career ==
Howard began her professional career as a musical theatre actress; making her stage debut under her married name Ann Giles at the Palace Theatre, Manchester on 13 March 1956 in Jack Waller and Hugh Ross Williamson's musical Wild Grows the Heather. The work was adapted from J. M. Barrie's play The Little Minister, and Howard was listed as portraying one of the singers in the ensemble in this production when it transferred to the London Hippodrome the following May.

At Waller's suggestion, Howard adopted the stage name Ann Howard, and then moved into working in pantomime. She spent four years working as principal boy in pantomime productions opposite stars like Tommy Steele. Some of the productions she performed in included Goody Two Shoes at the Alhambra Theatre Glasgow, Queen of Hearts in Leeds, and Goldilocks and the Three Bears in Liverpool. Her height of 5 feet and 10 inches was an asset in making her portrayal of male characters believable.

Having previously seen only one opera, Howard successfully auditioned for the chorus of the Royal Opera in 1959 at the urging of her husband. Soon after she was awarded a scholarship to study with Dominique Modesti in Paris; an opportunity given to her after conductor Edward Downes became her advocate. She appeared in several small to mid-sized roles at the Royal Opera House; including Kate Pinkerton in Puccini's Madama Butterfly (1963) with André Turp portraying her character's husband; the Lady-in-Waiting in Verdi's Macbeth (1964) with Cornell MacNeil in the title role; and Waltraute in Wagner's Die Walküre (1965) with conductor Georg Solti.

== Leading mezz-soprano ==
=== Sadler's Wells Opera / English National Opera ===
Howard had a lengthy career on the opera stage that encompassed both leading female characters and character roles of the "witches and bitches" variety. In August 1964 she appeared as the witch Azucena in Verdi's Il trovatore for her first appearance in a major opera role with the Welsh National Opera. The cast included Maureen Keetch as Leonora, Rowland Jones as Manrico, and Geoffrey Chard as the Count di Luna with Eric Wetherell as conductor. She had previously made her debut with the Sadler's Wells Opera (SWO) in the supporting role of Czipra in The Gypsy Baron at the Sadler's Wells Theatre in June 1964; a production which starred Nigel Douglas in the title role and which was also given at the 1964 Aldeburgh Festival.

Howard was a regular performer with the SWO for many years, and continued to perform with the company long after it became the English National Opera (ENO) in 1974. On 24 February 1965 she created the role of Leda in the SWO's world premiere production of Richard Rodney Bennett's The Mines of Sulphur; a role she repeated when it was revived at the London Coliseum in 1973. Some of her other early parts with this company included the Witch in Humperdinck's Hansel and Gretel (1964 role debut), the Queen of the Fairies in Iolanthe (1965), Delilah in Saint-Saëns's Samson and Delilah (1966 role debut), Musetta in Puccini's La bohème (1966), Baba the Turk in Stravinsky's The Rake's Progress (1967, role debut), Concepción in Ravel's L'heure espagnole (1967), Jocasta in Stravinsky's Oedipus rex (1967), the Composer in Strauss's Ariadne auf Naxos (1968), Boulotte in Offenbach's Bluebeard (1969), Proserpina in Monteverdi's L'Orfeo (1969), Fricka in Wagner's Ring Cycle (beginning in 1970, led by Reginald Goodall), Rosina in Rossini's The Barber of Seville (1970), Lilli Vanessi / Katharine in Cole Porter's musical Kiss Me, Kate (1970), Ortrud in Wagner's Lohengrin (1971, role debut), and the First Norn in Götterdämmerung (1972).

In 1974 Howard portrayed Alice in SWO's production of Alexander Goehr's Arden Must Die for the work's UK premiere. When she reprised the role of Humperdinck's witch at the ENO in the 1970s with conductor Mario Bernardi she recorded the part for a record released by HMV in 1976. Ten years later she recorded the role of another witch with the ENO, Ježibaba, in Antonín Dvořák's Rusalka (1986, with conductor Mark Elder and Eilene Hannan in the title role). Howard was still playing Humperdinck's witch at the ENO as late as 1980 with Kate Flowers as Gretel and Fiona Kimm as Hansel. Other parts she sang with ENO included the Secretary of the Consulate in Menotti's The Consul (1978) Babulenka in Prokofiev's The Gambler (1983), Kabanicha in Janáček’s Katya Kabanova (1985), and Verdi's Azucena (1986) with Jane Eaglen as Leonora.

In 1982 Howard performed the role of Mescalina in the UK premiere of György Ligeti's Le Grand Macabre with the ENO. According to her obituary in The Telegraph, the role "required her to appear in suspenders and fishnets flagellating her husband as another couple made love in the back of a hearse." In 1984 she portrayed Hélène Bezukhova in ENO's production of Sergei Prokofiev's War and Peace using a new English translation by Edward Downes. In 1986 she portrayed Katisha in ENO's production of Gilbert and Sullivan's The Mikado which was staged by Jonathan Miller and co-starred Monty Python comedian Eric Idle as Ko-Ko. She was still in the role when Bill Oddie assumed the role of Ko-Ko in 1988, followed by Richard Suart in 1991. In 1989 she portrayed Mrs Elsie Worthing in the world premiere of David Blake's The Plumber’s Gift with ENO. In 1991 she portrayed Auntie in Benjamin Britten's Peter Grimes in a new production by Tim Albery at ENO, and that same year performed Prince Orlofsky in a new staging of Die Fledermaus by Richard Jones.

=== Carmen ===
In 1970 Howard portrayed the title role in Georges Bizet's Carmen for the first time at the SWO; a successful production which led to her American debut in this same part at the New Orleans Opera in 1971 with Plácido Domingo as Don José. The SWO production was staged by John Copley. The role of Carmen brought her fame and she repeated the role many times both in England and on the international stage. While Howard claimed she avoided portraying Carmen as overly sexual, reviews from male critics tended towards the lustful with words like “smouldering” and “voluptuous” repeatedly cropping up in reviews and one critic claiming she was “Raquel Welch with a voice”.

Some of the organizations Howard sang Carmen with included the New York City Opera (1972 & 1977-1978), San Diego Opera (1973), Phoenix Symphony (1973), Edmonton Opera (1974), Shreveport Opera (1976), Fort Worth Opera (1976), Dayton Opera (1979), the Orquesta Filarmónica de Jalisco (1978), the Opéra Royal de Wallonie (1979, and on tour to Place des Arts in Montreal), Toledo Opera (1979 & 1983), and Calgary Opera (1981) among others. By 1981 she had sung the role more than 250 times. She gave her last performances as Carmen in 1984.

=== Other work ===
In 1966 Howard gave her first performance at the Scottish Opera (SO) as both Fricka and Waltraute in Wagner's Die Walküre. She later returned there as Cassandre in Berlioz's Les Troyens (1969), Brangäne in Wagner's Tristan und Isolde (1973), Venere in Cavalli's L'Orione (1984), the Old Lady in Bernstein's Candide (1988), and Marcellina in Mozart's The Marriage of Figaro. In 1973 she returned to the Royal Opera House as Amneris in Aida. In 1975 she returned to Welsh National Opera (WNO) in the title role of Offenbach's La Grande-Duchesse de Gérolstein. She sang Delilah to Gilbert Py's Samson at Opera North (ON) in 1982, and the following year returned to ON as Mrs Danvers in the world premiere of Wilfred Josephs's Rebecca.

Howard was also active a concert singer. In 1968 she was a soloist in Verdi's Requiem with the Guildford Choral Society. In 1969 she sang the role of the Mother in a concert version of Stravinsky's Mavra at Royal Albert Hall with Sir Colin Davis and the BBC Symphony Orchestra. That same year a studio recording of the musical The Arcadians in which she was a principal singer was released by EMI Records. She made several filmed operas for BBC Two television broadcast with Raymond Leppard and the New Philharmonia Orchestra; including the parts of Prince Orlofsky in Die Fledermaus (1971) and Flora in La traviata (1973) with Joan Cross as Violetta.

On the international stage, Howard performed in theaters across Europe, North America, Mexico and South Africa. She appeared as a guest artist at the Edinburgh International Festival, Opéra de Nancy, Opéra-Théâtre de Metz Métropole, Rouen Opera House, and Theater Saarbrücken. She sang Amneris in Aida at the Florentine Opera (1974), Fort Worth Opera (1976), the Canadian Opera Company (1976), and the Grand Théâtre de Bordeaux (1978). In 1977 she portrayed Isabella in Rossini's L'italiana in Algeri with the Baltimore Opera Company. Some of the other parts she performed on the international stage included Eboli in Verdi's Don Carlos and Leokadja Begbick in Rise and Fall of the City of Mahagonny. In 1980 she portrayed La belle Dulcinée in Massenet's Don Quichotte at the Opéra de Nice under conductor Jésus Etcheverry.

In 1974 Howard gave her first performance at the Santa Fe Opera (SFO) as Offenbach's Grande Duchesse; a role she repeated there in 1979. She returned often to the SFO; also appearing as Hero in Cavalli's L'Egisto (1974), Bizet's Carmen (1975), Adelaide von Waldner in Strauss's Arabella (1983), and L’Opinion Publique in Offenbach's Orpheus in the Underworld (1983 & 1985). Her final role with the SFO was Caliban in the world premiere of John Eaton's The Tempest (1985). In 1981 she returned to Fort Worth Opera as Clytemnestra in Elektra. In 1979 she sang Fricka in Das Rheingold at the Teatro di San Carlo. She repeated the role of Delilah at the Dayton Opera (1980, with Jean Cox as Samson), and at the Municipal Theatre of Santiago (1984). In 1982 she portrayed the title role in Massenet's Hérodiade at the Opéra de Saint-Étienne.

In 1990 Howard starred in the West End production of Stephen Sondheim's Into the Woods;. portraying the role of Cinderella’s Stepmother. The following year she appeared once again with Eric Idle in a rendition of Always Look on the Bright Side of Life at the Royal Variety Performance. She performed in several Gilbert and Sullivan productions with the Westchester Philharmonic at the performing arts center at Purchase College in New York during the 1990s; including The Duchess of Plaza-Toro in The Gondoliers (1993), Mrs. Cripps (Little Buttercup) in H.M.S. Pinafore (1994), Lady Sangazure in The Sorcerer (1995), and the Queen of the Fairies in Iolanthe (1996).

In 1995 Howard gave her first performance at the Metropolitan Opera as Auntie in Peter Grimes; performed the role of the Old Nun in a concert version of Hindemith's Sancta Susanna at the BBC Proms; and portrayed Emma Jones in Kurt Weill's Street Scene at the Teatro Regio, Turin. In 1996 she portrayed the 2nd Official in the world premiere of Peter Maxwell Davies's The Doctor of Myddfai with WNO; a production which was recorded on disc. Her final appearance was as Britten's Auntie with the WNO in 1999; a production in which she toured.

== Retirement and later life ==
She retired from the stage in 1999, but continued to teach young singers.

Howard died aged 79 at home in Surbiton, Surrey, on 26 March 2014 as a result of a pulmonary embolism and deep-vein thrombosis.
