= Alex Banfield =

English opera singer (born 1990)

- Born: Alexander James Banfield; 17 February 1990 (age 36); Morpeth, Northumberland, England
- Occupation: Opera singer
- Years active: 2015–present
- Spouse: Wallis Giunta (m. 2022)
- Children: 2
- Website: alexbanfield.co.uk

Alex Banfield (born 17 February 1990) is an English opera and concert tenor.

== Early life and education ==
Banfield grew up in Morpeth, Northumberland, and performed in local choral and operatic productions in Northern England in his early twenties, while obtaining a degree in Sociology from Leeds University. He then trained at the Royal Northern College of Music in Manchester, receiving a Master of Music (Voice). While a student in Manchester, he was a lay clerk at Manchester Cathedral. In 2013, he was a scholar with the Samling Institute (Samling Academy Opera), and made his debut with the title role in Britten's Albert Herring. He returned to Samling for their 2015 production of Ravel's L'enfant et les sortilèges to sing the Teacup and the Frog.

== Career ==
He performed full time with Opera North in Leeds until August 2020, when he joined the ensemble at Theatre Basel, Switzerland as a young artist on their OperAvenir 20/21 program. For Opera North he sang Sam Kaplan in Street Scene, Nikolio in Greek Passion by Martinů (directed by Christopher Alden), Jonathan Dale in the UK premiere of the Pulitzer Prize-winning opera Silent Night by Kevin Puts (directed by Tim Albery), St. Brioche in The Merry Widow, Hrazda in Osud (Janáček), and Nemorino in L'elisir d'amore for their Whistle Stop tour. He performed regularly in Manchester, including with the Manchester Opera Ensemble, Turton Consort, Chetham Chamber Orchestra and Manchester Baroque. In 2024, for Les Talens Lyriques he performed in a recording for the label Château de Versailles Spectacles in a little known piece, L'Olimpiade by Cimarosa, which culminated in a performance at the Royal Opera of Versailles. He has also performed with the Vienna Tonkünstler Orchestra, BBC Philharmonic Orchestra, the Royal Northern Sinfonia, and was regular soloist for the Liverpool Bach Collective.

== Personal life ==
Banfield is married to wife Wallis Giunta and they have two children Geordie (born 2021) and Bonnie (born 2023).
