= The Doctor of Myddfai =

Opera by Peter Maxwell Davies

- Opera by Peter Maxwell Davies
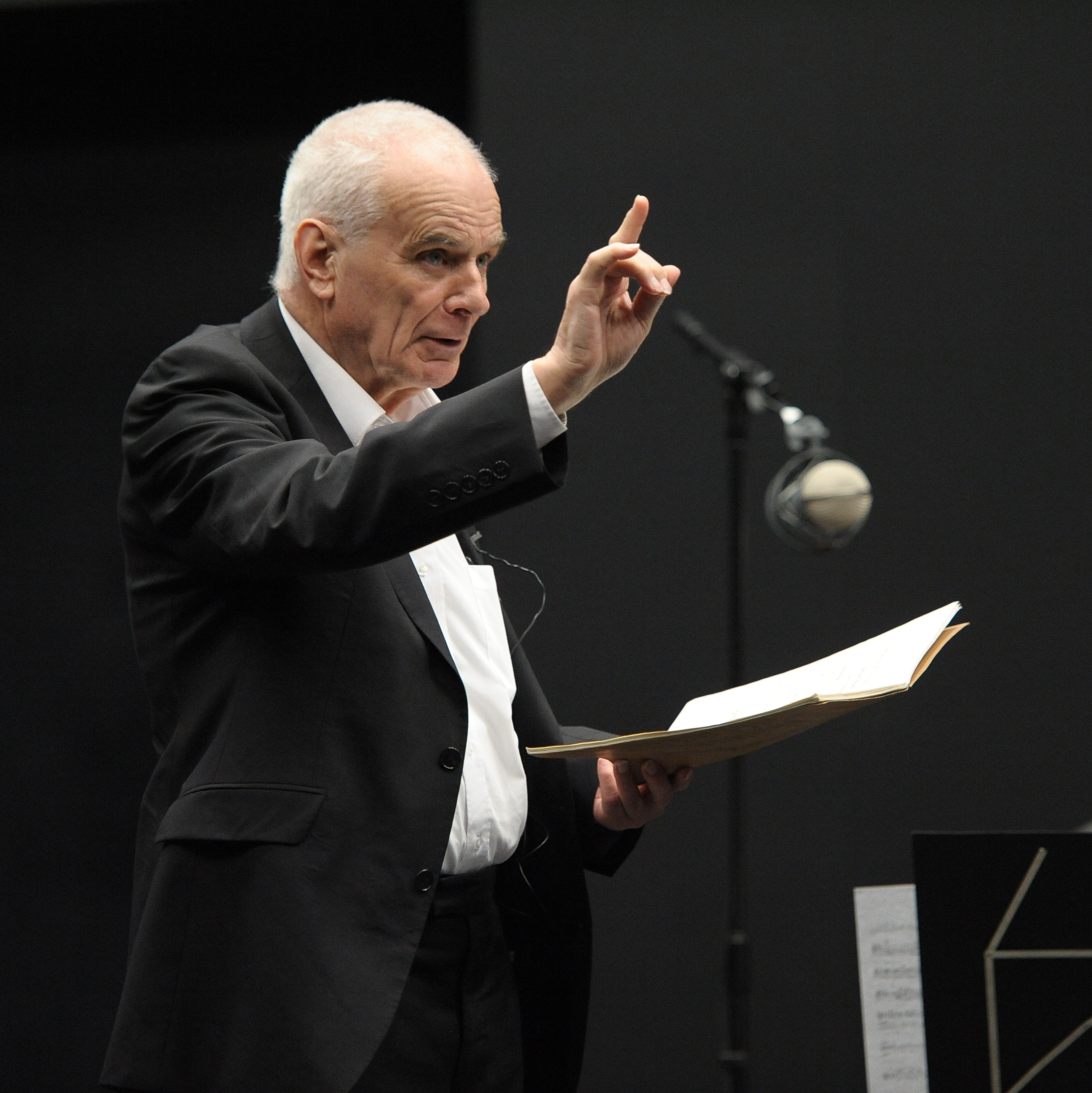
- The composer in 2012
- Librettist: David Pountney
- Based on: Welsh legend
- Premiere: 16 June 1996; New Theatre, Cardiff

The Doctor of Myddfai is an opera in two acts composed by Peter Maxwell Davies to a libretto by David Pountney. The work premiered at the New Theatre in Cardiff on 5 June 1996, performed by the Welsh National Opera and conducted by Richard Armstrong. The libretto was adapted from an ancient Welsh legend related to the Lady of the Lake legend. The original tale is reinterpreted in terms of a mysterious disease, knowledge of which the authorities are trying to suppress. The opera takes place in a totalitarian society similar to that envisioned in Orwell's 1984, with a supreme ruler, mechanistic bureaucracy and endless war.

== Roles ==
Role	Voice type	Premiere Cast, 5 June 1996 (Conductor: Richard Armstrong)
The Doctor	high baritone	Paul Whelan
The Child, a girl about 12 years old	soprano	Lisa Tyrrell
The Ruler	bass	Gwynne Howell
1st Official	mezzo-soprano	Elizabeth Vaughan
2nd Official	contralto	Ann Howard
3rd Official, Security Officer	high soprano	Nan Christie
10 Ministers, representing 10 zones	2 sopranos, 3 mezzo-sopranos 2 tenors, 3 basses	
2 Janitors	tenor and baritone	
3 Girls	soprano, mezzo-soprano, and contralto	
5 Groups of Officials	7 sopranos, 6 mezzo-sopranos, 5 tenors, 6 bass-baritones	
3 Guards	silent roles	
Chorus of people (SATB)

== Synopsis ==
Time: The near future
Place: The Welsh town of Myddfai (part of a larger European dictatorship)

Background legend

A shepherd fell in love with beautiful girl who appeared in Llyn y Fan Fach, a lake where he was tending his flock. He married her after passing the test of distinguishing her from her two sisters. However, there was a condition on their marriage. If he were to strike her three times during their marriage, she would return to the lake, taking all the wealth she had brought him. Eventually he struck her for a third time. She did indeed return to the lake, but left her healing powers to him and his descendants. They became The Doctors of Myddfai.

The opera

The Doctor is worried about a strange new disease that has broken out and retells the legend to his Child. The disease occurs whenever anyone receives a blow in the rain. The resulting bruise spreads over the entire body. Those who have the disease are desperate for a cure from The Doctor. He and a crowd of the sick (a chorus singing Christian hymns in Welsh) gather by the lake.

The Doctor tries to tell The Ruler about the disease, but The Ruler dismisses him and seeks to bury the story. Nevertheless, he is disturbed and seeks consolation with a woman who turns out to be The Doctor. In the ensuing confrontation in the rain, he strikes The Ruler, thus infecting him with the strange disease.

The State Council debates the crisis caused by the Ruler's absence. The Ruler eventually appears and demands that he be taken to the lake to be cured. There, the Doctor refuses to cure him. A crowd of the sick arrive at the lake and in their desperation for a cure trample The Doctor to death. The Child arrives, and orders the Ruler to walk into the lake. She becomes the new Doctor of Myddfai, preaching deliverance through recitation of the names of herbs and flowers.

== Recording ==
- The Doctor of Myddfai (Paul Whelan, Lisa Tyrrell, Gwynne Howell et al.; Welsh National Opera Orchestra and Chorus; Richard Armstrong, conductor) Recorded live, 5 October 1996. Label: Collins Classics 70462
