= Lisa Tyrrell =

English operatic soprano

Lisa Jane Tyrrell (born 7 June 1967 in Salford) is an English operatic soprano.

She studied at Chetham's School of Music in Manchester and the Guildhall School of Music and Drama in London and made her operatic debut in 1990 singing Pamina in The Magic Flute for English Touring Opera. She subsequently debuted at Glyndebourne Festival Opera in Death in Venice and the Royal Opera, London in The Marriage of Figaro. Her debut at the Welsh National Opera came in June 1996 when she created the role of The Child in the world premiere of Peter Maxwell Davies' opera, The Doctor of Myddfai. She went on to perform in the world premieres of two other works by Maxwell Davies:

- The Jacobite Rising – for orchestra, chorus and vocal soloists (soprano, mezzo-soprano, tenor and baritone). The work was commissioned to commemorate the 250th anniversary of the second Jacobite rising (1745-6) and was first performed on 15 October 1997 at the City Halls, Glasgow.
- Sea Elegy – for orchestra, chorus and vocal soloists (soprano, mezzo-soprano, tenor and baritone). A setting of four elegies by the poet George Mackay Brown, the work was commissioned by the Scottish Chamber Orchestra to celebrate its 25th anniversary. It was first performed on 3 December 1998 at Queen's Hall, Edinburgh.

Amongst the other premieres in which she has sung are the title role in the London premiere of Michael Berkeley's Jane Eyre (Linbury Studio, Royal Opera House, November 2000) and the role of Madame Vitalie Rimbaud in the world premiere of Rimbaud, la parole libérée by Marco-Antonio Perez-Ramirez. (Opéra National de Montpellier, 29 March 2007).

== Recording ==
- The Doctor of Myddfai (Paul Whelan, Lisa Tyrrell, Gynne Howell et al.; Welsh National Opera Orchestra and Chorus; Richard Armstrong, conductor) Recorded live, 5 October 1996. Label: Collins Classics 70462
