= Psappha (ensemble) =

English classical music group from Manchester

Psappha was an ensemble of contemporary classical musicians based in Manchester in the North West of England, specialised in the performance of works by living composers. Founded in 1991 by artistic director Tim Williams, the ensemble moved into a new home in 2015, St Michael's, Ancoats, Manchester. The ensemble had a core instrumentation of flute, clarinet, piano, percussion, violin, viola and cello.

Psappha closed in November 2023 due to Arts Council England withdrawing 100% of its regular funding to the ensemble.

== Association with Peter Maxwell Davies ==
Their patron until his death in March 2016 was Sir Peter Maxwell Davies. Davies was earlier associated with the Fires of London, a group which disbanded in 1987. The Fires formed in the 1960s to play Arnold Schoenberg's Pierrot lunaire (1912) and new works with a similar scoring. Psappha has performed Davies' works for Pierrot ensemble, such as Missa super l'homme armé (1968, rev. 1971) and Eight Songs for a Mad King (1969), which were premiered by the Fires. Psappha also premiered later compositions by Davies, including Mr Emmet Takes a Walk (2000).

== Discography ==
A CD of Eight Songs for a Mad King and Miss Donnithorne's Maggot was described in the Guardian as possessing "wonderful clarity and dramatic immediacy".
