= Chinese Lessons =

Book by John Pomfret

Chinese Lessons: Five Classmates and the Story of the New China (Henry Holt and Co. 2006 (ISBN 0805086641) is a book by John Pomfret. first published by Henry Holt and Co. on 8 August 2006. Pomfret recounts his experiences and perspectives about the then opening China during his attendance at Nanjing University from 1980 to 1983, during one of the first student exchange programs between the United States and China. He follows the careers of five of his classmates to show the changes in China in a time of basic change.

== Background ==
After the opening of China following the State visit of Deng Xiaoping to the United States, the two countries agreed on educational exchange. Pomfret was among the first students to go to China, studying there from 1980 to 1983. He returned to China after several years for the Associated Press, for which he covered the Tiananmen Massacre of 1989. He wrote the book after becoming Beijing Bureau Chief for the Washington Post from 1998 to 2003.

He noted in the book, “China has had a great run since the Tiananmen Square crackdown,” but "it has destroyed its traditions, and “the current vacuum in everyday morality hampers everything.” Orville Schell, reviewing the book in the New York Times, writes that "What makes this book particularly rewarding is that Pomfret not only describes China today, he also reminds us what came before, thereby posing the important question: Is it possible for China to avoid reckoning with its past and still become a responsible, possibly great, nation?"

== Content ==
The book is part reporting, part memoir, telling the stories of five of Pomfret's classmates against the background of a changing China. The book tells their background and their experiences over the next decades.

== Reception ==
The book received positive reviews in major American newspapers, such as The New York Times. The extensive Washington Monthly review said "the stories are vivid, and the book is expertly constructed."
