= David Pountney =

British-Polish theatre and opera director and librettist (born 1947)

Sir David Pountney CBE
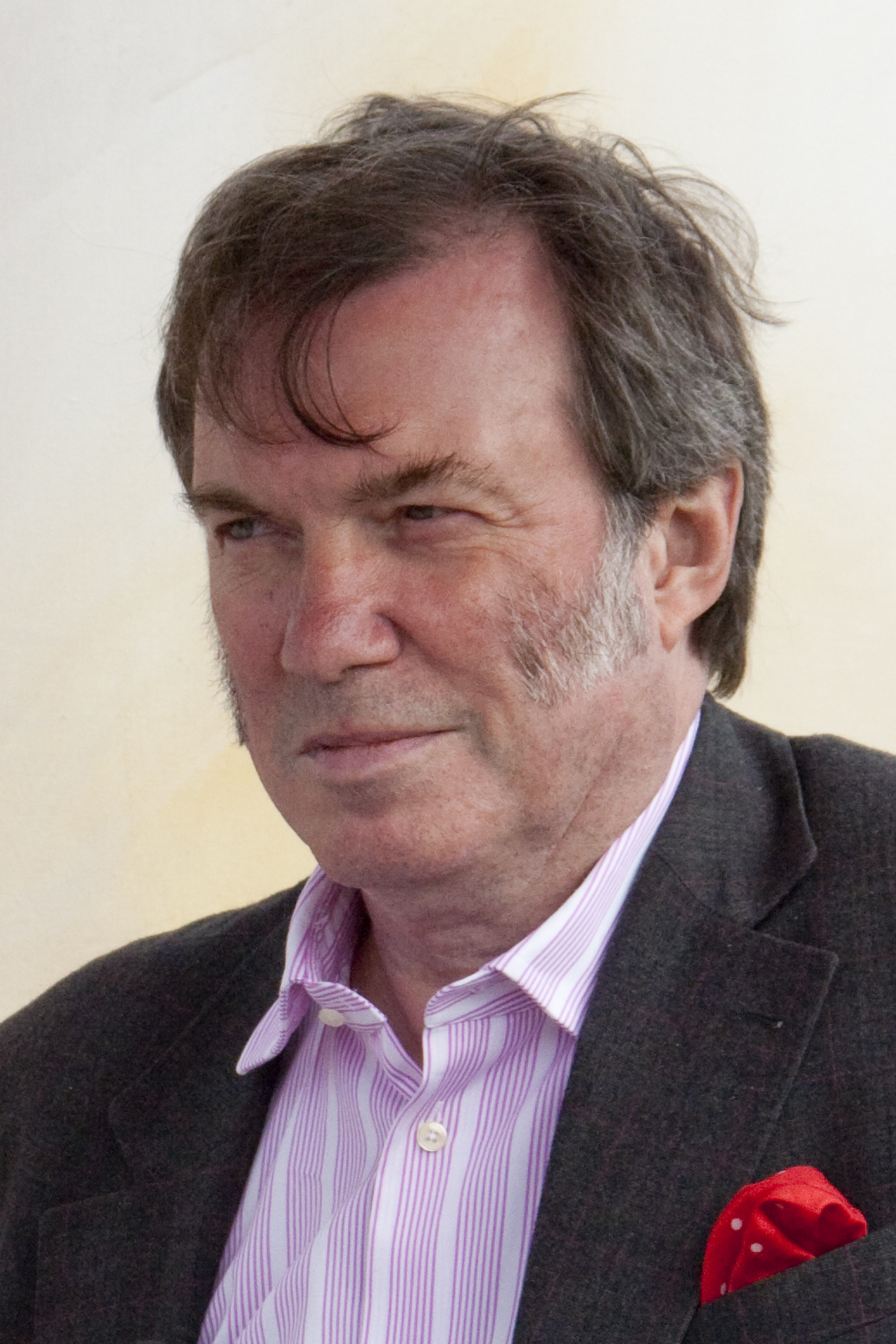
- Pountney in 2009
- Born: David Willoughby Pountney; 10 September 1947 (age 78)
- Occupations: Theatre director and librettist
- Notable work: The Doctor of Myddfai (1996); Mr Emmet Takes a Walk (2000); Kommilitonen! (2011)

Sir David Willoughby Pountney CBE (born 10 September 1947) is a British-Polish theatre and opera director and librettist internationally known for his productions of rarely performed operas and new productions of classic works. He has directed over ten world premières, including three by Sir Peter Maxwell Davies for whom he wrote the librettos of The Doctor of Myddfai, Mr Emmet Takes a Walk and Kommilitonen!

== Biography ==
Pountney was born in Oxford and was a chorister at St John's College, Cambridge (1956–61). He was then educated near Oxford at Radley College (1961–66) before returning to St John's College, Cambridge to read for his degree.

His first major breakthrough came in 1972 with his production of Káťa Kabanová for the Wexford Festival. From 1975 to 1980, he was the Director of Productions at Scottish Opera, and, from 1982 to 1993, Director of Productions at English National Opera, where he directed over twenty operas. From 1993 to 2004, he worked as a free-lance director at the Zurich Opera, the Vienna State Opera, the Bavarian State Opera in Munich, and other houses in America, Japan, and the United Kingdom. He has also directed at De Nederlandse Opera and Opera Australia. In December 2003 he became the Intendant of the Bregenz Festival, a post he held until 2014. In April 2011 he was named head of the Welsh National Opera with his appointment as chief executive and artistic director to begin in September 2011.

He has worked as a librettist for Sir Peter Maxwell Davies on The Doctor of Myddfai, Mr Emmet Takes a Walk and Kommilitonen!, and has translated opera librettos into English from Russian, Czech, German, and Italian.

He wrote the libretto for and directed Elena Langer's opera Figaro Gets a Divorce, which was premiered at the Welsh National Opera in February 2016. To great critical acclaim he directed Zandonai's Francesca da Rimini at La Scala Opera House, Milan in 2018. Later that year at Strasbourg he directed Kurt Weill and Arnold Schoenberg in Das Mahagonny Songspiel, Pierrot Lunaire and Die 7 Todsunden.

== Honours ==
Pountney is a Chevalier of the Ordre des Arts et des Lettres (a French civilian honour), has the Cavalier's Cross of the Order of Merit of the Republic of Poland and was awarded the Ehrenkreuz des Bundes Österreich in 2014.

He was appointed Commander of the Order of the British Empire (CBE) in 1994 and was knighted in the 2019 Birthday Honours for services to opera.

He is a Patron of Bampton Classical Opera.

== Selected productions ==
- Janáček cycle: Jenůfa, From the House of the Dead, The Makropulos Case, Káťa Kabanová, and The Cunning Little Vixen (Scottish Opera, in collaboration with the Welsh National Opera)
- Toussaint (by David Blake; 1977, English National Opera, première)
- Rusalka (English National Opera)
- Osud (English National Opera)
- The Midsummer Marriage (English National Opera)
- Doktor Faust (English National Opera)
- Lady Macbeth of Mtsensk (English National Opera)
- Königskinder (English National Opera)
- Hänsel und Gretel (English National Opera)
- The Adventures of Mr Broucek (English National Opera)
- The Fairy Queen (English National Opera)
- Julietta (Opera North)
- The Greek Passion (Bregenz Festival)
- Masquerade (Bregenz Festival, and also Royal Opera House, Covent Garden, in Fall 2005)
- Der Kuhhandel / Arms and the Cow (Bregenz Festival and Opera North)
- King Roger (Bregenz Festival and Gran Teatre del Liceu, Barcelona) (2009)
- The Passenger (Bregenz Festival 2010)
- Macbeth (Zurich Opera) (2001)
- The Masque of Might (Opera North) (2023)

== Sources ==
- Baumgartner, Edwin (22 July 2009). "David Pountney, der Herr der Seebühne" ("David Pountney, The Lord of the Lake Stage"). Wiener Zeitung (in German)
- BBC News (1 April 2011). "David Pountney to head Welsh National Opera"
- Clements, Andrew (21 January 2002). "Review: Mr Emmet Takes a Walk". The Guardian
- Christiansen, Rupert (22 March 2011). "Review: Kommilitonen!, Royal Academy of Music. The Daily Telegraph
- Der Standard (11 March 2004). "Wider die kulturelle Polarisierung" ("Against Cultural Polarization")
- White, Michael (14 July 1996). "Hits, myths and a pair of icons". The Independent
