= The Seven Deadly Sins (ballet chanté) =

1933 satirical sung ballet

Die sieben Todsünden The Seven Deadly Sins
- Sung ballet by Kurt Weill
- Cover of a recording with Lotte Lenya
- Description: satirical ballet chanté
- Librettist: Bertolt Brecht
- Language: German
- Premiere: 7 June 1933; Théâtre des Champs-Élysées, Paris

The Seven Deadly Sins (German: Die sieben Todsünden, French: Les sept péchés capitaux) is a satirical ballet chanté ("sung ballet") in seven scenes (nine movements, including a Prologue and Epilogue) composed by Kurt Weill to a German libretto by Bertolt Brecht in 1933 under a commission from Boris Kochno and Edward James. It was translated into English by W. H. Auden and Chester Kallman and more recently by Michael Feingold. It was the last major collaboration between Weill and Brecht.

== Origins ==
With the Nazi seizure of power following the Reichstag fire of 27 February 1933, Brecht and Weill–especially Weill as a Jew–recognized that Berlin could no longer serve as their artistic home. Brecht left Berlin and traveled to Paris, stayed briefly in Prague, and then in Vienna. Less than a month later he was in Zurich and then moved to less expensive lodgings in Lugano, Switzerland. There a patron offered him living quarters in his summer home in Carona, outside Lugano. Weill spent time in Paris in December 1932, where he obtained the commission for the Seven Deadly Sins. He contacted Brecht in Carona and Brecht promptly joined him in Paris. The scenario of the libretto mirrors Brecht's own travels, expanded to one-year sojourns in each of seven cities.

== Performance history ==
Kurt Weill was commissioned to compose Die sieben Todsünden by Edward James, a wealthy Englishman who had been in Paris during Weill's visit in December 1932. James's wife, Tilly Losch, was a ballerina who James described as having a striking resemblance to Weill's wife, Lotte Lenya. Because James knew that Weill was going to write for Lenya, he included language in the contract commissioning the work requiring that his wife, Losch, dance opposite her lookalike. This dictated the complicated split personality plot before Bertolt Brecht was even asked to write the libretto.

The Seven Deadly Sins premiered in the Théâtre des Champs-Élysées in Paris on 7 June 1933. It was produced, directed and choreographed by George Balanchine with mise en scène by Caspar Neher. The lead roles were played by Lotte Lenya (Anna I) and Tilly Losch (Anna II). According to Nils Grosch, it "was met with bewilderment by the French audience (not just because the work was sung entirely in German). German émigrés living in Paris, however, were enthusiastic and considered it 'a grand evening.'" The production went to London and opened at the Savoy Theatre under the title Anna-Anna on 28 June of the same year, performed in an impromptu translation by Lenya.

The work was revived by Weill's widow Lenya in the 1950s, with the main singing part transposed to a fourth below its original pitch level in order to allow her to perform her original role. Another version transposed down a full octave was used by Marianne Faithfull in her 1997 recording. The original version has been recorded by, among others, Anne Sofie von Otter, Teresa Stratas, and Anja Silja.

== Major productions ==
in German unless otherwise noted

- June 7, 1933, Paris, Théâtre des Champs-Elysées; George Balanchine, choreographer; Maurice Abravanel, conductor.
- December 4, 1958, City Center, New York City Ballet; George Balanchine, choreographer; Robert Irving, conductor; Anna I (singer), Lotte Lenya; Anna II (dancer), Allegra Kent (in English).
- June 15, 1976, Wuppertal, Wuppertaler Tanzwoche; Pina Bausch, choreographer; Frank Meiswinkel, conductor.
- December 23, 1987, Lyon, Lyon Opéra-Ballet; Maguy Marin, choreographer; Kent Nagano, conductor.
- March 15, 1997, New York State Theater, City Opera, Anne Bogart, director, Derrick Inouye, conductor.
- April 26, 2007, London, Royal Ballet; Martha Wainwright, Zenaida Yanowsky, Marianela Núñez; director / choreographer Will Tuckett; Martin Yates conductor.
- March 17, 2008, Cuenca (Spain) Semana de Música Religiosa de Cuenca; Mary Carewe, Anna; Tenebrae Vocal Soloists, family; Catherine Allard, dancer, choreographer; María Araujo, costumes; Mariona Omedes, video production; Frederic Amat, stage director; Joven Orquesta Nacional de España; José Luis Estelles, conductor.
- May 11, 2011, New York City Ballet, Patti LuPone, Wendy Whelan, Sara Mearns, Craig Hall; choreographer Lynne Taylor-Corbett
- November 2014, Stockholm, Svenska Kammarorkestern; Angelika Kirchschlager, Anna, HK Gruber conductor
- June 14, 2017, Toronto, Toronto Symphony Orchestra; Wallis Giunta, Anna; Jennifer Nichols, choreographer; Joel Ivany, director; Peter Oundjian, conductor.
- July 6, 2017, Seville, Teatro de la Maestranza, Real Orquesta Sinfónica de Sevilla; Wallis Giunta, Anna/director; John Axelrod conductor.
- February 2019, Stuttgart, Staatstheater Stuttgart; Peaches, Anna; Stefan Schreiber, conductor.
- November 21, 2020, Leeds, Opera North; Wallis Giunta, Anna I; Shelley Eva Haden, Anna II; Gary Clarke, choreographer/director; James Holmes, conductor.
- September 27, 2022, Buenos Aires, Teatro Colón; Stephanie Wake Edwards, Anna I; Hannah Rudd, Anna II; Sophie Hunter, stage director; Ann Yee, choreographer; Jan Latham-Koenig, conductor.

== Roles ==
Role	Voice type	Premiere cast, (Conductor: Maurice Abravanel)
Anna I	Soprano	Lotte Lenya
Anna II	—N/a (dancer)	Tilly Losch
Brother	Baritone	Albert Peters
Mother	Bass	Heinrich Gretler
Father	first tenor	Otto Pasetti
Brother	second tenor	Erich Fuchs

== Synopsis ==
The Seven Deadly Sins tells the story of two sisters, Anna I and Anna II. Anna I, the singer, is the principal vocal role. Anna II, the dancer, is heard only infrequently and the text hints at the possibility that the two Annas are the same person: "To convey the ambivalence inherent in the 'sinner', Brecht splits the personality of Anna into Anna I, the cynical impresario with a practical sense and conscience, and Anna II, the emotional, impulsive, artistic beauty, the salable product with an all too human heart." Anna I sings:

She's the one with the looks. I'm realistic. She's just a little mad, my head is on straight. But we're really one divided being, even though you see two of us. And both of us are Anna. Together we've but a single past, a single future, one heart and one savings account and we only do what suits each other best. Right Anna?

"The Family", a male quartet, fills the role of a Greek chorus. They refer to Anna as a single daughter of the family, making a verbal allusion to her divided nature: "Will our Anna pull herself together?" The sisters set out from the banks of the Mississippi River in Louisiana to find their fortune in the big cities, intending to send their family enough money to build a little house on the river. After the prologue, in which Anna I introduces the sisters and their plans, each of seven scenes is devoted to one of the seven deadly sins, each encountered in a different American city:

1. Prologue
2. Faulheit / Sloth (city unnamed)
3. Stolz / Pride (Memphis)
4. Zorn / Wrath (Los Angeles)
5. Völlerei / Gluttony (Philadelphia)
6. Unzucht / Lust (Boston)
7. Habsucht / Greed (Tennessee, in posthumous versions Baltimore)
8. Neid / Envy (San Francisco)
9. Epilogue (home, in the new little house)

While securing the means to build the little house over the course of seven years, Anna II envies those who can engage in the sins she must abjure. The epilogue ends on a sober note, as Anna II responds with resignation to her sister: "Yes, Anna."

== Satire ==
The libretto is satirical. When Anna II tries to behave morally she is scolded by her alter ego and her family for committing one of the seven sins. For instance, Anna I objects that Anna II is too proud to perform as a cabaret dancer just to please her clientele and needs to abandon her pride and satisfy her clients' lust. When Anna II is angry at injustice, Anna I advises her to exercise self-control. She's advised as well to be faithful to the wealthy man who pays her for love and not share her earnings with the man she loves. Anna II repeatedly surrenders to Anna I with the words "It's right like this." In the case of the last of the seven sins, Anna I warns Anna II not to be envious of people who live as she would like to, "of those who pass the time at their ease and in comfort; those too proud to be bought; of those whose wrath is kindled by injustice; those who act upon their impulses happily; lovers true to their loved ones; and those who take what they need without shame."

== Recordings ==
- Dancing on a Volcano (Musik Zwischen 1920 und 1933)/Die sieben Todsünden, Wallis Giunta, Ensemble Modern, HK Gruber, EM Media EMCD-053 (2026)
- Weill: The Seven Deadly Sins, Wallis Giunta, Swedish Chamber Orchestra, HK Gruber, BIS 12534932 (2025)
- Die sieben Todsünden, Angelina Réaux, New York Philharmonic, Kurt Masur, Warner Classics (1993) (Reissued 2022 as part of Kurt Masur: The Complete Warner Classics Edition - His Teldec & EMI Classics Recordings.)
- Die Sieben Todsünden (The Seven Deadly Sins), Ballet, Anja Silja, SWR Rundfunkorchester Kaiserslautern, Grzegorz Nowak, Hänssler Classic – CD SWR Music 93.109 (2004)
- The Seven Deadly Sins, Songs, Marianne Faithfull, Vienna Radio Symphony Orchestra, Dennis Russell Davies conducting, Sung in English. Reverso/RCA Victor 74321 601192. (Reissued 2004 as RCA Red Seal 82876-60872-2.)
- Lotte Lenya sings Kurt Weill's The Seven Deadly Sins & Berlin Theatre Songs Sony (1997)
- Die Sieben Todsünden (The Seven Deadly Sins)/Mahagonny Songspiel Ute Lemper, RIAS Berlin Sinfonietta, John Mauceri, Decca 430 168-2 (1990)
- Die sieben Todsünden; Chansons, Brigitte Fassbaender, NDR Radiophilharmonie Hannover, Cord Garben (HMA 1951420)
- Weill Symphony No. 2/The Seven Deadly Sins/Songs, Elise Ross, City of Birmingham Symphony Orchestra conducted by Simon Rattle Warner Classics 6971852 (2 CDs)
- Die sieben Todsünden, Gisela May; Rundfunk-Sinfonieorchester Leipzig; Herbert Kegel conducting, Polydor 429 333-2.; Deutsche Grammophon 139308
- Speak Low. Songs by Kurt Weill & The Seven Deadly Sins, Anne Sofie von Otter, NDR-Sinfonieorchester conducted by Sir John Eliot Gardiner; Deutsche Grammophon E4398942
- The Kurt Weill Album, Katharine Mehrling, Konzerthausorchester Berlin Joana Mallwitz, Deutsche Grammophon 508353
- Detroit Symphony Orchestra with Storm Large
