= Outburst Queer Arts Festival =

LGBTQ film festival in Northern Ireland

- Genre: Arts festival
- Dates: November/December
- Locations: Belfast, Northern Ireland
- Years active: 2007–present
- Website: Outburst Queer Arts website

The Outburst Queer Arts Festival is an annual queer arts festival in Northern Ireland. It involves ten days of film, music, debate, literature, visual art, theatre and other performances from local and international LGBT artists and performers. Festival events are held at several venues in Belfast. Started in 2007, the festival marked its 10th anniversary in 2016. The 17th edition of the festival was held in November 2023.

== History ==
The Outburst Queer Arts Festival is an annual queer arts festival in Northern Ireland. It involves ten days of film, music, debate, literature, visual art, theatre and other performances from local and international LGBT artists and performers. Festival events are held at several venues in Belfast.

Started in 2007, it marked its 10th anniversary in 2016. The 17th edition of the festival was held in November 2023. In 2024 the festival ran from November 15 to 23, and included more than thirty events. One event was a collaboration with Ulster Presents to host Mixtape #1, with Phil Collins, a graduate of Belfast School of Art. It also included the premier of a play, Suspect Device, about the life of transgender bus driver Wilma Creith, who died in 1980 and is considered a 'pioneering figure in the Belfast trans scene'. Creith set up a helpline and support group for Belfast trans people in 1977. The play was staged on a vintage Ulster bus.

The festival has previously received funding from the Department for Social Development, Belfast City Council and National Lottery sources. The festival artistic director is Ruth McCarthy, and the chairperson is David Codling.
