= John Pomfret (journalist) =

American journalist and writer (born 1959)

- Born: 1959 (age 66–67); Milwaukee, Wisconsin
- Education: Stanford University, Nanjing University
- Occupations: journalist, writer
- Employer: The Washington Post
- Spouse: Zhang Mei

John Pomfret (born 1959) is an American journalist and writer.

== Biography ==
Pomfret was born in Milwaukee, Wisconsin in 1959, and raised in New York City. He attended Stanford University, receiving his B.A. and M.A. in East Asian Studies. In 1980, he was one of the first American students to go to China and study at Nanjing University. Between 1983 and 1984 he attended Singapore’s Institute of Southeast Asian Studies as a Fulbright Scholar, researching the Cambodian conflict.

He started his journalistic career at the Stanford Daily as a photographer. After that he worked at a newspaper in Riverside County, California, and after a year was hired by the Associated Press to work in New York City, covering the graveyard shift.

After two years with the AP in New York, in 1988, he was sent to China as a foreign correspondent, thanks to his knowledge of Mandarin and his Asian studies background. There he covered the 1989 student protests in Beijing, after which he was expelled from China because of alleged links with student ringleaders. He then worked in Bosnia, the Democratic Republic of Congo, Rwanda, Sri Lanka, Afghanistan, Iraq, Turkey and Iran. Hired by the Washington Post in 1992, for more than 15 years Pomfret covered the armed conflicts in these countries and the politics of the post-Cold War era. He later served as the editor of The Washington Post′s weekend opinion section, Outlook.

During his career, he received several awards, including 2003's Osborne Elliot Prize for the best coverage of Asia by the Asia Society and 2007's Shorenstein Prize for coverage of Asia. In 1996, he was a Pulitzer Prize finalist in International Reporting for his work in Congo.

The experiences he had when he attended Nanjing University, and his perspective of the Chinese opening, are narrated in his 2006 book Chinese Lessons: Five Classmates and the Story of the New China.

Pomfret won an Alicia Patterson Journalism Fellowship in 2004 writing about education in China. In 2011, he was awarded the Edward Weintal Award for Diplomatic Reporting from Georgetown University for his work covering America's relations with China. He was a Fulbright senior scholar in China in 2013, where he researched a book on the interactions between Americans and Chinese. That book, The Beautiful Country and the Middle Kingdom, was published in November 2016. It won the 2017 Arthur Ross Book Award given by the Council on Foreign Relations. Pomfret's third book, From Warsaw with Love: Polish Spies, the CIA, and the Forging an Unlikely Alliance, was published in October 2021 to critical acclaim.

He speaks, reads and writes Mandarin, and speaks French, Japanese, and Serbo-Croatian. He lives near Berkeley, California with his wife Zhang Mei and family.

== Works ==
- From Warsaw With Love: Polish Spies, the CIA, and the Forging of an Unlikely Alliance. Holt Paperbacks. 2021. ISBN 978-1250296054.
- Chinese Lessons: Five Classmates and the Story of the New China. Holt Paperbacks. 2006. ISBN 0-8050-8664-1.
- The Beautiful Country and the Middle Kingdom: America and China, 1776 to the Present. Henry Holt and Co. 2016. ISBN 978-0805092509.
