= Islam in Australia =

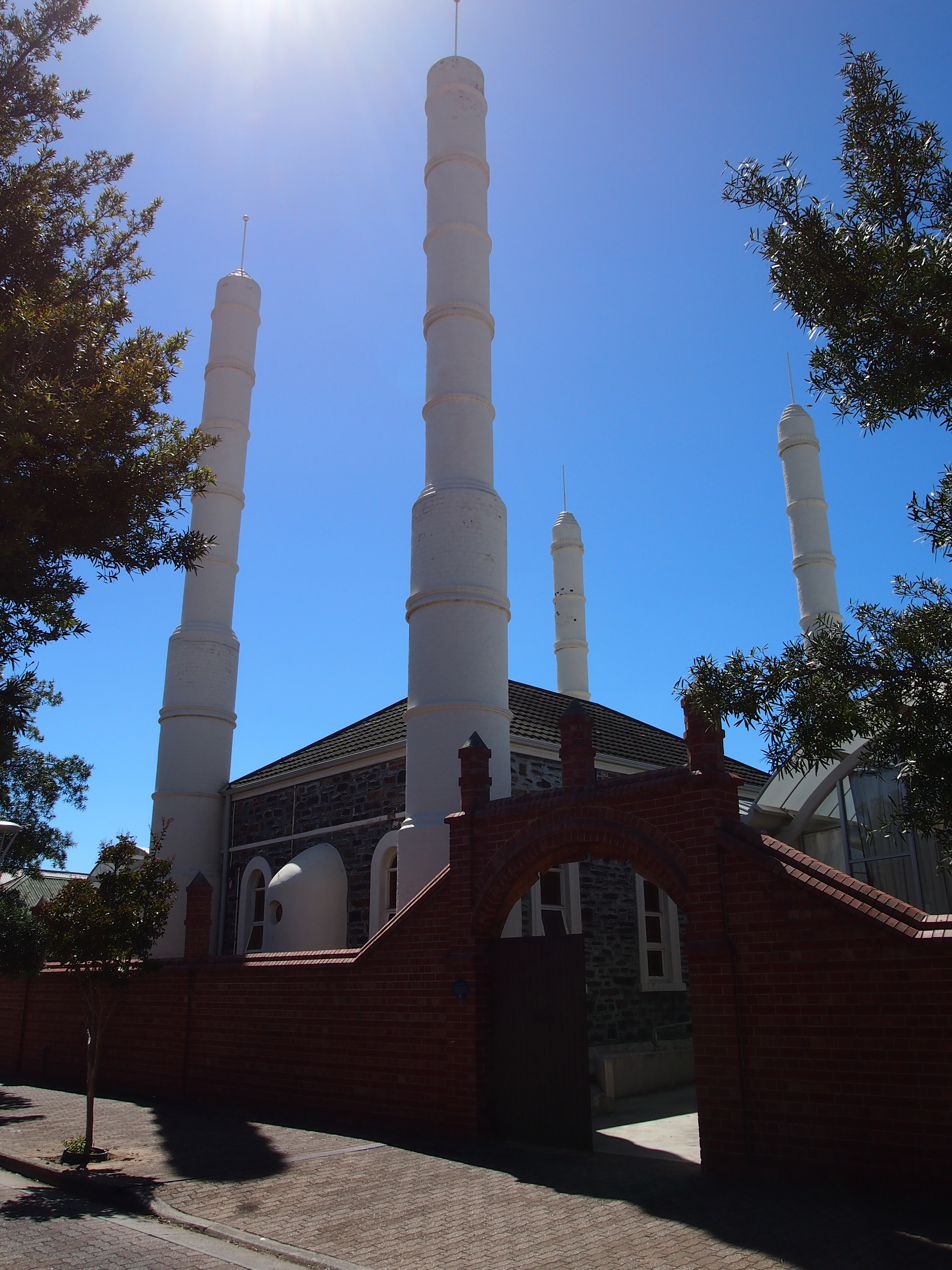
- The Adelaide Mosque in Adelaide, South Australia, is amongst the oldest mosques in Australia having been built in 1888-89

Total population
- c. 813,392 (2021 Census)

Islam is the second-largest religion in Australia. According to the 2021 Census in Australia, the combined number of people who self-identified as Australian Muslims, from all forms of Islam, constituted 813,392 people, or 3.2% of the total Australian population. That total Muslim population makes Islam, in all its denominations and sects, the second largest religious grouping in Australia, after all denominations of Christianity (43.9%, also including non-practising cultural Christians).

Demographers attribute Muslim community growth trends during the most recent census period to relatively high birth rates, and recent immigration patterns. Adherents of Islam represent the majority of the population in Cocos (Keeling) Islands, an external territory of Australia.

The vast majority of Muslims in Australia are Sunni, with significant minorities belonging to the Shia denomination. The followers of each of these are further split along different Madhhab (schools of thought within Islamic jurisprudence for the interpretation and practice of Islamic law) and sub-sect. There are also practitioners of other smaller denominations of Islam such as Ibadi Muslim Australians of Omani descent, and approximately 20,000 Druze Australians whose religion emerged as an offshoot of Islam which arrived in Australia with the immigration of Druze mainly from Lebanon and Syria. There are also Sufi (Islamic mysticism) minorities among Muslim practitioners in Australia.

While the overall Australian Muslim community is defined largely by a common religious identity, Australia's Muslims are not a monolithic community. The Australian Muslim community has traditional sectarian divisions and is also extremely diverse racially, ethnically, culturally and linguistically. Different Muslim groups within the Australian Muslim community thus also espouse parallel non-religious ethnic identities with related non-Muslim counterparts, either within Australia or abroad.

== History ==
=== Prior to 1860 ===
Contact between northern Australia and the Makassan trepang (sea cucumber) traders from Sulawesi is well documented from at least the 18th century, and some scholars suggest it may have begun earlier. Islam arrived in Sulawesi, Indonesia, in the early 17th century when the kingdom of Luwu converted to Islam, followed quickly by the Makassar kingdoms of Gowa and Talloq in 1605. Anthropologist Ian McIntosh has recorded Warramiri oral traditions in north-east Arnhem Land referring to a spiritual being called Walitha’walitha, which some elders interpret as related to the Arabic phrase Allah ta’ala (“God, the exalted”). According to McIntosh, this figure features in a ceremony known as the Wurramu, which the Warramiri share with the Makassan, although in the Aboriginal context it functions as a mortuary ritual. He notes that elders describe the ceremony on one level as reflecting contact with foreign visitors, and on another as addressing the passage of the soul of the deceased to a heavenly realm.

=== Makassan contact with Australia ===
While Islam arrived in South Sulawesi, Indonesia, until the early 17th century through the efforts of three scholars from Minangkabau, Sumatra, known as the Dato' Tallua, Indonesian trepangers from the southwest corner of Sulawesi were already visiting the coast of northern Australia, "from at least the eighteenth century" to collect and process trepang, a marine invertebrate prized for its culinary and medicinal values in Chinese markets. Remnants of their influence can be seen in the culture of some of the northern Aboriginal peoples. Regina Ganter, an associate professor at Griffith University, says, "Staying on the safe grounds of historical method ... the beginning of the trepang industry in Australia [can be dated] to between the 1720s and 1750s, although this does not preclude earlier, less organised contact." Ganter also writes "the cultural imprint on the Yolngu people of this contact is everywhere: in their language, in their art, in their stories, in their cuisine." According to anthropologist John Bradley from Monash University, the contact between the two groups was a success: "They traded together. It was fair - there was no racial judgement, no race policy." Even into the early 21st century, the shared history between the two peoples is still celebrated by Aboriginal communities in Northern Australia as a period of mutual trust and respect.

Others who have studied this period have come to a different conclusion regarding the relationship between the Aboriginal people and the visiting Indonesian trepangers. Anthropologist Ian McIntosh has said that the initial effects of the Macassan fishermen were "terrible", which resulted in "turmoil" with the extent of Islamic influence being "indeterminate". In another paper McIntosh concludes, "strife, poverty and domination . . is a previously unrecorded legacy of contact between Aborigines and Indonesians." A report prepared by the History Department of the Australian National University says that the Macassans appear to have been welcomed initially, however relations deteriorated when, "aborigines began to feel they were being exploited . . leading to violence on both sides".

A number of "Mohammedans" were listed in the musters of 1802, 1811, 1822, and the 1828 census, and a small number of Muslims arrived during the convict period. Beyond this, Muslims generally are not thought to have settled in large numbers in other regions of Australia until 1860.

Muslims were among the earliest settlers of Norfolk Island while the island was used as a British penal colony in the early 19th century. They arrived from 1796, having been employed on British ships. They left following the closure of the penal colony and moved to Tasmania. The community left no remnants; only seven permanent residents of the island identified themselves as "non-Christian" in a 2006 census.

=== 1860 onward: cameleers and pearlers ===
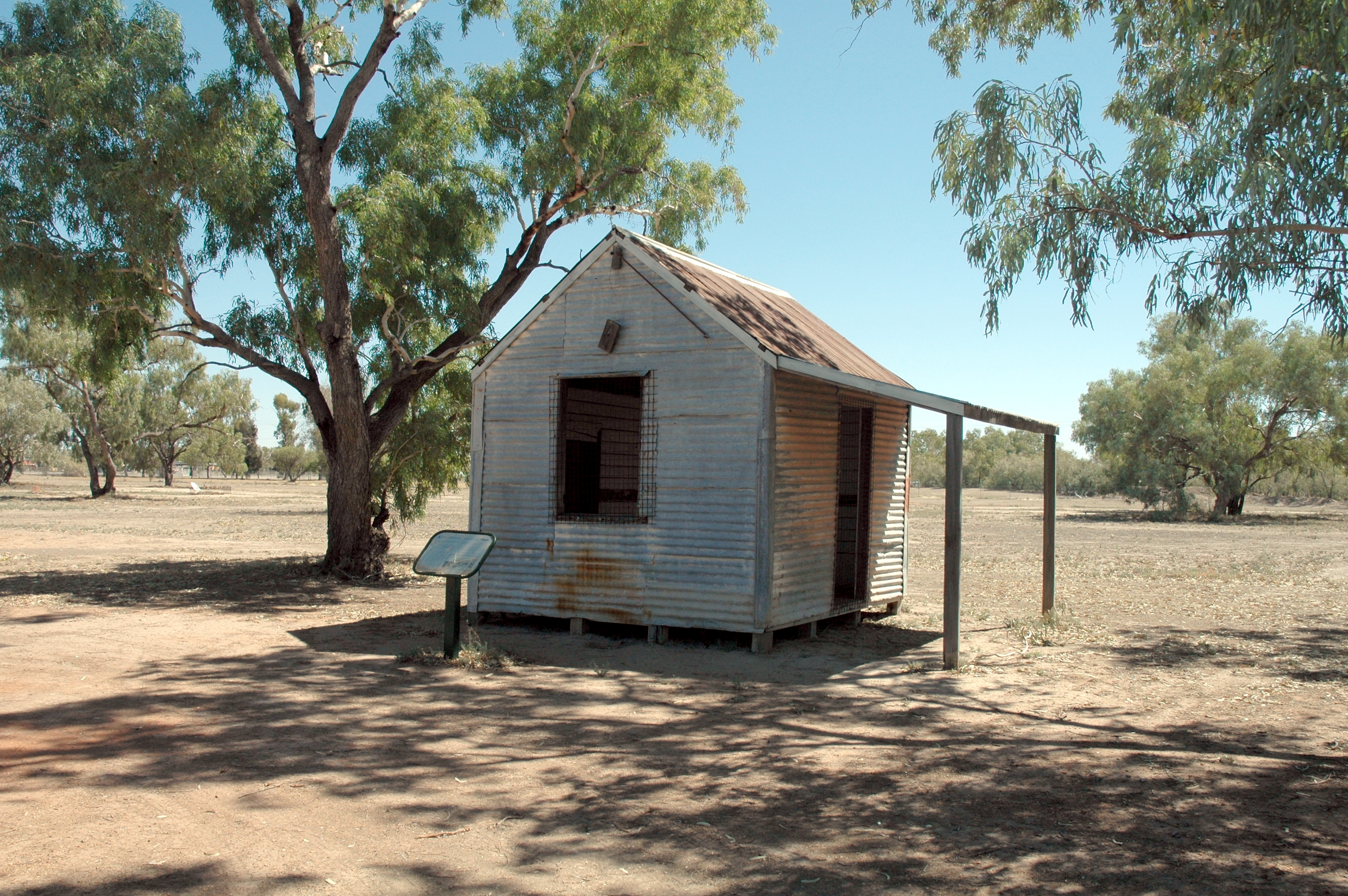
19th-century mosque in cemetery, Bourke, New South Wales

Among the early Muslims were the "Afghan" camel drivers who migrated to and settled in Australia during the mid to late 19th century. Between 1860 and the 1890s a number of Central Asians came to Australia to work as camel drivers.

Camels were first imported into Australia in 1840, initially for exploring the arid interior (see Australian camel), and later for the camel trains that were uniquely suited to the demands of Australia's vast deserts. The first camel drivers arrived in Melbourne, Victoria, in June 1860, when eight Muslims and Hindus arrived with the camels for the Burke and Wills expedition. The next arrival of camel drivers was in 1866 when 31 men from Rajasthan and Baluchistan arrived in South Australia with camels for Thomas Elder. Although they came from several countries, they were usually known in Australia as 'Afghans' and they brought with them the first formal establishment of Islam in Australia.

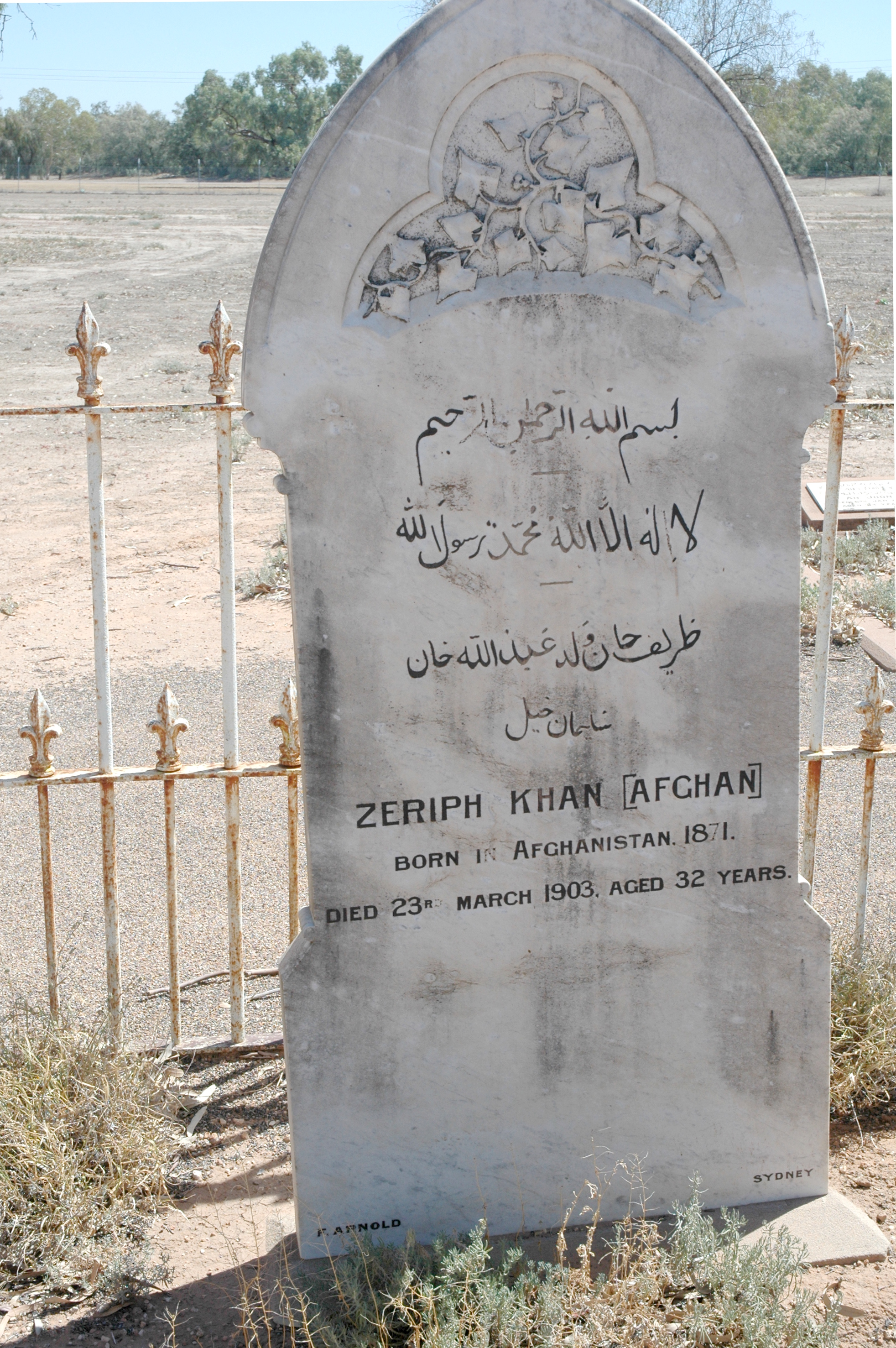
The grave of an Afghan cameleer

Cameleers settled in the areas near Alice Springs and other areas of the Northern Territory and inter-married with the Indigenous population. The Adelaide, South Australia to Darwin, Northern Territory, railway is named The Ghan (short for The Afghan) in their memory.

The first mosque in Australia was built in 1861 at Marree, South Australia. The Great Mosque of Adelaide was built in 1888 by the descendants of the Afghan cameleers. The Broken Hill Mosque at North camel camp was built by the cameleers between 1887 and 1891.

During the 1870s, in slave like conditions, White owned companies brought in Malay Muslims as indentured servants to work on Western Australian and Northern Territory pearling grounds. This was in response to amounting public pressure on the pearling industry, who practiced child kidnapping and forced labour of Aboriginal women, girls, and even pregnant mothers, as they were thought to be the best at diving for pearls. By 1900, 38% of indentured-servant pearl divers were Malay. It is thought that thousands were killed in this industry and are buried in Australia; one cemetery alone of indenture Japanese pearl divers had over 1000 graves, with the average age of mid-20's.

One of the earliest recorded Islamic festivals celebrated in Australia occurred on 23 July 1884 when 70 Muslims assembled for Eid prayers at Albert Park, Melbourne. The Auckland Star noted the ceremony's calm demeanor, stating: "During the whole service the worshippers wore a remarkably reverential aspect."

=== 20th century ===
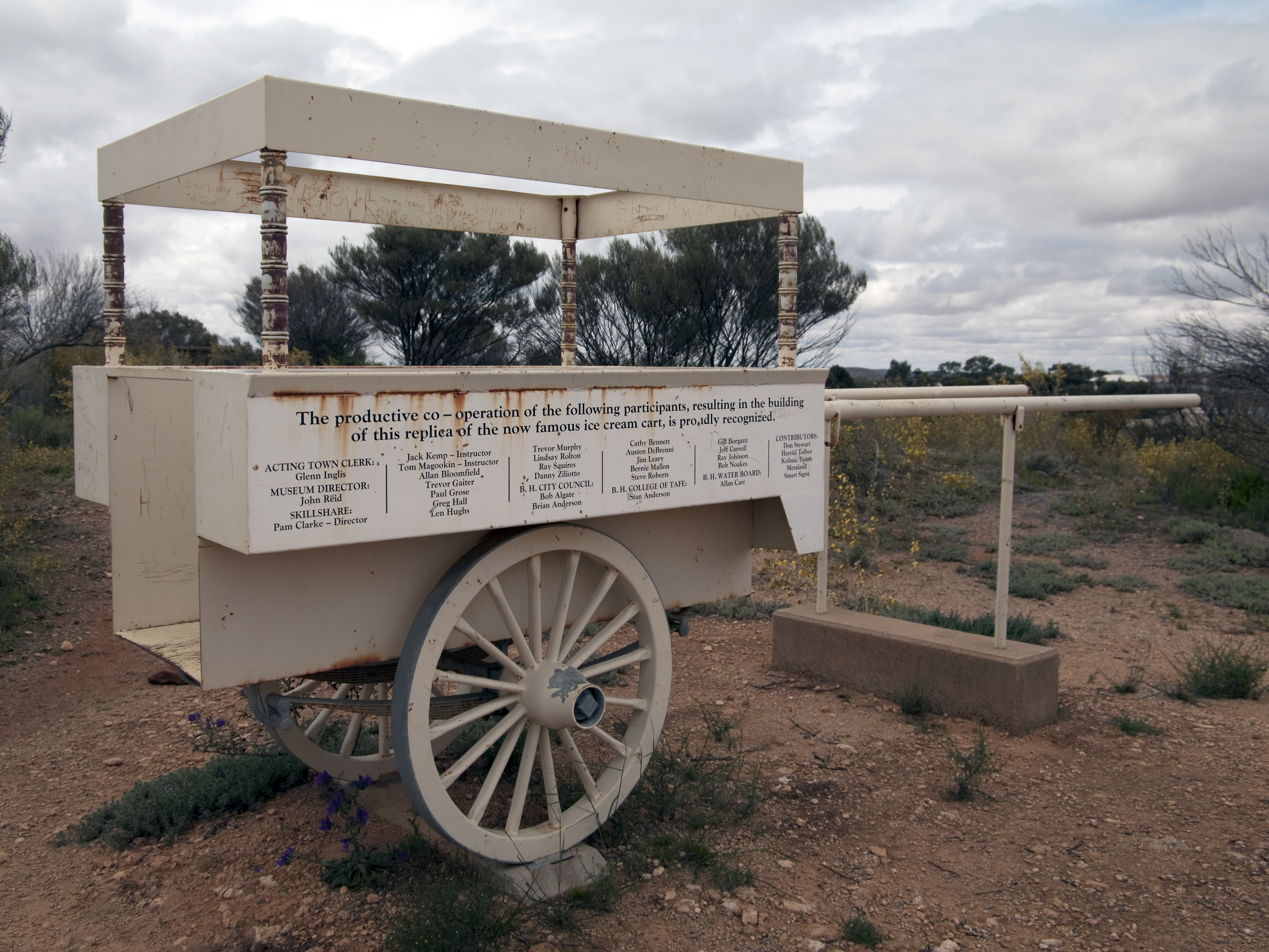
Replica of ice cream van owned by one of the killers in the 1915 "Battle of Broken Hill".

Most of the cameleers returned to their countries after their work had dried up, but a few had brought wives and settled in Australia with their families, and others settled either on their own (some living at the Adelaide Mosque), or married Aboriginal or European women. Halimah Schwerdt, secretary to Mahomet Allum, a former cameleer who established himself as herbalist, healer and philanthropist in Adelaide, became first European woman in Australia to publicly embrace Islam. She was engaged to Allum in 1935-37, but there is no record of a wedding. He married Jean Emsley in 1940, who converted to Islam later. Allam also published pamphlets and articles about Islam.

From 1901, under the provisions of the White Australia policy, immigration to Australia was restricted to persons of white European descent (including white Europeans of the Muslim faith). Meanwhile, persons not of white European heritage (including most Muslims) were denied entry to Australia during this period, and those already settled were not granted Australian citizenship.

Notable events involving Australian Muslims during this early period include what has been described either as an act of war by the Ottoman Empire, or the earliest terrorist attack planned against Australian civilians. The attack was carried out at Broken Hill, New South Wales, in 1915, in what was described as the Battle of Broken Hill. Two Afghans who pledged allegiance to the Ottoman Empire shot and killed four Australians and wounded seven others before being killed by the police.

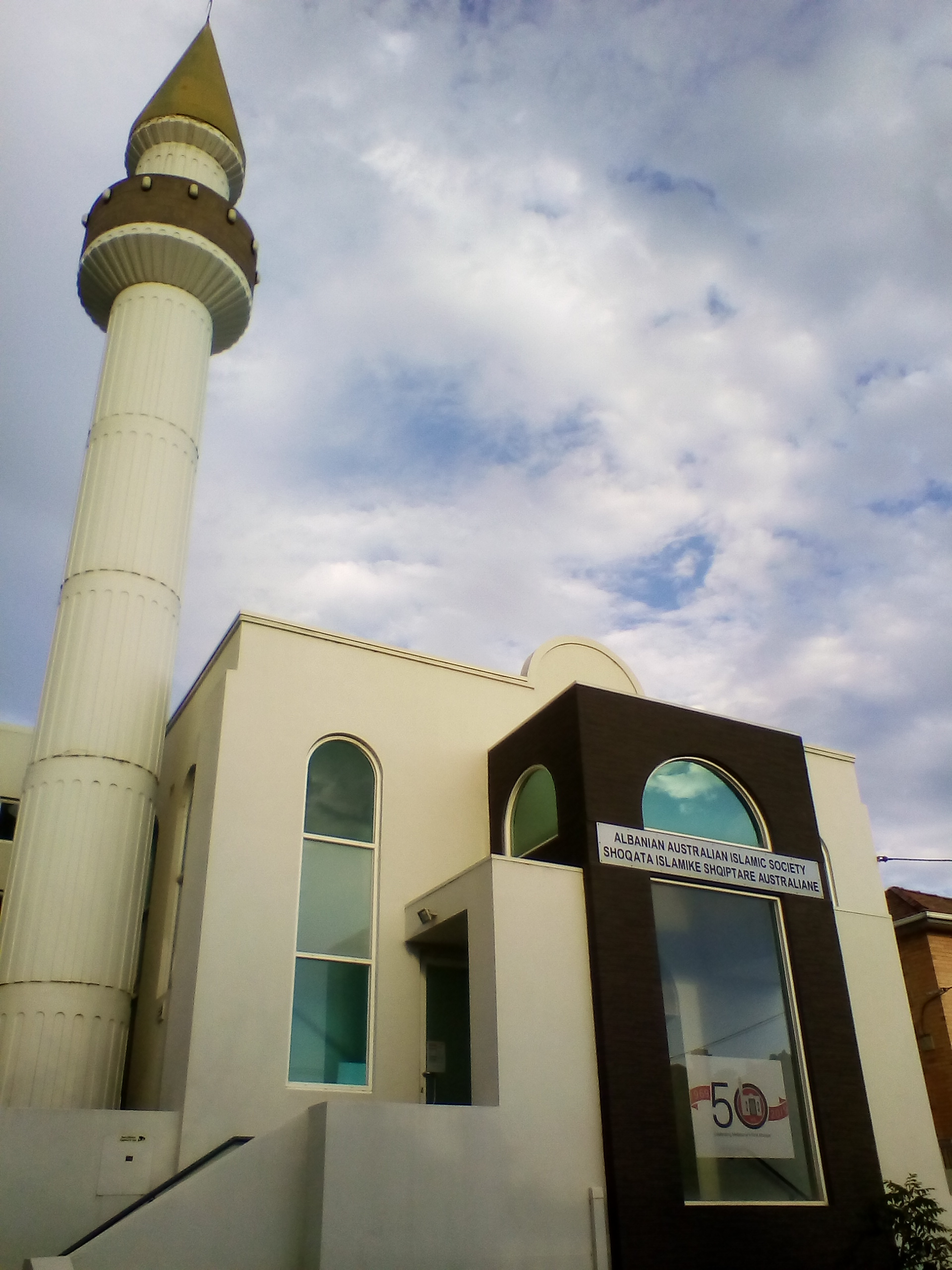
Melbourne's first mosque, built by the Albanian community

In the 1920s and 1930s Albanian Muslims, whose European heritage made them compatible with the White Australia Policy, immigrated to the country. The Albanian arrival revived the Australian Muslim community whose ageing demographics were until that time in decline and Albanians became some of the earliest post-colonial Muslim groups to establish themselves in Australia. Some of the earliest communities with a sizable Albanian Muslim population were Mareeba, Queensland and Shepparton in Victoria.

==== Post-war migration ====
The perceived need for population growth and economic development in Australia led to the broadening of Australia's immigration policy in the post-World War II period. This allowed for the acceptance of a number of displaced white European Muslims who began to arrive from other parts of Europe, mainly from the Balkans, especially from Bosnia and Herzegovina. As with the Albanian Muslim immigrants before them, the European heritage of these displaced Muslims also made them compatible with the White Australia Policy.

Albanians partook in the revival of Islamic life within Australia, in particular toward creating networks and institutions for the community. Albanian Muslims built the first mosque in Shepparton, Victoria (1960), first mosque in Melbourne (1969) and another in 1985, and a mosque in Mareeba, Far North Queensland (1970).

With the increase in immigration of Muslims after the war from countries such as Bosnia, Albania and Kosovo, the Islam in Australia developed its characteristic plurality. The move proved enriching for Muslim migrants, who "met Muslim fellows from many different ethnic, racial, cultural, sectarian and linguistic backgrounds" and "found Islam more pluralistic and more sophisticated" than their countries of origin.

Later, between 1967 and 1971, during the final years of the step-by-step dismantling of the White Australia policy, approximately 10,000 Turkish citizens settled in Australia under an agreement between Australia and Turkey. From the 1970s onwards, there was a significant shift in the government's attitude towards immigration, and with the White Australia policy now totally dismantled from 1973 onwards, instead of trying to make newer foreign nationals assimilate and forgo their heritage, the government became more accommodating and tolerant of differences by adopting a policy of multiculturalism.

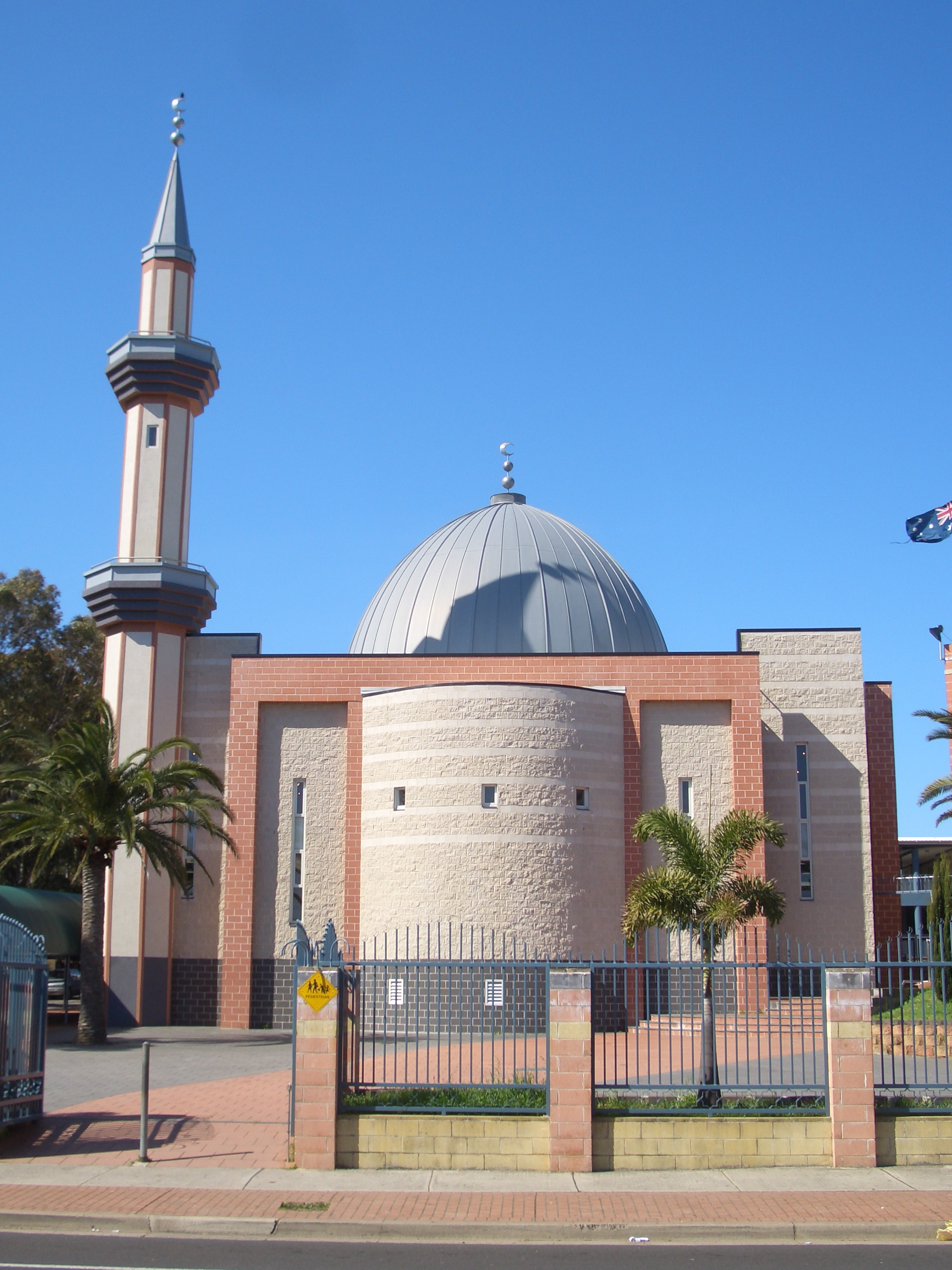
The Chullora Greenacre Mosque

Larger-scale Muslim migration of non-White non-European Muslims began in 1975 with the migration of Lebanese Muslims, which rapidly increased during the Lebanese Civil War from 22,311 or 0.17% of the Australian population in 1971, to 45,200 or 0.33% in 1976. Lebanese Muslims are still the largest and highest-profile Muslim group in Australia, although Lebanese Christians form a majority of Lebanese Australians, outnumbering their Muslim counterparts at a 6-to-4 ratio.

==== 1990s ====
Trade and educational links have been developed between Australia and several Muslim countries. Muslim students from countries such as Malaysia, Indonesia, Bangladesh and Pakistan, are among the thousands of international students studying in Australian universities.

A number of Australian Arabs experienced anti-Arab backlash during the First Gulf War (1990–91). Newspapers received numerous letters calling for Arab Australians to "prove their loyalty" or "go home", and some Arab Australian Muslim women wearing hijab head coverings were reportedly harassed in public. The Australian government's Human Rights and Equal Opportunity Commission included accounts of racial harassment experienced by some Australian Arabs in their 1991 report on racism in Australia.

=== 21st century ===
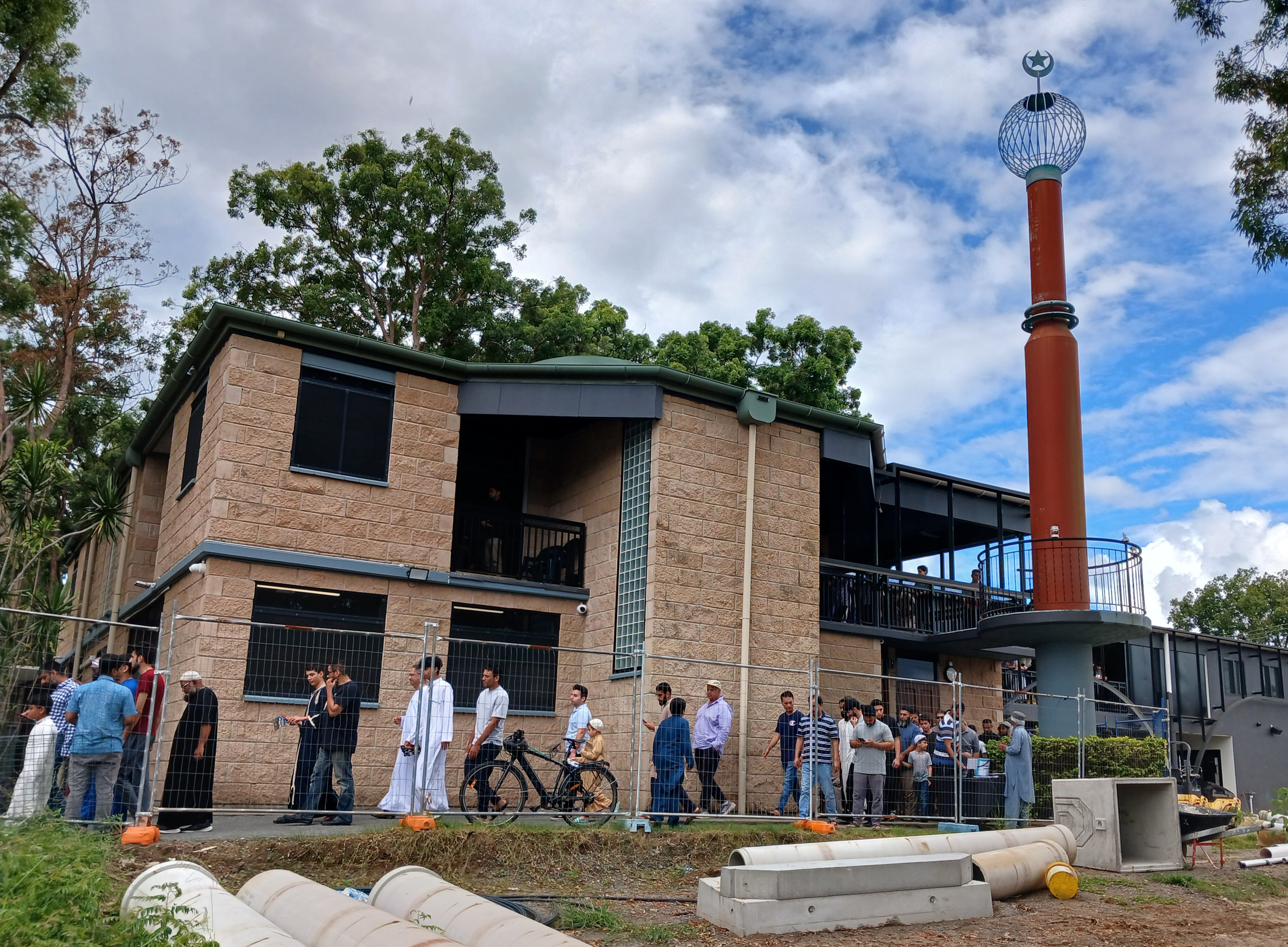
Kuraby Mosque Brisbane attracts large number of worshippers in Friday prayers.

By the beginning of the 21st-century, Muslims from more than sixty countries had settled in Australia. While a very large number of them come from Bosnia, Turkey, and Lebanon, there are Muslims from Indonesia, Malaysia, Iran, Albania, Sudan, Somalia, Egypt, the Palestinian territories, Iraq, Afghanistan, Pakistan and Bangladesh, among others. At the time of the 2011 census, 476,000 Australians (representing 2.2 percent of the population) reported Islam as their religion.

On a few occasions in the 2000s and 2010s, tensions have flared between Australian Muslims and the general population. The Sydney gang rapes formed a much-reported set of incidents in 2000; a group of Lebanese men sexually assaulted non-Muslim women. In 2005, tensions between Muslims and non-Muslims in the Cronulla area of Sydney led to violent rioting; the incident resulted in mass arrests and criminal prosecution. In 2012, Muslims protesting in central Sydney against Innocence of Muslims, an anti-Islam film trailer, resulted in rioting. There was an increase in anti-Muslim sentiment in the aftermath of the Sydney hostage crisis on 15–16 December 2014, including a threat made against a mosque in Sydney. However, the Muslim community also received support from the Australian public through a social media campaign.

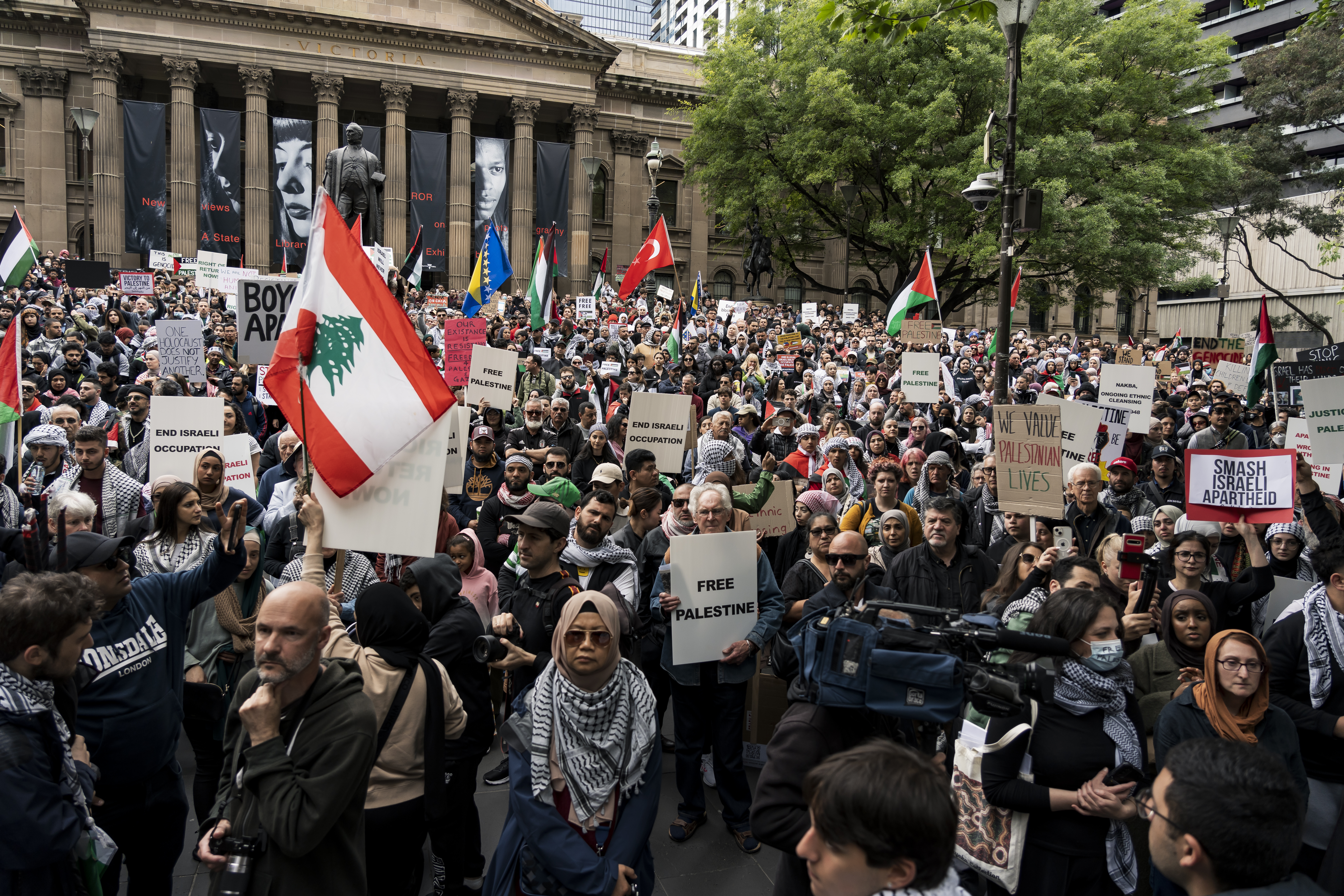
Pro-Palestinian protest in Melbourne, 15 October 2023

The founding president of the Australian Federation of Islamic Councils has said that with moderate Muslims being sidelined by those promoting more fundamentalist views, there is a need to be more careful in regard to potential Australian immigrants. Keysar Trad has said moderate Muslims need to take back control.

An article in The Australian in May 2015 opined, "Most Muslims want the peace and prosperity that comes from an Islam that coexists with modernity; it is a fanatical fringe that seeks to impose a fabricated medieval Islam". It describes Dr Jamal Rifi as a brave insider who is working to assist "the cause of good Muslims who are struggling for the soul of Islam".

== Islamic denominations ==
Most Australian Muslims are Sunni, with Shia, Sufi and Ahmadiyya as minorities.

=== Sunni ===
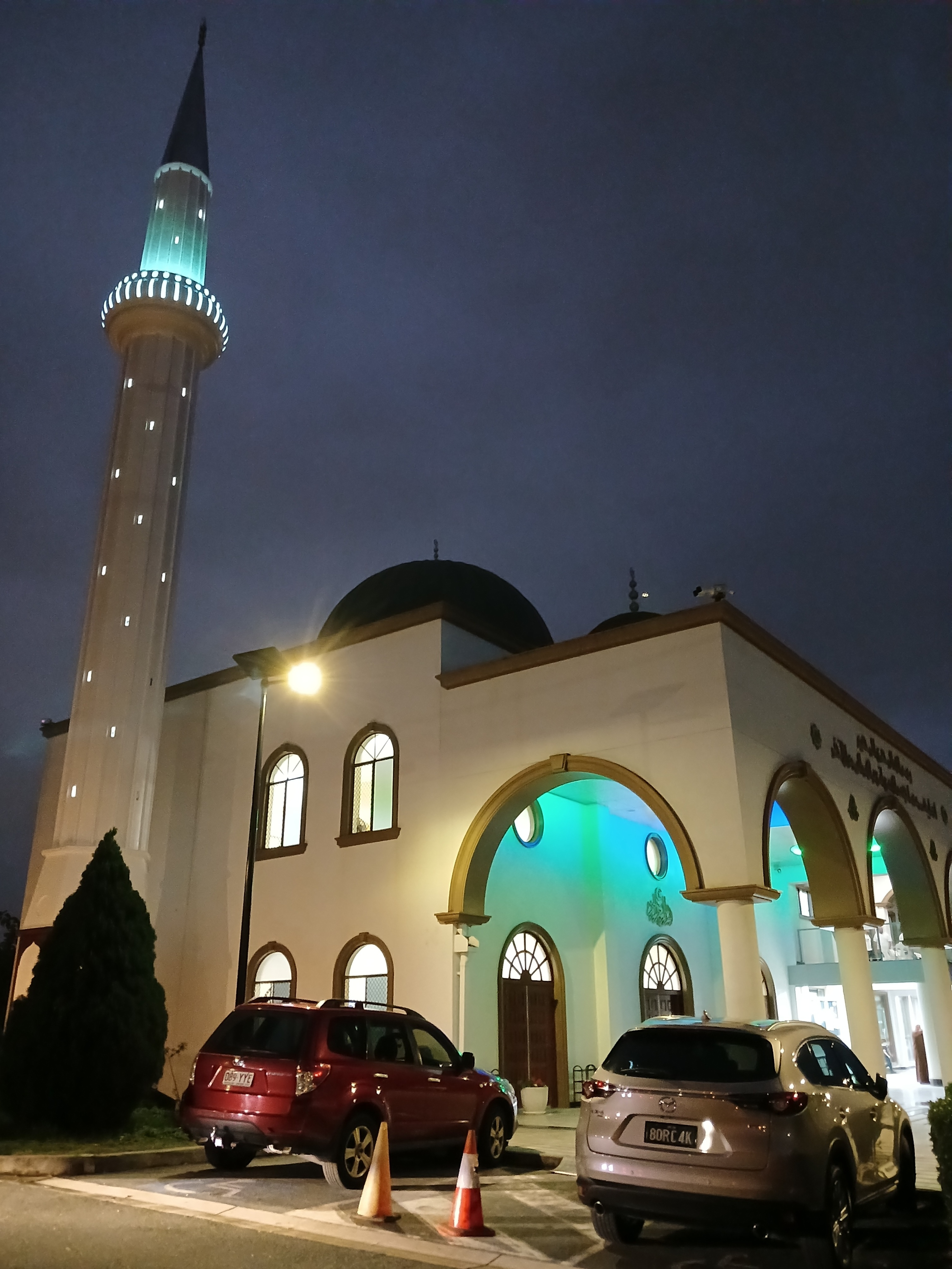
Rochedale Bosnian Mosque, Brisbane

In Sydney, adherents of the Sunni denomination of Islam are concentrated in the suburb of Lakemba and surrounding areas such as Punchbowl, Wiley Park, Bankstown and Auburn.

In Australia there are also groups associated with the "hardline" Salafi branch of Sunni Islam, including the Islamic Information and Services Network of Australasia and Ahlus Sunnah Wal Jamaah Association (Australia) (ASWJA). While their numbers are small, the ASWJA is said to "punch above its weight".

There are communities of NSW Muslims who adhere to Tablighi Jamaat form of Islam and worship at the Granville, Al Noor Masjid, which is led by Sheik Omar El-Banna. Similarly many Bangladeshi Tablighi Jamaat, Muslims worship at mosques in Seaton, NSW and in Huntingdale Victoria.

Dawateislami, which is a "non-political Islamic organisation based in Pakistan", has adherents in Australia.

In 2015, Wikileaks cables released information that Saudi Arabia closely monitors the situation of Islam and Arab community in Australia, whilst at the same time spending considerately to promote its fundamentalist version of Sunni Islam within the country.

=== Shia ===
In 1977 Sheikh Fahd Mehdi the first Shia cleric arrived in Australia and established the first Shia place of worship in Sydney, Al Zahra Mosque with funding from overseas and the help of Sayed Mohamed Kadhim Al Qazwini. He went on to establish the first Shia Islamic centre in Sydney AL-Jaafaria Society in Rockdale NSW.

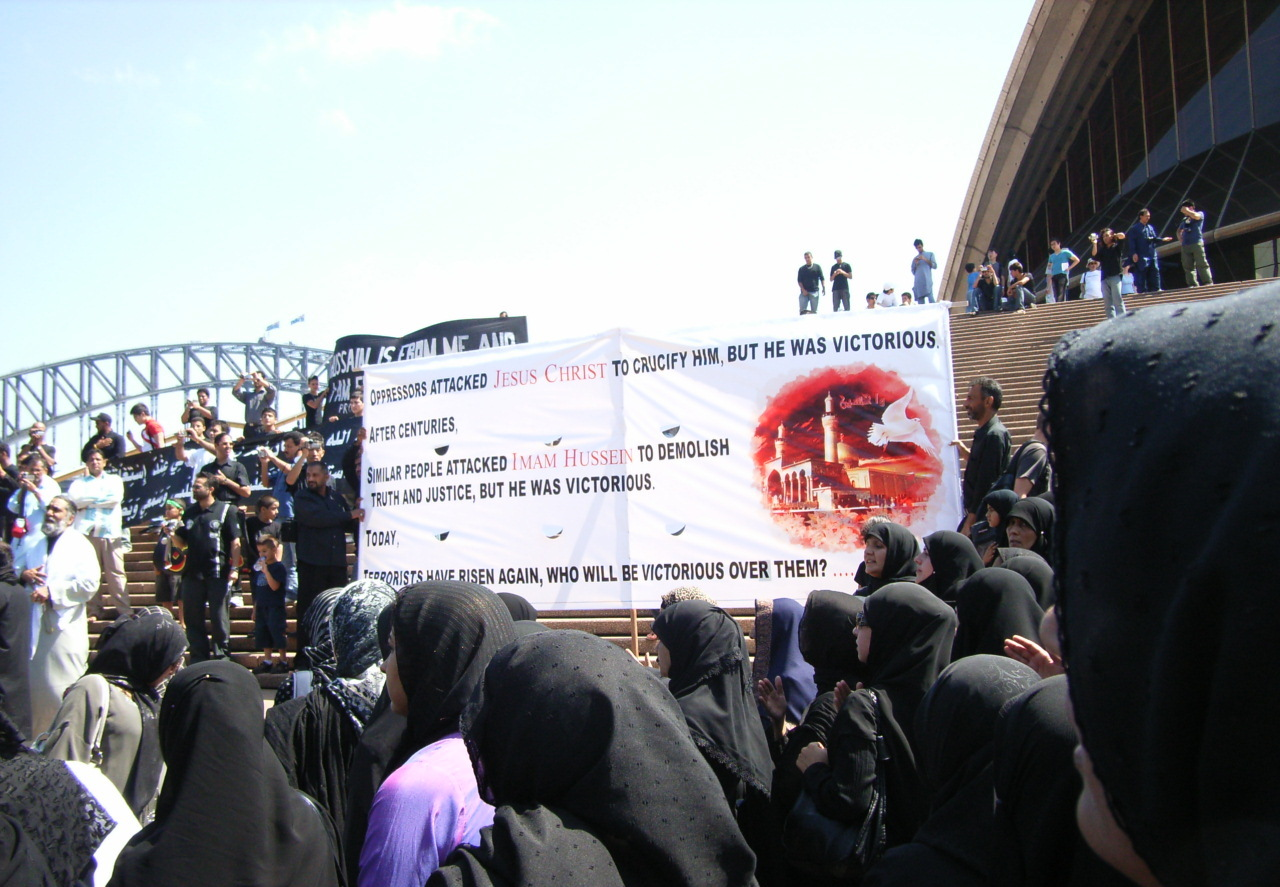
Shi'a commemorating Ashura outside the Opera House, Sydney.

The Shi'a denomination of Islam is centred in the St George, Campbelltown, Fairfield, Auburn and Liverpool regions of Sydney, with the al-Zahra Mosque, built in Arncliffe in 1983, and the Al-Rasool Al-A'dham Mosque serves the region in Bankstown. In 2008, the mainstream Shia community numbered 30,000 followers nationally.

In October 2004 Sheikh Mansour Leghaei established the Imam Hasan Centre in Annangrove, NSW.

In November 2014, up to 3,000 Shi'a Muslims marched in Sydney on the annual Ashura Procession to mark the death of the prophet's grandson. In November 2015 there was Ashura march in Sydney and a Victorian school observed Muharram.

=== Others ===
There are also others from smaller non-mainstream sects of Islam, including approximately 20,000 Alawites from Turkish, Syrian and Lebanese backgrounds. They have at least one school called Al Sadiq College, with campuses in the Sydney suburbs of Yagoona and Greenacre. There is also a population of the related, though distinct, Alevis.

There is also an Ismaili population of unspecified size. While Dawoodi Bohra, a small Ismaili Shia sect has its Sydney Jamaat located in Auburn NSW.

Additionally, the Druze, who practice Druzism, a religion that began as an offshoot of 11th-century Ismaili Islam, are reported to have around 20,000 followers living in Australia.

=== Sufi ===
The study of the history of Sufism in Australia is a fledgling discipline. Initial examination indicates that the Sufis have played an important part in Muslim engagement with Australia and its peoples. There are many reported instances of Sufism amongst the cameleers, though the best available evidence of this to date exists within a hand written manuscript at the historic Broken Hill mosque, providing at least one instance of Qadiri Sufis amongst the cameleers. Additionally, there is evidence the Qadiri Sufi network among the cameleers extended to Perth, where another hand written manuscript was discovered.

Baron Friedrich von Frankenberg, who was inspired by the man credited with first bringing Sufism to the West, Inayat Khan, moved to Australia from Germany with his family in 1927. The baron and his Australian wife were well-liked, and students would study Sufism under von Frankenberg at their home in Camden, New South Wales. In 1939 he organised the visit of a renowned Sufi leader, or Murshida, and devotee of Khan, known as Murshida Rabia Martin. Born Ada Ginsberg, the daughter of Russian Jewish immigrants to the US, Martin's visit was of great significance because of her link to Khan. After the baron's death in 1950, the poet and artist Francis Brabazon, student of Meher Baba, another early spiritual teacher took up a leadership role. However, there is some contention regarding the extent to which this group adhered to Islamic practice, limiting the extent to which this group can be considered a representation of Islam in Australia.

Currently there are communities representing most of the major Sufi Orders within Australia, including, but not limited to the Mevlevi, Rifaii, Naqshbandiyya, and Burhaniyya. Amongst these Sufi communities, it is estimated there are at least 5,000 adherents.

=== Sectarian tensions ===
Conflict between religious groups in the Middle East are reflecting as tensions within the Australian community and in the schools.

== Religious life ==
The Australian Muslim community has built a number of mosques and Islamic schools, and a number of imams and clerics act as the community's spiritual and religious leaders. In 1988, the Australian Federation of Islamic Councils (AFIC) appointed Sheikh Taj El-Din Hilaly as the first Grand Mufti of Australia and New Zealand. In 2007, Hilaly was succeeded by Fehmi Naji in June 2007 who was succeeded by the current Grand Mufti, Ibrahim Abu Mohamed in September 2011.

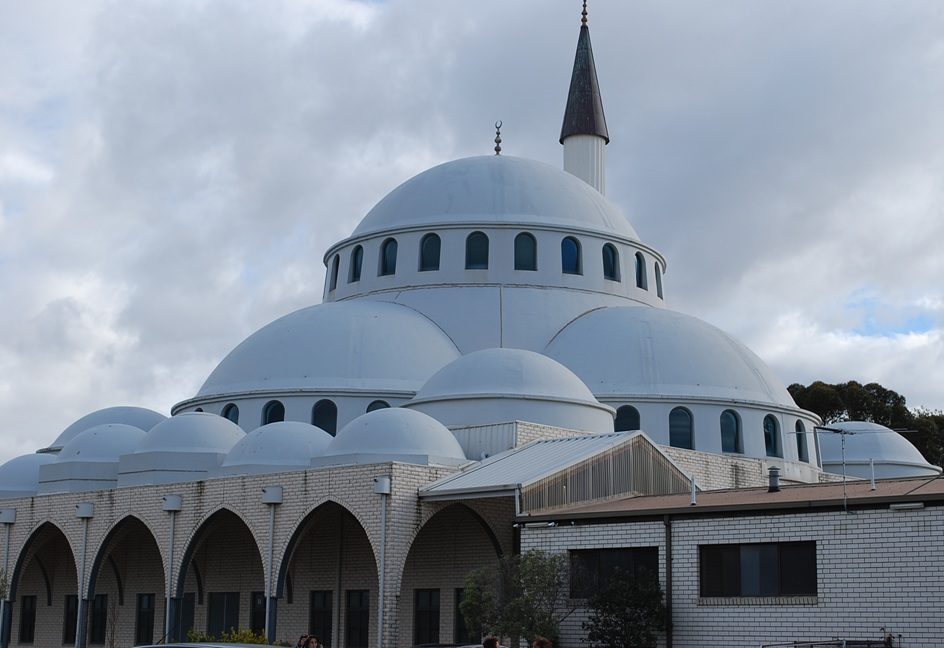
Sunshine Mosque located in Melbourne serves the Turkish Cypriot community.

Fatwas, edicts based on Islamic jurisprudence which aim to provide "guidance to Muslim Australians in the personal, individual and private spheres of life", are issued by various Australian Islamic authorities.

=== Organisations ===
A number of organisations and associations are run by the Australian Islamic community including mosques, private schools and charities and other community groups and associations. Broad community associations which represent large segments of the Australian Muslim public are usually termed "Islamic councils". Some organisations are focused on providing assistance and support for specific sectors within the community, such as women.

Two organisations with strong political emphasis are Hizb ut-Tahrir which describes itself as a, "political party whose ideology is Islam" and Ahlus Sunnah Wal Jamaah Association (ASWJA).

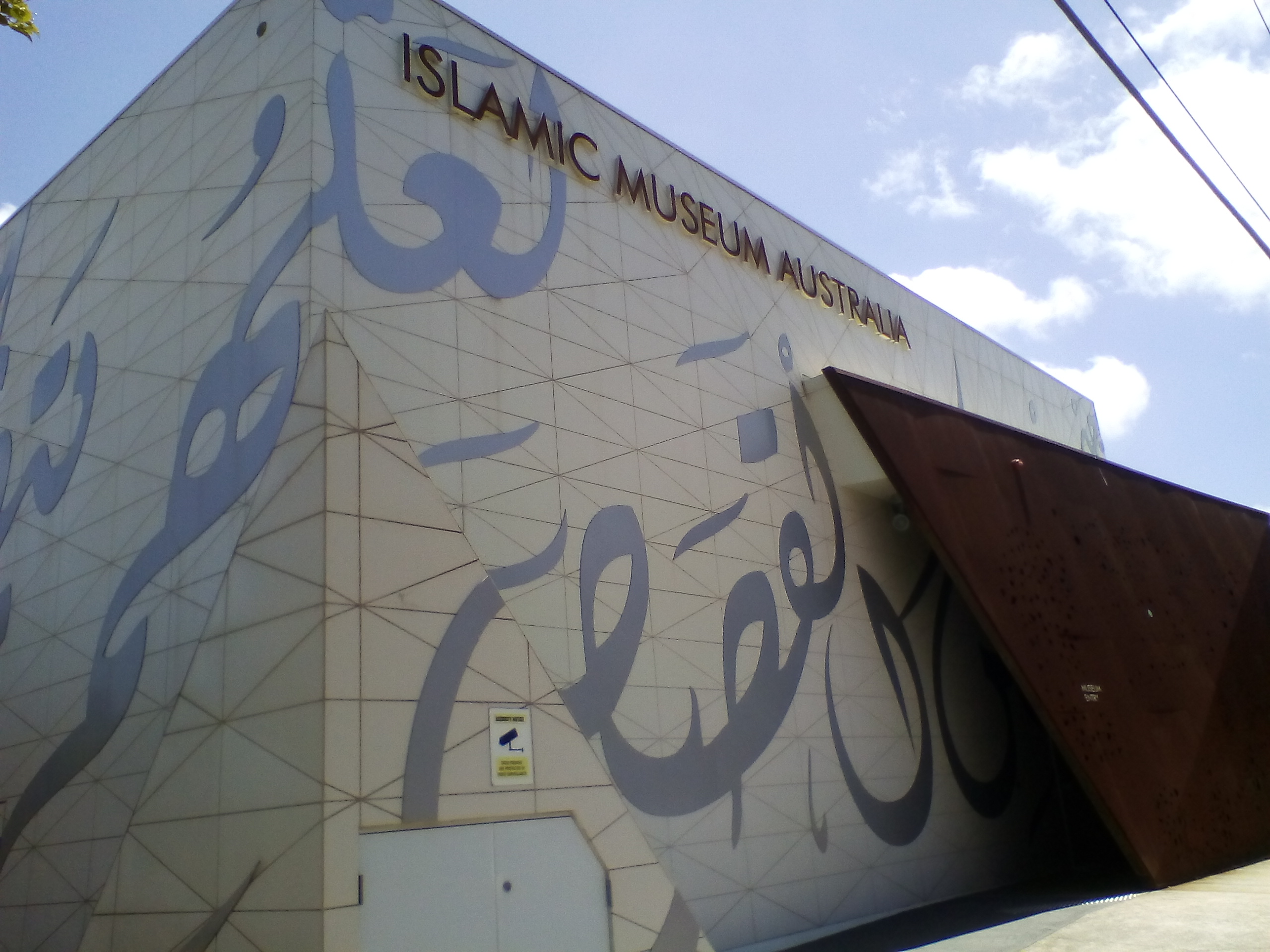
Islamic Museum of Australia in Melbourne

A number of financial institutions have developed Sharia-compliant finance products, with university courses leading to Islamic financial qualifications also being established. Other Australian Islamic organisations have been set up to manage sharia-compliant investments, superannuation, Islamic wills and zakat management.

=== Halal certification ===
There are close to two dozen Halal certification authorities in Australia. Halal meat and meat product exports to the Middle East and Southeast Asia have greatly increased from the 1970s onwards; this expansion was due in part to efforts of the AFIC. Halal certification has been criticised by anti-Halal campaigners who argue that the practice funds the growth of Islam, results in added costs, a requirement to officially certify intrinsically-halal foods and with consumers required to subsidise a particular religious belief.

An inquiry by an Australian Senate committee, which concluded in December 2015, found the current system is "lacklustre" and made recommendations for improvement. It found there was no evidence to support claims that the profits of halal certification are used to fund terrorism. The report recognised that halal certification has economic benefits for Australia because of increased export opportunities. It recommended that the federal government increase its oversight of halal certifiers to address fraudulent conduct, with halal products to be clearly labelled and for meat products sourced from animals subject to religious slaughter, to be specifically labelled. It said that it had heard, "credible reports suggesting that the lack of regulation has been unscrupulously exploited". In tabling the report, committee chairman Sam Dastyari said, "Some certifiers are nothing more than scammers." The committee recommended a single halal certification authority. The committee in recommending clearer labelling, specifically referred to the need for meat processors to label products sourced from animals subject to religious slaughter.

== Demography ==
=== Historical population ===
Historical population
Year	Pop.	±%
1981	76,792	—
1991	147,487	+92.1%
2001	281,578	+90.9%
2011	476,291	+69.2%
2021	813,392	+70.8%

During the 1980s the Australian Muslim population increased from 76,792 or 0.53% of the Australian population in 1981, to 109,523 or 0.70% in 1986. In the 2011 Census, the Muslim population was 479,300 or 2.25%, an increase of 438% on the 1981 number.

The general increase of the Muslim population in this decade was from 147,487 or 0.88% of the Australian population in 1991, to 200,885 or 1.12% in 1996.

In 2005 the overall Muslim population in Australia had grown from 281,600 or 1.50% of the general Australian population in 2001, to 340,400 or 1.71% in 2006. The growth of Muslim population at this time was recorded as 3.88% compared to 1.13% for the general Australian population. From 2011-2016, Muslim population grew by 27% from 476,291 to 604,200 with majority residing in New South Wales.

The following is a breakdown of the country of birth of Muslims in Australia from 2001:

There were 281,578 Muslims recorded in this survey; in the 2006 census the population had grown to 340,392. 48% of Australian-born Muslims claimed Lebanese or Turkish ancestry.

The distribution by state of the nation's Islamic followers has New South Wales with 50% of the total number of Muslims, followed by Victoria (33%), Western Australia (7%), Queensland (5%), South Australia (3%), ACT (1%) and both Northern Territory and Tasmania sharing 0.3%.

The majority of people who reported Islam as their religion in the 2006 Census were born overseas: 58% (198,400). Of all persons affiliating with Islam in 2006 almost 9% were born in Lebanon and 7% were born in Turkey.

=== Areas ===
At the 2011 census, people who were affiliated with Islam as a percentage of the total population in Australia divided geographically by statistical local area

At the 2011 census, people who were affiliated with Islam as a percentage of the total population in Sydney divided geographically by postal area

According to the 2016 census, the Muslim population numbered 604,235 individuals, of whom 42% live in Greater Sydney, 31% in Greater Melbourne, and 8% in Greater Perth. The states and territories with the highest proportion of Muslims are New South Wales (3.58%) and Victoria (3.32%), whereas those with the lowest are Queensland (0.95%) and Tasmania (0.49%).

At the 2021 Census, 258,250 people in Greater Melbourne reported their religious affiliation as Islam, representing 5.3% of the city's population.

Muslims in Melbourne live mostly in the outer northern suburbs of Broadmeadows, Coolaroo, and Thomastown (mostly Lebanese and Turkish), Meadow Heights and Dallas, the latter of which has one highest adherences to Islam in Australia, at 55% of the population) (mostly Turkish), Campbellfield, Epping, and Lalor (mostly Lebanese), Fawkner (mostly Lebanese and Pakistani), Wollert (mostly Indian), Roxburgh Park (mostly Turkish and Iraqi), and Craigieburn (mostly Indian and Iraqi). There is also a sizable Muslim community in the outer west, in the suburbs of Truganina and Tarneit (mostly Indian), as well as in the outer south-eastern suburbs of Dandenong (mostly Afghan and Albanian), Doveton, Hampton Park, Hallam, Narre Warren South, and Cranbourne North (mostly Afghan).

Very few Muslims live in rural areas with the exceptions of the sizeable Albanian and Turkish communities in Shepparton, which has Victoria's oldest mosque, and Malays in Katanning, Western Australia. A community of Iraqis have settled in Cobram on the Murray River in Victoria. An Albanian Muslim community resides in Mareeba who established Queensland's second oldest mosque.

Perth also has a Muslim community focussed in and around the suburb of Thornlie, where there is a mosque. Perth's Australian Islamic School has around 2,000 students on three campuses.

Mirrabooka and Beechboro contain predominantly Bosnian communities. The oldest mosque in Perth is the Perth Mosque on William Street in Northbridge. It has undergone many renovations although the original section still remains. Other mosques in Perth are located in Rivervale, Mirrabooka, Beechboro and Hepburn.

There are also communities of Muslims from Turkey, the Indian subcontinent (Pakistan, India and Bangladesh) and South-East Asia, in Sydney and Melbourne, the Turkish communities around Auburn, New South Wales and Meadow Heights and Roxburgh Park and the South Asian communities around Parramatta. Indonesian Muslims, are more widely distributed in Darwin.

=== Communities ===
Muslim population by country of origin
1. Australia (36.0%)
2. Lebanon (10.0%)
3. Turkey (8.00%)
4. Bosnia-Herzegovina (3.60%)
5. Afghanistan (3.50%)
6. Pakistan (3.20%)
7. Indonesia (2.90%)
8. Iraq (2.80%)
9. Bangladesh (2.70%)
10. Iran (2.30%)
11. Fiji (2.00%)
12. Other (23.0%)

It is estimated that Australian Muslims come from 63 different backgrounds, with "loose associations" between them.

==== Aboriginal Muslims ====
According to Australia's 2011 census, 1,140 people identify as Aboriginal Muslims, almost double the number of Aboriginal Muslims recorded in the 2001 census. Many are converts and some are descendants of Afghan cameleers or, as in the Arnhem Land people, have Makassan ancestry as a result of the historical Makassan contact with Australia.

In the North-East Arnhem Land, there is some Islamic influence on the songs, paintings, dances, prayers with certain hymns to Allah and funeral rituals like facing west during prayers, roughly the direction of Mecca, and ritual prostration reminiscent of the Muslim sujud. As a result of Malay indentured laborers, plenty of families in Northern Australia have names like Doolah, Hassan and Khan. Notable Aboriginal Muslims include the boxer Anthony Mundine and Rugby League footballer Aidan Sezer. Many indigenous converts are attracted to Islam because they see a compatibility between Aboriginal and Islamic beliefs, while others see it as a fresh start and an aid against common social ills afflicting indigenous Australians, such as alcohol and drug abuse.

Some academics who have studied these issues have come to less positive conclusions regarding the relationship between the Aboriginal people and the visiting trepangers.

==== Albanian Muslims ====
In the late twentieth century, 80% of Albanian speakers in Australia followed Islam. In the twenty first century, the largest Albanian communities in Australia, Shepparton and Melbourne's suburb of Dandenong in Victoria are mostly Muslims. Muslim Albanian communities exist in Western Australia, South Australia, Queensland, New South Wales and the Northern Territory.

As Islam is the dominant religion among Albanian Australians, it has given the community a sense of unity and the capacity and resources to construct their own mosques. They have symbolised the Albanian community's permanent settlement in Australia. Mosques serve as important centres for community activities and are pivotal toward retaining the religious identity of Albanian Australians. Albanian representatives serve in most federal Islamic organisations, with some in senior positions. In the few areas of concentrated Albanian settlement, their small numbers shaped local areas through the construction of their first mosques or becoming a sizable proportion of the school Muslim population. The foundations created by Albanian Australians have attracted future Muslim migrants to areas which have an existing mosque or services assisting with settlement.

Albanians perform certain Muslim practices. Muslim head coverings are worn mainly by a few older women, Ramadan fasts are adhered to by some people and in Shepparton, Islam is influenced by Sufi Bektashism from Albania.

==== Bangladeshi Muslims ====
According to the 2016 Australian Census, Bangladeshi origin population were around 55,000; among them about 33,000 were living in NSW. Bangladeshi Muslims are located primarily in Rockdale, Lakemba, Bankstown and many suburbs in Western Sydney region with a mosque in Sefton and in the south-east of Melbourne, with a mosque at Huntingdale. The Sefton Mosque has been linked to the Tablighi Jamaat School of Islam and has hosted Hizb ut-Tahrir. For Bangladeshi Muslims attending the Huntingdale Mosque, all Islamic lunar months, such as Ramadan are observed using local moon-sightings, rather than being based on Middle-Eastern, or other, timings. According to the 2016 Australian census, 81.2% of the Bangladesh-born population in Australia was Muslim by faith.

==== Bosnian Muslims ====
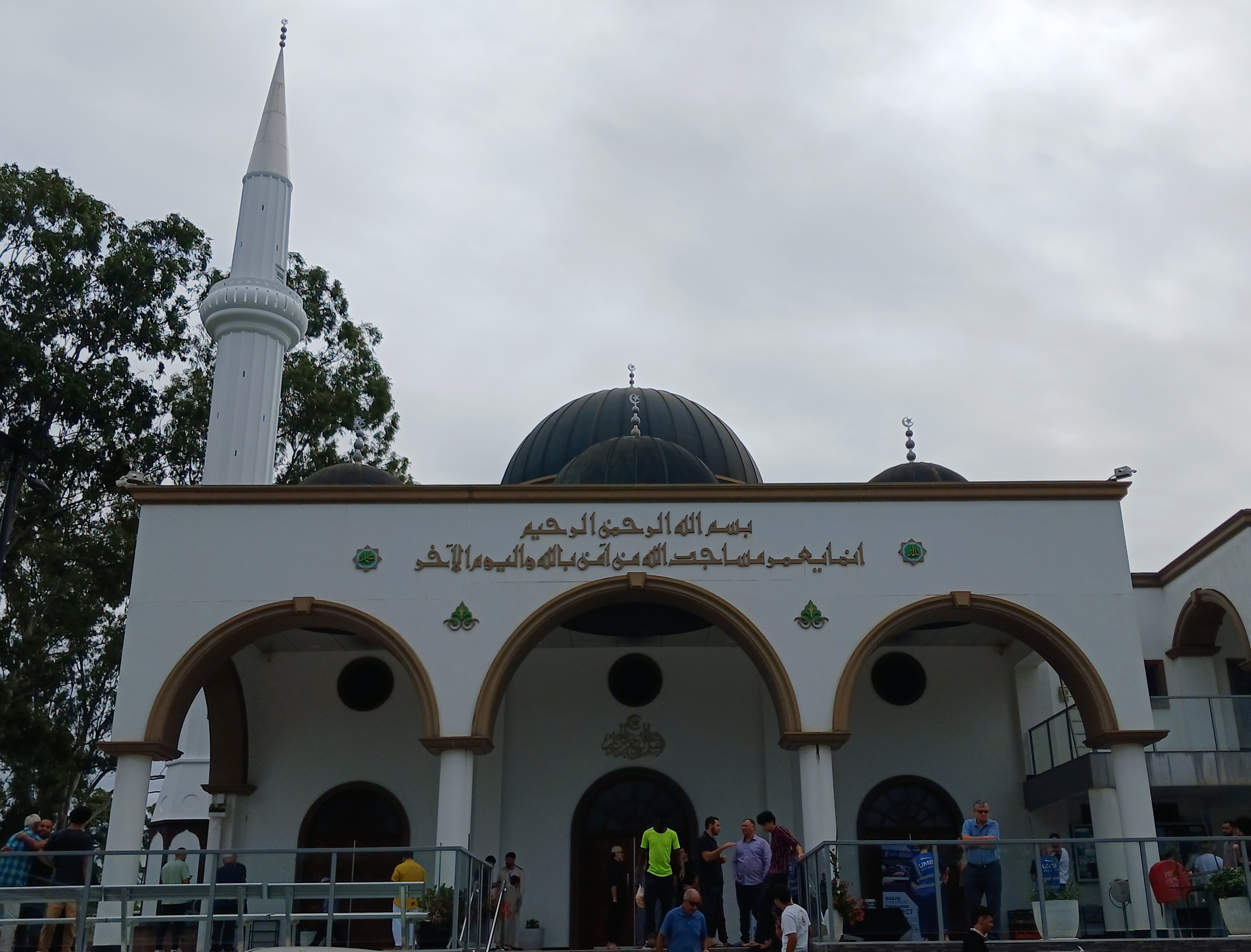
Rochedale Mosque in Brisbane Australia

Bosnian Muslims have predominantly arrived in Australia after 1992, with most of the community living in the south east of Melbourne and in the south west of Sydney. There are Bosnian run mosques in Deer Park, Noble Park, Penshurst and Smithfield. According to the 2016 Australian census, 23.2% of the Bosnia and Herzegovina-born population in Australia was Muslim by faith.

==== Egyptian Muslims ====
Egyptian Muslims in Sydney are represented by The Islamic Egyptian Society. The Society has managed the Arkana College in Kingsgrove since 1986. It is reported that enrolments for its 203 co-educational places are booked out until 2020. According to the 2016 Australian census, 15.6% of the Egypt-born population in Australia was Muslim by faith.

==== Indonesian Australians ====
Though Islam is the majority religion in Indonesia, Muslims are the minority among Indonesians in Australia. In the 2006 Australian Census, only 8,656 out of 50,975 Indonesians in Australia, or 17%, identified as Muslim. However, in the 2011 census, that figure rose to 12,241 or 19.4%, 18.9% in 2016, and 19.3% in 2021.

==== Iraqi Australians ====
Iraqi Muslims mainly came to the country as a refugees after the Iran–Iraq War, failed 1991 uprisings in Iraq, and then after the 2003 invasion of Iraq. They predominately settled in the western suburbs of Sydney, such as Fairfield and Auburn. According to the 2016 Australian census, 31.4% of the Iraqi-born population in Australia was Muslim by faith.

==== Kurdish Muslims ====
Kurdish Muslims have predominantly arrived in Australia since the second half of the 1980s, with most of the community settling in Melbourne and Sydney. Although the large majority of the Kurdish Australians are Muslims, there are no registered Kurdish run mosques in Australia.

==== Lebanese Muslims ====
Lebanese Muslims form the core of Australia's Muslim Arab population, particularly in Sydney where most Arabs in Australia live. Approximately 3.4% of Sydney's population are Muslim. Approximately 4.2% of residents in Greater Melbourne are Muslim, and Sydney Road in Brunswick and Coburg is sometimes called 'Little Lebanon'.

In November 2016, Immigration Minister, Peter Dutton said that it was a mistake of a previous administration to have brought out Lebanese Muslim immigrants. Foreign Minister, Julie Bishop said Dutton was making a specific point about those charged with terrorism offences. "He made it quite clear that he respects and appreciates the contribution that the Lebanese community make in Australia".

According to the 2016 Australian census, 43.5% of the Lebanon-born population in Australia was Muslim by faith.

==== Somali Muslims ====
Although the first Somali community in Victoria was established in 1988, most Somalis began to settle in the country in the early 1990s following the civil war in Somalia. Somalis are active in the wider Australian Muslim community, and have also contributed significantly to local business. According to the 2016 Australian census, 93.4% of the Somalia-born population in Australia was Muslim by faith.

==== Turkish Muslims ====
Turkish Muslims are a significant segment of the Australian Muslim community. Melbourne has the largest Turkish community in Australia, with the majority of Turkish Muslims living around Broadmeadows and other northern suburbs. The majority of Turkish Muslims in Sydney are from Auburn, Eastlakes and Prestons. Despite still having a large Turkish population in Auburn and Eastlakes, According to the 2016 Australian census, 64.0% of the Turkey-born population in Australia was Muslim by faith.

==== Malay Muslims ====
According to the 2016 Australian census, only 5.2% of the Malaysia-born population in Australia was Muslim by faith. This is because the majority of Malaysians who come to Australia are Malaysian Chinese.

== Issues ==
Concerns and contemporary issues facing the Australian Muslim community include rates of unemployment, the rights of women, concerns over Islamism and Islamic radicalism, among others.

Islamic preachers and clerics in Australia have been covered in the Australian press on account of the messages they have delivered publicly to the Muslim community or have otherwise shared with others in public settings. In some instances, various ideas and viewpoints espoused by these preachers have been subject of public or internal debate. Statements viewed as misogynistic and radically paternalistic have come under criticism.

Several foreign terrorist organisations have sponsored the establishment of cells in Australia, including Lashkar-e-Taiba, and Jemaah Islamiah. Al-Shabaab is believed to have been behind the Holsworthy Barracks terror plot. A man known as "Ahmed Y" established a small militant group in Australia in 2001 and advocated the idea of establishing an Islamic State in Australia. Groups led by Abdul Nacer Benbrika and Khaled Cheikho were active in Melbourne and Sydney, respectively, until police arrested their members in 2005. Instances of domestic terror inspired by radical political Islam include the plots by Faheem Khalid Lodhi, Abdul Nacer Benbrika and Joseph T. Thomas.

The Islamic State of Iraq and the Levant (ISIL), proscribed by the government as a terrorist organisation, has targeted Australian Muslims for recruitment. Making use of social media, recruiters target those vulnerable to radicalisation, and encourage local jihad activities. Some of those targeted have been minors, including a teenager who was arrested in Melbourne in May 2015 for plotting to detonate home-made bombs. In June 2014, the government claimed that roughly 150 Australians had been recruited to fight in the conflicts in Syria and Iraq. A list released in April 2015 showed that most were young males who have come from a range of occupations, including students. It was also reported at the time that 20 Australians had been killed fighting overseas for terror groups, with 249 suspected jihadists prevented from leaving Australia. The Border Force Counter-Terrorism Unit, tasked with stopping jihadists from leaving the country, had cancelled more than 100 passports by the end of March 2015. Several jihadists have expressed the desire to return to Australia, but Prime Minister Tony Abbott has said that any who do would be prosecuted on their arrival.

In December 2015 the Director General of ASIO Duncan Lewis stated that the number of Australians seeking to travel overseas to fight with groups such as ISIS had "plateaued a bit" due to better awareness of the issue among the Islamic community, few young Australians being attracted to ISIS and improvements to the speed with which passports could be cancelled. He also stated that a "tiny, tiny" proportion of Australian Muslims were influenced by ISIS. At this time the government believed there were around 110 Australians fighting with extremist groups, which was slightly lower than previous levels, and 44 Australians had been killed in Syria.

In an Australia-wide survey published in November 2015, which was based on 1,573 interviews, which asked, "What is the likelihood that Islamic State will carry out a large scale terrorist attack in Australia?" 24% of the respondents said "it is inevitable", 23% said "very likely" and 29% said "likely". Greens' voters were least concerned about an attack.

In May 2017, answering the questions during the Australian Senate-hearing, Duncan Lewis, the director-general of the Australian Security Intelligence Organisation, stated that there's de facto no connection between refugees and terrorism in Australia whilst adding: "But the context is very important. The reason they are terrorists is not because they are refugees but because of the violent, extremist interpretation of Sunni Islam that they have adopted."

=== Saudi influence ===
Saudi Arabia has been involved in the funding of Sunni-Salafi mosques, schools and charitable organisations, a university and Australian Islamic institutions, with estimates up to $120 million. This funding has generated tensions between Australian Muslim organisations. In 2015, it was uncovered by WikiLeaks, that the Saudi Government has provided finance to build Salafi mosques, to support Sunni Islamic community activities and to fund visits by Sunni clerics to "counter Shiite influence".

=== Promotion of antisemitism ===
The leader of Hizb ut-Tahrir has said that the Jews "are evil creatures", and the principal of Al-Taqwa College told students that ISIL is a scheme created by Israel. An Islamic bookstore in Lakemba was found to be selling a children's book that describes Jews as "much conceited" and intent on world domination.

Sheik Taj el-Din al-Hilali, former Grand Mufti of Australia said, "Jews try to control the world through sex, then sexual perversion, then the promotion of espionage, treason and economic hoarding" with Christians and Jews being, "the worst in God's creation". At a Victorian university, a Muslim group held workshops based on the teachings of Islamic scholars who have recommended the death penalty for homosexuals and apostates, promoted terrorism and preached hatred of Jews and Christians.

Dvir Abramovich, a Jewish community leader, said he was deeply troubled by Sheik Hassan's "divisive rhetoric".

=== Promotion of extremism ===
Material sold at some Sunni Islamic bookshops have raised concerns. For example, the Islamic Information Bookshop in Melbourne was stocking literature "calling for violence against non-Muslims"; the Al Risalah Bookshop was said to be "encouraging young Australians to fight in Syria"; and the Al-Furqan Bookshop was said to be polarising members with extreme views.

The Bukhari House Islamic Bookshop in Auburn, New South Wales, which is aligned to the Ahlus Sunnah Wal Jamaah Association has featured heavily in counter-terrorism raids. The gunman responsible for the 2015 Parramatta shooting is said to have spent his final days under the influence of Bukhari House leaders.

In Brisbane, the iQraa Bookstore was said to promote extremism. It was reported in 2015 that the al-Furqan and al-Risalah bookshops had both closed, but concern has been raised that this might be the "worst thing that could happen" as they provided a place for people to go to "express their frustrations".

=== Responses ===
A number of forums and meetings have been held about the problem of extremist groups or ideology within the Australian Islamic community. After the London bombings in 2005, Prime Minister John Howard established a Muslim Community Reference Group to assist governmental relations with the Muslim community.

Sydney's Muslim leaders, including Keysar Trad, have condemned the actions of suicide bombers and denounced ISIS. The Shia community in Australia have also expressed their concern regarding ISIS. In February 2015, Ameer Ali former president of the Australian Federation of Islamic Councils called on religious leaders to oppose Islamic State as, "I haven't heard so far any single imam in this country that has named IS and condemned it."

Glenn Mohammed a Muslim lawyer has written, "Muslims need to be able to discuss these issues openly and denounce barbaric behaviour. Instead, we choose to remain silent and then criticise a government that tries to make Australia safer." Psychiatrist Tanveer Ahmed has examined underlying causes and has identified the significance of issues relating to 'family' and to 'denial'. He has said, "Muslim youths have unique difficulties in coming to terms with their identity, especially when they have conflicting value systems at home compared with school or work".

In September 2014, the external affairs secretary of Australia's Ahmadiyya muslims, urged the Islamic community to denounce ISIS, "because they know very well that ISIS is responsible for brutal, reprehensible killings of Muslims in Syria and Iraq".

Peter Jennings, Executive Director of the Australian Strategic Policy Institute has said Australian Muslim leaders need to recognise that there are a "disturbing number of radicalised ideologues" who do not believe Islam is peaceful. He says, "some dramatic self-healing is needed".

In May 2015, the Abbott government committed a further AU$450 million to fight home-grown terrorism.

Muslim leaders have criticised the current Grand Mufti of Australia, following the Muftis response to the November 2015 Paris attacks. Ameer Ali has said, "The problem I have with the Mufti is he cannot communicate in English. That means he has to rely on the people around him." Anthony Albanese described the Grand Mufti's contribution as "completely unacceptable". Josh Frydenberg along with other senior politicians have urged moderate Islamic leaders to speak with one voice against extremism.

The founder of Australia's biggest Muslim media organisation Ahmed Kilani is seeking a "revolution" within the Islamic community and has called upon Muslim leaders to unequivocally repudiate violence conducted in the name of Islam. Dr Recep Dogan of Charles Sturt University's Centre for Islamic Sciences and Civilisation, said as Muslim leaders in Australia do not seem to be engaged at a community level.

During an interview on ABC Lateline program, the authors of a book entitled Islam and the Future of Tolerance, Sam Harris, an atheist and neuroscientist, and Maajid Nawaz, a former Hizb-ut-Tahrir member, argued that Islam has failed to modernise. Harris said, "We have a task ahead of us, a monumental task ahead of us, and that is to begin the process of adapting, reinterpreting our scriptures for the modern day and age." Politician Andrew Hastie has said, "Modern Islam needs to cohere with the Australian way of life, our values and institutions. In so far as it doesn't, it needs reform." Former federal Treasurer, Peter Costello has said, "Islamic scholars need to tell would-be jihadis, why these difficult sections of the Koran and the Hadiths," which may have been acceptable in the 7th century, "are not to be taken literally and not to be followed today".

Former Prime Minister, Tony Abbott has said, "there needs to be a concerted 'hearts and minds' campaign against the versions of Islam that make excuses for terrorists".

However, Hizb ut-Tahrir (Australia) spokesman, Uthman Badar, said, "Islam is not up for negotiation or reform. Islam is what it is." Hizb ut-Tahrir advocates capital punishment for apostates. Australia's Race Discrimination Commissioner, Tim Soutphommasane has said that Hizb ut-Tahrir's views are, "absurd."

In December 2015 the Grand Mufti of Australia and several high profile imams issued a new year's message supporting a fatwa against Islamic State. In the message they stated that "most Islamic Legal Circles and Fatwa Boards have condemned ISIS", and warned young people to avoid the organisation's propaganda.

In March 2017, the Prime Minister said that since September 2014 Australian security forces have disrupted 12 planned domestic attacks and charged 62 people with terrorist-related offences.

In December 2018, Australian authorities stripped a jihadist who had fought for ISIS and was held in Turkey on terror-related charges of his Australian citizenship. He had left Australia for Syria in 2013. The jihadist had both Australian and Fijian citizenship and according to Australian law, an individual holding dual citizenship can be stripped of citizenship if convicted or suspected of terror offences.

In December 2025, a Syrian Australian Muslim man received international recognition as the "Bondi Hero" for his actions during the Bondi Beach terrorist attack.

=== Discrimination ===
According to some scholars, a particular trend of anti-Muslim prejudice has developed in Australia since the late 1980s Since the 2001 World Trade Center attacks in New York, and the 2005 Bali bombings, Islam and its place in Australian society has been the subject of much public debate.

A report published in 2004 by the Human Rights and Equal Opportunity Commission pointed to many Muslim Australians who felt the Australian media was unfairly critical of, and often vilified their community due to generalisations of terrorism and the emphasis on crime. The use of ethnic or religious labels in news reports about crime was thought to stir up racial tensions.

After the White Australia immigration laws were replaced with multicultural policies the social disadvantage of Muslims was thought to have been alleviated. Some sources, however, note that Muslims now face some disadvantages on account of their religion. At times there has been opposition to the construction of new mosques in Australia. A 2014 report from the Islamic Sciences and Research Academy, University of Western Sydney, on mosques in New South Wales found that 44 percent of mosques in the state had "experienced resistance from the local community when the mosque was initially proposed". In around 20 percent of these cases opposition was from a small number of people.

According to Michael Humphrey, a professor of sociology at the University of Sydney, much of Islamic culture and organisation in Australia has been borne of the social marginalisation experiences of Muslim working class migrants. He states, "Islam in Australia is culturally and theologically plural by virtue of its diverse social and geographical origins which has brought together Muslims from very different cultural, sect, linguistic and national backgrounds".^{p. 35} He states that despite the rhetoric of equity, Australian "multiculturalism differentiates and values cultures differently according to undeclared criteria".^{p. 37} While the Australian migration policy assumes that migrants would succumb to the dominant individualising and secularising processes to leave their cultural identities behind, or confine them to private spheres at minimum; the host society treats Muslims as a force of "cultural resistance" toward the self perceived multicultural and secular nature of Australian culture.^{p. 36} This narrative results in the "negotiation of 'Muslimness' in the multicultural societies of the West [Australia]"^{p.35} Ultimately, "Muslim culture and identity [in Australia] is reduced, simplified and its diversity ignored".^{p. 35} Muslim practices of praying, fasting and veiling appear in the Australian western lens as challenging the conformity within public spaces and the values of gender equality in social relationships and individual rights. The immigrant Muslims are often required to "negotiate their Muslimness" in the course of their daily encounters with Australian society, the governmental and other social institutions and bureaucracies.

A poll of nearly 600 Muslim residents of Sydney released in November 2015 found that the respondents were three to five times more likely to have experienced racism than the general Australian population. However, approximately 97 per cent of the Muslim respondents reported that they had friendly relations with non-Muslims and felt welcome in Australia.

In an Australia-wide survey published in November 2015, which was based on 1,573 interviews, which asked, "Are Muslims that live in Australia doing enough to integrate into the Australian community, or should they be doing more?", only 20% of respondents thought Muslims are currently "doing enough".

A poll conducted by the University of South Australia's International Centre for Muslim and non-Muslim Understanding which was released in 2016 found that 10 per cent of Australians have hostile attitudes towards Muslims. The accompanying report concluded that "the great majority of Australians in all states and regions are comfortable to live alongside Australian Muslims".

A Council for the Prevention of Islamophobia Inc has been established. An Australian speaking tour by Ayaan Hirsi Ali, was proposed for April 2017. Because of her alleged Islamophobia, the Council for the Prevention of Islamophobia told organisers that there would be 5,000 protesters outside the Festival Hall in Melbourne if she was to speak at that venue. Her Australian tour was cancelled.

=== Women's rights ===
As part of the broader issue of women's rights and Islam, it has often been the focal point of criticism in Australia through comparisons to the situation of women in Islamic nations. Muslim women can face hurdles both from within the Muslim community and from the wider community. Following a successful appeal to the Victorian Civil and Administrative Tribunal by a Muslim lady, who believes it is a sin to be seen without a niqab, the policy of the Monash hospital is now for female doctors to attend to female patients, if requested. Several Melbourne councils have women-only sessions in their swimming pools. Monash Council has provided a curtain to ensure privacy for Muslim women.

It has been reported that a "growing number of Muslim men [have] multiple wives"; the same story cited Islamic Friendship Association of Australia president Keysar Trad as stating that there were "not many more than 50" polygamist Muslim families in Australia. Centrelink has been paying spousal benefits to Islamic families with several wives, with Centrelink saying that the payment of spousal benefits for multiple wives is done to save taxpayers' money, rather than paying single-parent-benefits for each wife.

The AFIC has advocated Australian Muslims being able to marry and divorce under the principles of Sharia law, saying that Australian Muslims should enjoy "legal pluralism". There are Sharia law based mediation centres in Sydney and Melbourne. To expedite a religious divorce, Australian Muslim women often agree to sharia law principles which result in an unequal distribution of assets and rights. A Melbourne based, Muslim lawyer has said, "his clients, almost all female, say they have been disadvantaged by Sharia settlements."

At a major Sydney mosque women are required to remain behind tinted glass on the second floor.

The leader of the Islamic Information and Services Network of Australasia, Samir Abu Hamza has told his followers that it is permissible to hit women as a, "last resort" but, "you are not allowed to bruise them . . . or to make them bleed". In response, he said that his message was taken out of context.

In March 2016 the New South Wales Civil and Administrative Tribunal determined that separate male and female seating arrangements at public events hosted by Hizb ut-Tahrir contravened section 33 of the NSW Anti-Discrimination Act. The Tribunal ordered that all future publicity materials for public events hosted by Hizb ut-Tahrir must clearly inform attendees that segregated seating arrangements are not compulsory.

In May 2016 the United Muslims of Australia held a conference in Sydney where genders were separated by a fence.

The president of the Australian National Imams Council, Sheikh Shady Alsuleiman has said that women would be "hung by their breasts in hell" and women should not look at men. He has also said that women must obey their husbands to enter paradise.

In February 2017 the promotional flyers for an Islamic Peace Conference, organised by the Islamic Research and Educational Academy, the three females had their faces replaced with black ink, while the faces of all other 12 male speakers were displayed.

In February 2017, in response to a question regarding the meaning of Quran Chapter 4, Surah 34, Keysar Trad president of the AFIC said a husband can beat his wife, but only as "a last resort". He later apologised for his statements conceding Islam does allow for this, but saying he was "clumsy" in the television interview, adding that he condemns all violence against women. In April 2017 Hizb ut-Tahrir (Australia) produced a video in which two women discussed how to resolve marital conflicts. One of the women said, "a man is permitted to hit a woman as an act of discipline" and described the permissive text as "beautiful" and "a blessing". The video was strongly repudiated by Muslim leaders, with the women subsequently saying, "more thought needs to be given to the question of purpose, worth and risk of sharing content online. We acknowledge our mistake in this respect in this instance".

=== Children's rights ===
It has been reported that female circumcision has been carried out in New South Wales, Victoria and Western Australia. The act has been a criminal offence since the 1990s. The first criminal trial concerning female circumcision in Australia ended with the conviction of three members of the Dawoodi Bohra Shia Muslim community in November 2015 and in 2016 a community leader was imprisoned. There are reportedly 120,000 migrant women living in Australia who have had their genitals mutilated.

A study, conducted by researchers from the Australian paediatric surveillance unit at Westmead Children's Hospital in Sydney, has determined at least 60 Australian girls, from the age of 6 months, have undergone female genital mutilation.

The school uniform at Sydney's Al-Faisal College "thought to have the strictest uniform policy for girls in the country" requires summer and winter, ankle-length dresses, long-sleeved shirts, plus head covering, for girls, while the boys can wear short-sleeved shirts - has been described as discriminatory.

There have been prosecutions under Australian law in regards to Islamic marriages involving underage girls. There have been allegations of failure by Australian authorities to respond to reports of child brides. However, the Australian Federal Police has stated that it is unable to follow up on the reports as they concern alleged child marriages which occurred before specific legislation outlawing the practice came into effect in March 2013, and the legislation was not retrospective.

At a Sydney school, Muslim boys were told not to shake the hands of females presenting awards at the school. The instruction is understood to derive from an Islamic hadith which says, "it is better to be stabbed in the head with an iron needle than to touch the hand of a woman who is not permissible to you". There are claims that another Sydney public school is, "run like a mosque" with the school refusing to adopt a program aimed at countering violent religious extremism. The principal of the school was removed.

=== Views on homosexuality ===
In line with the views of Judaism and Christianity, Islamic leaders in Australia generally believe that "the practice of homosexuality — is a forbidden action".

In June 2016, the president of the Australian National Imams Council (ANIC), Sheikh Shady Alsuleiman participated in an Iftar dinner at Kirribilli House hosted by the Prime Minister. The Prime Minister said he would not have been invited Alsuleiman had he known of his position regarding homosexuals. The sheikh had previously spoken about the "evil actions" of homosexuality. Australia's Grand Mufti, Ibrahim Abu Mohamed has defended Alsuleiman, saying Islam has a, "longstanding" position on homosexuality" which "no person can ever change". He said that any attempt to call out its teachings could lead to radicalisation. ANIC treasurer Imam Mohamed Imraan Husain said, "Islam prevents lesbianism and being gay." Uthman Badar spokesman for Hizb ut-Tahrir (Australia), said that Mr Turnbull was condemning the "normative Islamic position on homosexuality".

Yusuf Peer, president of the Council of Imams Queensland, in referring to the sharia law death penalty for homosexuality said, "that is what Islam teaches and that will never change." The Imam of Australia's largest mosque, located in Lakemba, NSW, Shaykh Yahya Safi has said, "In Islam we believe it's a major sin to have such relations between men and men, a sexual relation. We don't discuss this because it's obvious."

In August 2017, the National Imams Council issued a statement opposing the proposed introduction of same-sex marriage in Australia, and several individual religious leaders have also argued against same-sex marriage. However, some Australian Muslims support same-sex marriage, and the Muslims for Progressive Values and Muslims for Marriage Equality groups have campaigned in favour of such a reform. As of September 2017, there was no polling data on the Australian Islamic community's views on this issue.

=== Employment, education and crime ===
As of 2007, average wages of Muslims were much lower than those of the national average, with just 5% of Muslims earning over $1000 per week compared to the average of 11%. Unemployment rates amongst Muslims born overseas were higher than Muslims born in Australia. Muslims are over-represented in jails in New South Wales, at 9% to 10% of the prison population, compared to less than 3% within the NSW population.

=== Politics and civic engagement ===
Australian Muslim vote by general election Exit poll
Election year	Liberal/National Coalition	Labor	Green	Other
2001	<10%	75% to 85%	2% to 5%	<13%
2004	5% to 7%	80% to 85%	3% to 6%	2% to 12%
2007	10% to 15%	77% to 85%	5% to 8%	<1%
2010	15% to 20%	68% to 77%	8% to 12%	<1%
2013	20% to 25%	61% to 70%	10% to 14%	<1%
2016	12% to 17%	67% to 76%	12% to 16%	<1%
2019	22% to 27%	45% to 64%	14% to 18%	<1%
2022	15% to 20%	56% to 67%	18% to 24%	<1%
2025	<10%	35% to 45%	10% to 25%	20% to 55%

== In literature and film ==
There are a number of notable works in Australian literature that discuss the Muslims during the "Afghan period" (1860-1900).

- The Camel in Australia, by Tom L. McKnight
- Fear and Hatred, by Andrew Markus
- Afghans in Australia, by Michael Cigler
- Tin Mosques and Ghantowns, by Christine Stevens
- Ali Abdul v The King, by Hanifa Deen
- Australia's Muslim Cameleers: Pioneers of the inland, 1860s–1930s, by Dr Anna Kenny

Veiled Ambition is a documentary created by Rebel Films for the SBS independent network. A Lebanese-Australian woman named Frida, opens a shop selling fashionable clothing for Muslim women on Melbourne's Sydney Road. The documentary follows Frida as she develops her business in Melbourne also her journey in juggling a home in Sydney and a family life all while pregnant and expecting Veiled Ambition won the Palace Films Award for Short Film Promoting Human Rights at the 2006 Melbourne International Film Festival.

Ali's Wedding is an Australian film based on a true story of an Iraqi Shia immigrant family. It depicts some of the religious and social practices of the Shia community in Australia.

Slam is a 2018 Australian film about a Muslim Palestinian-Australian family's experience of Islamophobia in Australia.

== Notable Australian Muslim figures ==
- Randa Abdel-Fattah, novelist
- Aziza Abdel-Halim, female political activist
- Yassmin Abdel-Magied, mechanical engineer
- Fawad Ahmed, cricket player
- Ameer Ali, academic and political activist
- Mahomet Allum (c. 1858–1964), Adelaide herbalist and healer, former Afghan cameleer
- Shady Alsuleiman, senior Muslim cleric
- Waleed Aly, radio and television presenter, husband of Susan Carland
- Susan Carland, author and academic, wife of Waleed Aly
- Ed Husic, trade unionist, politician
- Anne Aly, academic, politician
- Sam Dastyari, former politician
- Jihad Dib, politician
- Mehreen Faruqi, politician
- Wassim Doureihi, spokesman for Hizb ut-Tahrir
- Ahmed Fahour, former CEO of Australia Post
- Mamdouh Habib, former Guantanamo Bay detainee, anti-war activist
- Abu Hamza, community activist
- Taj El-Din Hilaly, Sunni Imam and Mufti
- Bachar Houli, former Australian rules footballer
- Adem Yze, former Australian rules footballer
- Nazeem Hussain, comedian
- Rabiah Hutchinson, convert, wife of Mustafa Hamid
- Usman Khawaja, cricket player
- Mansour Leghaei, Shia sheikh
- Rashid Mahazi, soccer player
- Hazem El-Masri, rugby league player
- Ibrahim Abu Mohamed, Grand Mufti of Australia
- Feiz Mohammad, Muslim preacher
- Anthony Mundine, boxer and former professional rugby league footballer
- Fehmi Naji, Muslim Imam and Mufti
- Mohammed Omran, ASWJA Sheikh
- Aamer Rahman, comedian
- Jamal Rifi, General Practitioner and community leader
- Osamah Sami, actor
- Keysar Trad, community and political activist
- Mariam Veiszadeh, lawyer and community advocate
- Samina Yasmeen, academic
- Waqar Younis, former Pakistani fast bowler
- Irfan Yusuf, author
- Samier Dandan, president of Lebanese Muslim Association
- Jake Matthews (fighter), mixed martial artist currently competing in the Ultimate Fighting Championship's Welterweight division
- Belal Assaad, Islamic scholar
- Ahmed Saad (Australian footballer), Australian rules footballer
- Billy Dib, professional boxer
- Youssef Dib, professional boxer, brother of Billy Dib
- Yahya El Hindi, footballer
- Adam Saad, Australian rules footballer
- Tina Rahimi, first Australian Muslim women boxer to compete in the Olympics in the 2024 Summer Olympics

== See also ==
- Q Society of Australia
- Ahmadiyya in Australia
- Islam by country
- Islamic organisations in Australia
- Religion in Australia
- Shia–Sunni relations
