= Islamic Research and Educational Academy =

Islamic organization based in Hoppers Crossing, Victoria, Australia

- اکادمی برائے تعلیم و تحقیقَ اسلامی
- Formation: 22 November 2012; 13 years ago
- Type: Conservative Salafist
- Registration no.: ABN 71161351695
- Legal status: Registered with ACNC as a charity
- Headquarters: 1/29 Dunlop St, Hoppers Crossing, Victoria
- Coordinates: 37.868489°S 144.723442°E
- Leader: Waseem Razvi
- Key people: Syed Murtaza Hussain
- Website: http://www.ireaworld.org/

The Islamic Research and Educational Academy (IREA; اکادمی برائے تعلیم و تحقیقَ اسلامی) is an independent Islamic dawah organisation based in Hoppers Crossing, Victoria. It is Sunni-based and says, "We use religion to unite, where others may seek to use it to divide". It is led by Waseem Razvi.

== Waseem Razvi ==
The founding President of IREA, Waseem Razvi was born in 1981 and brought up in Saudi Arabia by parents of Indian origin. In 2004, he moved to Australia for higher studies. He obtained a master's degree in information systems from the Melbourne Institute of Technology in 2007. He quit from his job in 2010 to engage fully in Dawah works.

Razvi has been quoted as describing Australia, "As the largest multicultural country in the world, Australia accommodates people from around 200 nationalities. It is an open migrant country that embraces people of all cultures and religions with open hands and hearts" and that "Australian society gives followers of different faiths every opportunity to propagate their religion peacefully." "I am delivering sermons in certain churches in which I try to present the true picture of Islam as well as to remove misgivings, with a focus on major similarities and commonalities of Islam and Christianity.”

Razvi has met with Egyptian Sheikh Yusuf al-Qaradawi in Qatar, who has said he supports IREA's dawah.

Razvi has travelled to Saudi Arabia and Qatar to raise funds and to lecture. He said in Saudi Arabia that there is a group in Australia, Q Society, founded by Christian and Jewish zealots, with the slogan, 'Muslims should be kicked out of Australia.'

Razvi is a supporter of the late Islamic preacher, Ahmed Deedat, whose books have been banned from sale in France for being, "violently anti-Western, anti-Semitic and inciting to racial hate."

== The Australian Islamic Peace Conference ==
IREA runs Australian Islamic Peace Conferences (AIPC) which the ABC News has reported as a "controversial event".

Razvi has described the three main goals of the Australian Islamic Peace Conferences was to, "achieving unity among Muslims, build bridges of understanding between Muslims and Australian community, and open a door of communications for Muslims with the authorities. Organization of AIPC was a culmination of my endeavors to achieve these goals and it was a very successful one."

The advertised main speaker for the 2013 Peace Conference was Abdul Rahman Al-Sudais who, "has called for violent jihad" and is alleged to have made Antisemitic remarks. Prior to the conference Al-Sudais was denied a visa to enter Australia. Speaking at the 2013 conference was Abu Hamza who has been accused of telling men, "how to beat their wives".

For the 2013 Peace Conference, held at the Melbourne Showgrounds, Christians from various churches initially had approval to hire a stall to give away Bibles. The approval was subsequently withdrawn. The explanation given was, "because it would be unsafe".

One of IREA's conferences was banned by the Melbourne University because it required gender segregation of the audience.

At the 2015 conference, a young boy impersonated Islamic tele-evangelist Zakir Naik (Razvi's role model) who is banned in Britain and the conference keynote speaker Hussein Yee has implied that the Jews were behind the 2001 World Trade Centre attack.

The March 2017 conference is entitled, Quran The book that shook the world. Speakers include Shady Alsuleiman and Keysar Trad. In the promotional flyers, the three females have their faces replaced with black ink, while the faces of all other 12 male speakers are displayed. With organisers saying it was done to protect the women from being, "targeted in the streets." Subsequently, one of the female speakers, Monique Toohey pulled out after seeing her face blacked out, saying, "I didn't feel like it aligned with my values, and certainly not in a way that I choose to represent myself publicly".

== Council for the Prevention of Islamophobia ==
The Council for the Prevention of Islamophobia Inc is co-located with IREA. Razvi is the secretary of the organisation. Its purpose is to, "to protect and defend the Muslim community from discrimination based on their Islamic faith and/or race by multiple means".

An Australian speaking tour by the Dutch-American activist and author Ayaan Hirsi Ali, was proposed for April 2017. The Council for the Prevention of Islamophobia said there would be 5,000 protesters outside the Festival Hall in Melbourne if she was to speak at that venue, because, "she is an extremist who condones violence and radicalises people." Her Australian tour was cancelled.

== Controversy ==
The charity status of Islamic Research and Educational Academy has been revoked by Australian Charities and Not-for-profits Commission due to gross negligence in reporting. The charity registration is marked as "Double Defaulter" since 27 August 2019, and according to ASIC register, the charity is in External administration.

== Mosque proposals ==
Waseem Razvi and the IREA have been involved in proposals for mosques in the Melbourne suburbs of Craigieburn, Melton and the City of Casey.

== See also ==
- Criticism of Islam
- Gender segregation and Muslims
- Islam in Australia
- Islamic organisations in Australia
- Islamic schools and branches
- Islamic Research Foundation
