= Sunshine Mosque =

Mosque in Melbourne, Victoria, Australia

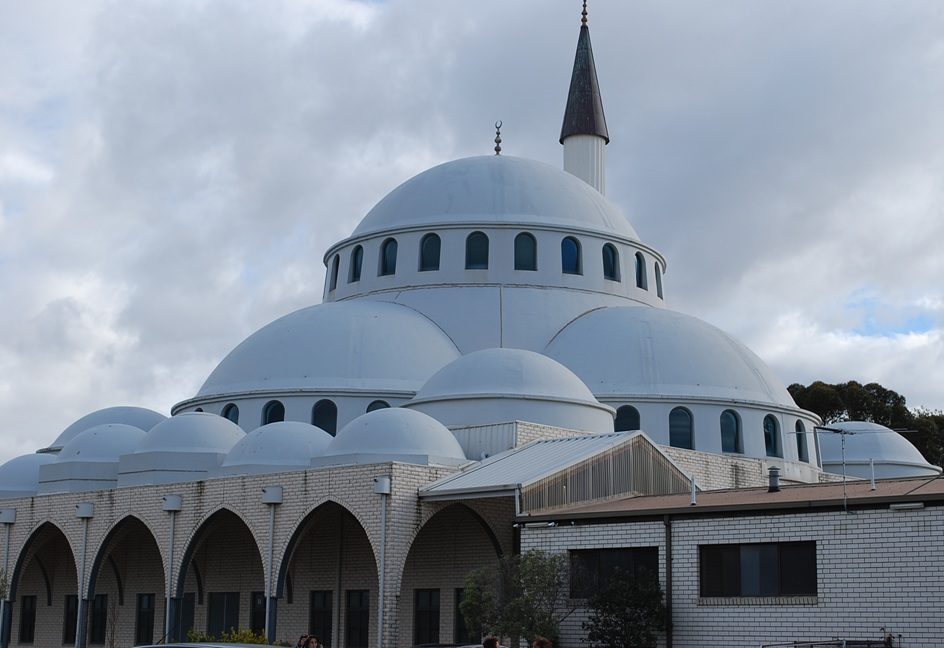

- Location in greater metropolitan Melbourne

Religion
- Affiliation: Islam
- Ecclesiastical or organisational status: Mosque
- Ownership: Cyprus Turkish Islamic Community of Victoria
- Status: Active

Location
- Location: Sunshine, (Melbourne), Victoria
- Country: Australia
- Coordinates: 37°46′19″S 144°48′04″E

Architecture
- Type: Mosque
- Style: Ottoman architecture
- Completed: 1992
- Construction cost: A$2,500,000

Specifications
- Dome: 17
- Minaret: 1

Website
- sunshinemosque.com.au

The Sunshine Mosque is an Ottoman/Turkish-style mosque located in Sunshine, a suburb of Melbourne, Victoria, Australia. The mosque contains 17 domes, a minaret, and a courtyard. The mosque is owned by the Cyprus Turkish Islamic Community of Victoria.

== History ==
In 1985, the Turkish Cypriot community in Melbourne saw the potential to build a mosque on a vacant block on Ballarat Road in Sunshine, Melbourne. Three members of the Cyprus Turkish Islamic Society offered their homes as guarantors to the Bank and became the owners of the lot for $191,000. Construction of the Turkish Cypriot Mosque began in 1992. The Mosque was designed to mirror the Sultan Ahmed Mosque in Istanbul, Turkey. According to a recent calculation by the committee of the Cyprus Turkish Islamic Society, the total expenditure of the Mosque exceeded $2,500,000.

== See also ==
- Islam in Australia
- List of mosques in Oceania
