= Deer Park Mosque =

Mosque in Melbourne, Australia

Deer Park Mosque Australian Bosnian Islamic Centre
- Location in greater metropolitan Melbourne

Religion
- Affiliation: Islam
- Ecclesiastical or organizational status: Mosque
- Ownership: Australian Islamic Society of Bosnia and Herzegovina Inc.
- Status: Active

Location
- Location: Deer Park (Melbourne), Victoria
- Country: Australia
- Interactive map of Deer Park Mosque; Australian Bosnian Islamic Centre
- Coordinates: 37°44′51″S 144°46′41″E

Architecture
- Completed: 1993

Specifications
- Capacity: 1,000
- Dome: 3
- Minaret: 1

Website
- www.abicdeerpark.com.au

The Deer Park Mosque is a mosque located in the Melbourne north-western suburb of Deer Park, in Victoria, Australia. The mosque is supervised by the Australian Islamic Society of Bosnia and Herzegovina Inc.

== History ==
The roots of the Deer Park Mosque date to the 1960s when the first Bosnian Muslims in Victoria gathered and established a multi-ethnic Islamic community in Carlton and Footscray. The Deer Park Mosque was built in 1993 as the religious focal point for the Bosnian community in Melbourne.

The Deer Park Mosque is one of the largest mosques in Australia.

== See also ==
- Islam in Australia
- List of mosques in Australia
