= Samier Dandan =

Samier Dandan is an Australian Muslim who is currently the president of the Lebanese Muslim Association. He is a well-known advocate of the Australian Muslim community.

In the lead-up to the 2011 NSW State Election, Samier Dandan famously threw his weight behind the Liberal Party in South-western Sydney, a traditional Labor stronghold. In the subsequent election results, the Labor Party suffered a 27% negative swing from the 2007 NSW State Election in the seat of Lakemba, representing the largest single swing in the entire state.

In 2012 he was ranked as the 9th most powerful person religious leader in Australia.

In July 2015, Dandan vocally condemned the Australian Government's announcement of $1 billion in deradicalisation funding and described the Government's counter-terrorism approach as a "mess".

Samier Dandan speaking at the 2014 Sydney Muslim Conference
