= Ameer Ali (academic) =

Australian academic

Ameer Ali is the former president of the Australian Federation of Islamic Councils, an umbrella group for various Islamic groups or councils in Australia. In 2006, he was the chairman of the Australian Muslim Community Reference Group, which was an advisory body to the federal government from mid-2005 to mid-2006.

Ali was educated at the University of Ceylon in Sri Lanka, the London School of Economics, and received a doctorate in economics from the University of Western Australia in 1980. He has taught economics at the University of Ceylon, Murdoch University, the University of Brunei and the University of Western Australia.

In 2005, Ali said that governments should, "rid the community of radical elements" and also prevent radical speakers coming to Australia. And further, the Muslim community needs to consider what is being taught to its young people.

In 2015, Ali called on religious leaders to oppose the Islamic State as, "I haven't heard so far any single imam in this country that has named IS and condemned it."

== Academic positions ==
1965 – 1967 Probationary Assistant Lecturer in Economics (University of Ceylon)
1967 – 1970 Research Scholar (London School of Economics)
1970 – 1975 Lecturer in Economics (University of Ceylon)
1976 – 1977 Senior Lecturer in Economics (University of Ceylon)
1977 – 1980 Ph.D Scholar at the University of Western Australia
1979 Part-time Tutor in Macroeconomics at Western Australian Institute of Technology
1980 Part-time Tutor in Macroeconomics at Churchlands C.A.E. Western Australia.
1980 – 1986 Lecturer in Economics at Murdoch University.
1981 – 1984 Part-time Lecturer in Middle East Economies at the University of Western Australia.
1986 – Aug 1994 Associate Professor in Economics, University of Brunei Darussalamt.
1995-July 1998 Tutor in Economics, UWA
1998- 2004 Lecturer in Economics at UWA.
2004 – Present Visiting Fellow/Lecturer at Murdoch Business School, Murdoch University.

== Semi-academic positions ==
1970 – 1975 Warden of Akbar-Nell Student Residence Hall at the University of Ceylon. This was an Administrative position where I was in charge of the Hall Finance, Discipline and general Administration. This Hall had a total of 500 students.
1976 Member of the University Admissions Committee appointed by the Ministry of Education in Sri Lanka. This committee was responsible for the number of students admitted to various University Campuses in Sri Lanka.
1965-67 & 1970-77 Chief Examiner in Economics for G.C.E. (Advanced Level) in Sri Lanka.
1978 Resident Tutor, Currie Hall, University of W.A.
1977 – 1984 Examiner for Tertiary Admissions Examination in Economics in Western Australia.
1985 Supervising Examiner for TEE Economics in W.A.
1990 – Present Associate editor, Journal of Muslim Minority Affairs
1998 Academic advisor to South Eastern University of Sri Lanka
1999-2002 Vice president of the Australian Federation of Islamic Council
2002-2006 President of the Australian Federation of Islamic Councils
2005- 2009 Vice-president, Regional Islamic Dawa Council of Southeast Asia and Pacific (RISEAP)
2006 Chairman, Prime Minister’s Muslim Community Reference Group. The Action Plan published by the government is the product of this group.
2006 Member, Coordinating Committee, World Muslim League Mecca, Saudi Arabia.

== Publications ==
Ali, A. (2016) From Islamophobia to Westophobia: The long road to radical Islamism. Journal of Asian Security and International Affairs, 3 (1). pp. 1–19.

Ali, A. (2015) Four Waves of Muslim-Phobia in Sri Lanka: c.1880–2009. Journal of Muslim Minority Affairs, 35 (4). pp. 486–502.

Ali, A. (2014) Muslims in Harmony and Conflict in Plural Sri Lanka: A Historical Summary from a Religio-economic and Political Perspective. Journal of Muslim Minority Affairs, 34 (3). pp. 227–242.

Ali, A. (2014) Political Buddhism, Islamic Orthodoxy and Open Economy: The Toxic Triad in Sinhalese-Muslim Relations in Sri Lanka. Journal of Asian and African Studies, 49 (3). pp. 298–314.

Ali, A. (2014) The Tamil-Muslim factor in interstate relations between India and Sri Lanka. FPRC Journal (2).

Ali, A. (2013) The End of the Road. South Asia Journal, 9 .

Ali, A. (2011) Sri Lanka and Chindia: Geo-political balancing acts before and after the civil war. Asian Profile, 39 (2). pp. 191–201.

Ali, A. (2011) The Sri Lankan ethnic morass and China-India geopolitical manoeuvres. Economic and Political Weekly, 46 (34). pp. 39–45.

Ali, A. (2010) Assimilation, Integration or Convivencia: The Dilemma of Diaspora Muslims from “Eurabia” to “Londonistan”, from “Lakembanon” to Sri Lanka. Journal of Muslim Minority Affairs, 30 (2). pp. 183–198.

Ali, A. (2009) Kattankudy in Eastern Sri Lanka: A Mullah-Merchant Urban Complex Caught between Islamist Factionalism and Ethno-Nationalisms. Journal of Muslim Minority Affairs, 29 (2). pp. 183–194.

Ali, A. (2008) Globalization, discontent and Islam: Thesis, antithesis and synthesis? Islam and the Modern Age, 38 (2). pp. 37–54.

Ali, A. (2007) Education to counter extremism. Directions in Education, 16 (19).

Ali, A. (2007) The closing of the Muslim mind. Journal of Muslim Minority Affairs, 27 (3). pp. 443–453.

Ali, A. (2007) The state, the mosque, and the masses: Discordant discourses in the Muslim world. Dialogue and Alliance, 21 (1).

Ali, A. (2006) Tabligh Jamaat and Hizbul Tahrir: Divergent paths to convergent goals: education to counter extremism. Dialogue & Alliance, 20 (2). pp. 51–66.

Ali, A. (2004) The Muslims of Sri Lanka: an ethnic minority trapped in a political quagmire. Inter-Asia Cultural Studies, 5 (3). pp. 372–383.

Ali, A. (2003) Government + LTTE – Muslims = Intifada: The cruel equation in Sri Lankan peace process. Polity, 1 (1). pp. 26–28.

Ali, A. (2000) Islamism: Emancipation, protest and identity. Journal of Muslim Minority Affairs, 20 (1). pp. 11–28.

Ali, A. (1999) The Schumpeterian Gap and Muslim economic thought. Journal of Interdisciplinary Economics, 10 (1). pp. 31–49.

Ali, A. (1997) Brunei Darussalem: An oily economy in search of an alternative path. Asian Profile, 25 (4). pp. 281–301.

Ali, A. (1997) The Muslim factor in Sri Lankan ethnic crisis. Journal of Muslim Minority Affairs, 17 (2). pp. 253–267.

Ali, A. (1995) Religiocultural Identity and Socioeconomic Development in the Muslim World. The American Journal of Islamic Social Sciences, 12 (3). pp. 329–346.

Ali, A. (1993) Voluntary investment in human capital and upliftment of Muslim minorities: An Indo-Sri Lankan focus. Journal of Objective Studies, 5 (2). pp. 1–17.

Ali, A. (1992) The quest for cultural identity and material advancement: parallels and contrasts in Muslim minority experience in secular India and Buddhist Sri Lanka. Institute of Muslim Minority Affairs Journal, 13 (1). pp. 33–58.

Ali, A. (1987) Muslims and capitalism in British Ceylon (Sri Lanka): the colonial image and community's behaviour. Institute of Muslim Minority Affairs Journal, 8 (2). pp. 311–344.

Ali, A. (1986) Politics of survival: past strategies and present predicament of the Muslim community in Sri Lanka. Institute of Muslim Minority Affairs Journal, 7 (1). pp. 147–170.

Ali, A. (1984) Islamic revivalism in harmony and conflict: The experience in Sri Lanka and Malaysia. Asian Survey, 24 (3). pp. 296–313.

Ali, A. (1984) Muslims and Sri Lanka's ethnic troubles. Muslim World League Journal, 11 . pp. 11–12.

Ali, A. (1984) Phases of capitalism in Malaysia: A profile of her political economy. Asian Thought and Society, 9 . pp. 26–27.

Ali, A. (1984) The genesis of the Muslim community in Ceylon (Sri Lanka): A historical summary. Asian Studies Association of Australia. Review, 19 . pp. 65–82.

Ali, A. (1981) The 1915 racial riots in Ceylon (Sri Lanka): A reappraisal of its causes. South Asia: Journal of South Asian Studies, 4 (2). pp. 1–20.

Ali, A. (1980) Thoughts on Islamic economics. The Muslim, XVI (4).

Ali, A. (1978) Rice and irrigation in 19th Century Sri Lanka. Ceylon Historical Journal, 25 (1-4). pp. 250–274.

Ali, A. (1974) Cinchona Cultivation in 19th Century Ceylon. Modern Ceylon Studies, 5 (3).

Ali, A. (1972) Changing conditions and persisting problems in the peasant sector of Ceylon under the British rule in the period 1833-1893. Ceylon Studies Seminar, 39 .

Ali, A. (1972) Peasant Coffee in Ceylon in 19th Century. Ceylon Journal of Historical and Social Studies, 2 (2).

Ali, A. (1972) The Peasantry and Coffee Culture (in Tamil). Cintanai, 5 .

=== Non-refereed articles ===
Ali, A. (1998) Review article: The Islamist challenge. Journal of Muslim Minority Affairs, 18 (1). pp. 190–192.

Ali, A. (1996) Book review: Islam and politics in contemporary Muslim world: A review essay. American Journal of Islamic Social Sciences, 12 (3).

Ali, A. (1993) Book review: Investment in Human Resource Development: An Escape Route for Trapped Minorities. Institute of Muslim Minority Affairs Journal, 14 (1-2).

Ali, A. (1991) Book review: Distorted Imagination: Lessons from the Rushdie Affair. Institute of Muslim Minority Affairs Journal, 12 (1).

Ali, A. (1989) Reflections on Islamic Economics and the Economic Concepts of Ibn Taimiyah. Institute of Muslim Minority Affairs Journal, 10 (1).

Ali, A. (1988) Book review: The Contemporary Muslim Movement in the Philippines. Institute of Muslim Minority Affairs Journal, 9 (1).

Ali, A. (1987) Book review: Pakistan Society: Islam, Ethnicity, and Leadership in South Asia. Institute of Muslim Minority Affairs Journal, 8 (2).

=== Conference papers ===
Ali, A. (2006) Improving the dialogue: A Muslim community perspective. In: Security in Government Conference, 9–11 May, Canberra, Australia

Ali, A. (2006) Interfaith dialogue: The Australian context. In: Peace and harmony conference, 1–3 September, Singapore

Ali, A. (2004) Islam and globalization: thesis, antithesis and synthesis. In: International Islamic Conference, Jakarta

Ali, A. (2004) Muslim Diaspora in the West: An Australian Perspective. In: Third International ASAA Conference, 8–10 July, Kerala, South India

Ali, A. (2004) Pedagogy for a plural society: A Muslim perspective. In: International Colloquium on Managing Muslim-Christian Relations, 11–13 February, Melbourne, Australia

Ali, A. (1994) Reconciling the quest for religio-cultural identity and socio-economic development. In: International Conference on Comprehensive Development of Muslim Countries from an Islamic Perspective, 1–3 August, Subang Jaya, Malaysia

Ali, A. (1993) Human capital formation and survival of Muslim minorities. In: Conference on Muslim Education, April, University of Peradeniya, Sri Lanka

Ali, A. (1992) Working women and their wealth related health problems in Brunei Darussalam. In: Industrialisation and Women’s Health: A regional Workshop for the ASEAN Countries, 22–25 April, Singapore

Ali, A. (1989) The quest for cultural identity and socio-economic advancement: Parallels and contrasts in minority experience in South Asia. In: Muslim Minority/Majority Relations Conference, 24–26 October, New York

Ali, A. (1979) Islam: An alternative approach to economic development. In: Papers and Proceedings of the Islamic Cultural Studies Conference, vol. 1, August, Brisbane, QLD, Australia

=== Conference items ===
Ali, A. (2011) Muslims in Sri Lanka after the Civil War. In: Public Lecture, 9 January, Colombo: Sri Lanka.

Ali, A. (2008) Islamic culture or Muslim cultures: Missing pieces in the Australian cultural kaleidoscope. In: Keynote address delivered at the Symposium on Islamic Culture, May, Adelaide, South Australia.

=== Book chapters ===
Ali, A. (2014) Riba–free finance and zakat–induced economic aid: The political economy of two developmental initiatives in the Muslim world. In: Clarke, Matther and Tittensor, David, (eds.) Islam and Development: Exploring the Invisible Aid Economy. Ashgate, Farnham, England, pp. 87–108.

Ali, A. (2014) The political economy of Islamic banking and finance3: A faith-based enterprise growing in the global village. In: vanden Driesen, C. and Kumar, T.V., (eds.) Globalisation: Australian-Asian perspectives. Atlantic Publishers & Distributors, New Delhi, India, pp. 18–35.

Ali, A. (2013) Sri Lankan Muslim diaspora. In: Reeves, P., (ed.) The Encyclopedia of the Sri Lankan Diaspora. Editions Didier Millet, Singapore, pp. 54–58.

Ali, A. (2012) The politics of Sri Lanka-Tamil Nadu relations. In: Indian Ocean: A Sea of Uncertainty. Future Directions International, West Perth, Western Australia, pp. 77–79.

Ali, A. (2011) Kattankudy in eastern Sri Lanka: A mullah-merchant urban complex caught between Islamist factionalism and ethno-nationalism. In: vanden Driesen, C. and vanden Driesen, I., (eds.) Change: Conflict and Convergence : Austral Asian Scenarios. Orient Blackswan, New Delhi, India, pp. 232–244.

Ali, A. (2005) The Muslim diaspora in the west: The challenges from an Australian perspective. In: vanden Driesen, C. and Crane, R., (eds.) Diaspora : the Australasian experience. Prestige Books, New Delhi, India, pp. 119–130.

Ali, A. (2002) Globalization and greed: A Muslim perspective. In: Knitter, Paul F. and Muzaffar, Chandra, (eds.) Subverting greed: Religious perspectives on the global economy. Orbis Books, Maryknoll, N.Y., pp. 137–153.

Ali, A. (1993) Industrialisation or industries? The vision and the viability in Brunei Darussalam. In: Sumbangsih, Sultan’s Silver Jubilee Publication. University of Brunei Darussalam, Gadong, Bruni, pp. 196–205.

Ali, A. (1985) Muslims and the export sector of Sri Lanka. In: Muslims of Sri Lanka. ., Colombo.

=== Books ===
Ali, A. (ed) (2011) Revolutionary Thoughts, Essays and Poem from Abdul Cader Labbe (in Tamil). Colombo: Sri Lanka.

Ali, A. (2001) Plural identities and political choices of the Muslim community. A history of ethnic conflict in Sri Lanka: Recollection, reinterpretation & reconciliation. Marga Institute, Colombo, Sri Lanka.

Ali, A. (1996) From penury to plenty : development of oil rich Brunei, 1906 to present. Murdoch University.

Others

Ali, A. (1976) Some aspects of the Economic History and Position of the Muslims in Sri Lanka. Sri Lanka Muslim Development Fund Souvenir .

=== Newspaper articles (English) ===
A Populist Budget Risking Higher Debt, 20 November 2020 https://www.colombotelegraph.com/index.php/a-populist-budget-risking-higher-debt/

Politics Behind Muslim Burial, 13 November 2020 http://www.ft.lk/columns/Politics-behind-Muslim-burial/4-708846

Cabraal’s Bravado & GR’s Thought Bubbles, Colombo Telegraph | 8 October 2020 https://www.colombotelegraph.com/index.php/cabraals-bravado-grs-thought-bubbles/

=== Newspaper articles (Tamil) ===
முஸ்லிம் ஜனாஸாக்களை எரிப்பதன் பின்னாலுள்ள அரசியல் போக்கு http://www.jaffnamuslim.com/2020/11/blog-post_468.html

தேவை ஒரு புதுப்பாதை – கலாநிதி அமீரலி, 23 Nov 2020 https://thinakkural.lk/article/91769#.X7p4w6Ht7jE.whatsapp

இலங்கையின் இனப்பிரச்சினையும் சர்வதேச அரங்கும், 15 Oct 2020 https://thinakkural.lk/article/79890

13ஆம் திருத்தமும் தமிழரின் பரிதாப நிலையும் – கலாநிதி அமீரலி, October 7, 2020 https://thinakkural.lk/article/77539

யாப்புத் திருத்தங்களும் குடும்ப ஆட்சியும் – கலாநிதி அமீரலி, 07 Oct 2020 https://thinakkural.lk/article/71389

அரசியல் சதுரங்க விளையாட்டில் பகடைக் காயாகும் பசு, Oct 6, 2020 http://www.vidivelli.lk/article/9859

காவியுடைக் காடையர்களும் ஆட்சியின் காவலர்களா? – கலாநிதி அமீரலி, September 30, 2020 https://thinakkural.lk/article/74537

வைசியமும் வைதீகமும் வளர்த்த முஸ்லிம் அரசியல், 9 Aug 2020 http://www.vidivelli.lk/article/9722

மதரசாக் கல்வியில் மாற்றம் வேண்டும், 9 Aug 2020 http://www.vidivelli.lk/article/9740

முஸ்லிம்களும் மூன்றிலிரண்டு பெரும்பான்மையும், 20 Jan 2020 http://www.vidivelli.lk/article/8804

ஆளுநர்கள், அமைச்சர்களின் பதவி விலகல்கள் பிக்குமாரும் சட்டமும், 10 Jan 2020 http://www.vidivelli.lk/article/5668

மூதறிஞர், கல்விமான் மற்றும் தேசாபிமானியாகத் திகழ்ந்த ஏ.எம்.ஏ. அஸீஸ், 27 Nov 2018 http://www.vidivelli.lk/article/605

== See also ==
- Islam in Australia
- Islamic organisations in Australia
