= Jamal Rifi =

Australian physician (born 1959)

Jamal Rifi (born 16 June 1959) is a Lebanese-born Australian general practitioner in Sydney. He is known for his ardent support of the Australian Labor Party candidate, Tony Burke, during the 2025 Australian Federal Election.

== Biography ==
Born in Lebanon, Rifi moved to Australia at the age of 24 to study medicine. Rifi has been acknowledged for his work in trying to prevent the radicalisation of young Muslims in Sydney and has been praised for his community work; however, he has also been criticised and received death threats, including from terrorist Mohamed Elomar, who once tweeted that he would give money to people who helped intimidate Rifi, whom he described as a "Habashi dog", and his family.

He has strongly criticised the content some of the material sold in Islamic bookshops, saying that it is better to discuss these issues rather than banning books.

In 2010, he was a national finalist as Australia's Local Hero for the Australian of the Year. Subsequently in January 2015 he was chosen by The Australian newspaper as its alternate Australian of the Year. When he was announced as the winner, he was praised by senior politician Scott Morrison who said that Rifi is a "great Australian".

In October 2015, Rifi was awarded an honorary doctorate by the University of Canberra.

In 2017, Rifi was awarded a Medal of the Order of Australia.

In 2021, Rifi was sentenced in absentia to 10 years imprisonment by the Lebanese military tribunal for "collaborating with Israel" through his work with Project Rozana, which helps provide medical training for Palestinian medical workers and helps organise the transfer of Palestinian patients to hospitals in Israel. Rifi blamed this on the "corrupt" Lebanese government, and more specifically, Hezbollah.

He is the brother of Lebanese politician Ashraf Rifi.

== See also ==
- Islam in Australia
