= Shady Alsuleiman =

Australian imam and Muslim leader

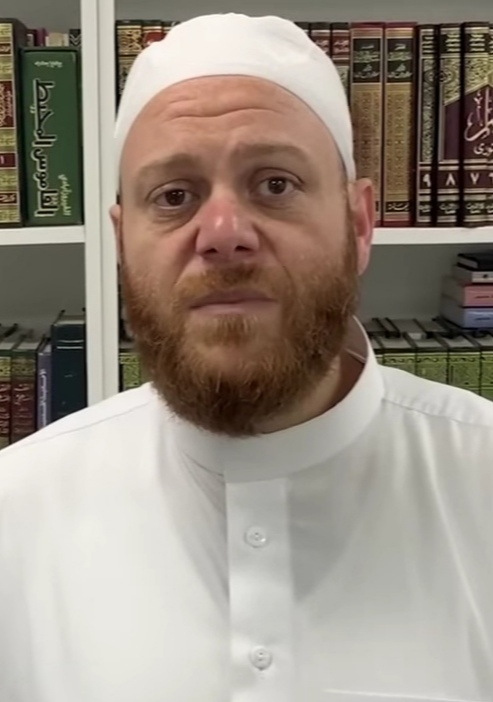
- Title: Imam

Personal life
- Born: 1978 (age 47–48) Sydney, Australia
- Known for: President of the Australian National Imams Council and founder of the United Muslims of Australia
- Occupation: Imam, religious leader
- Honors: Included in The 500 Most Influential Muslims

Religious life
- Religion: Islam
- Denomination: Sunni
- Founder of: United Muslims of Australia (UMA); Sydney Islamic College

Muslim leader
- Based in: Sydney, Australia
- Present post: President of the Australian National Imams Council (2016–present) President of the United Muslims of Australia
- Previous post: Secretary of the Australian National Imams Council (2006–2015)

Shady Alsuleiman (born 1978 in Sydney, Australia) is a Muslim imam and the president of the Australian National Imams Council and the United Muslims of Australia. He is from a Palestinian family who migrated to Australia in the late 1960s. He initially obtained an Ijazah (licence) with Sanad (complete chain back to Muhammad) in complete and sound memorization of the Quran at Darul Uloom Al-Husainiah in Sindh, Pakistan.

Alsuleiman has been recognized as one of the 500 most influential Muslims in the world.

== Background ==
Alsuleiman is the founder of one of Australia's largest youth centres known as the UMA in Sydney, as well as Sydney Islamic College, which delivers Islamic studies to adults. He also held the position of the secretary of the Australian National Imams Council (ANIC) from 2006 to 2015. He was re-elected as the president in 2019.

Alsuleiman has been described as "controversial" by Fairfax newspaper WAtoday. However, he has also been described as "moderate" by the Sydney Morning Herald, another Fairfax newspaper. He has been verbally attacked by British extremist Abu Haleema for some of his fatwas.

Alsuleiman established the organisation, United Muslims of Australia and in 2016 was elected as the president of Australian National Imams Council (ANIC).

In April 2018, Alsuleiman was banned from entering the Kingdom of Denmark to stop him from spreading his views there. He was the 14th addition to a list of foreign religious preachers which are barred from entering by the Ministry of Immigration and Integration.

== Views ==
In 2013, Alsuleiman spoke of what he called the "evil of homosexuality", making broad statements regarding HIV and AIDS.

Alsuleiman filed defamation charges against Newscorp in 2017 regarding claims he preached homophobia and hatred towards women and minorities. In 2018, it was reported that Alsuleiman had won the case; Newscorp were ordered to pay costs and remove the articles which made the defamatory claims.

Alsuleiman has signed a Muslim community letter condemning “all forms of intimidation and abuse targeting women”. He has been featured in online videos both supporting sharia law and respecting women.

== Controversies ==
In February 2009, a Fairfax journalist was ejected from the Lakemba Mosque during an event, during which, Fairfax later reported that Anwar al-Awlaki spoke via phone link. The director of the mosque told Fairfax journalists that Alsuleiman was in charge of organising evening youth events at the time of the sermon.

In 2014 Alsuleiman spoke at Park View Academy, a Birmingham UK secondary school claimed to be at the centre of Operation Trojan Horse. Alsuleiman told the pupils, "Give victory to Muslims in Afghanistan… Give victory to all the Mujahideen all over the world. Oh Allah, prepare us for the jihad". A subsequent Department for Education, Education Funding Agency (EFA) report said that there was a breach of standards at the school which had allowed, "Sheikh Shady Al-Suleiman, known to extol extremist views (e.g. stoning of adulterers), to address the students". A newspaper report said Asuleiman had only talked about "time management".

In June 2016, Alsuleiman participated in an Iftar dinner at Kirribilli House hosted by the Prime Minister. The Prime Minister said he would not have invited Alsuleiman had he known of his position regarding homosexuals. Alsuleiman said he did not hold radical anti-gay views. Australia's Grand Mufti, Ibrahim Abu Mohamed has repudiated Malcolm Turnbull's position on this issue, saying Islam has a, "longstanding" position on homosexuality" which "no person can ever change". He said that any attempt to call out its teachings could lead to radicalisation.

== See also ==
- Australian National Imams Council
- Homosexuality in Islam
- Islam in Australia
- Islamic organisations in Australia
- Marriage in Islam
- Women in Islam
