= Mansour Leghaei =

Iranian cleric

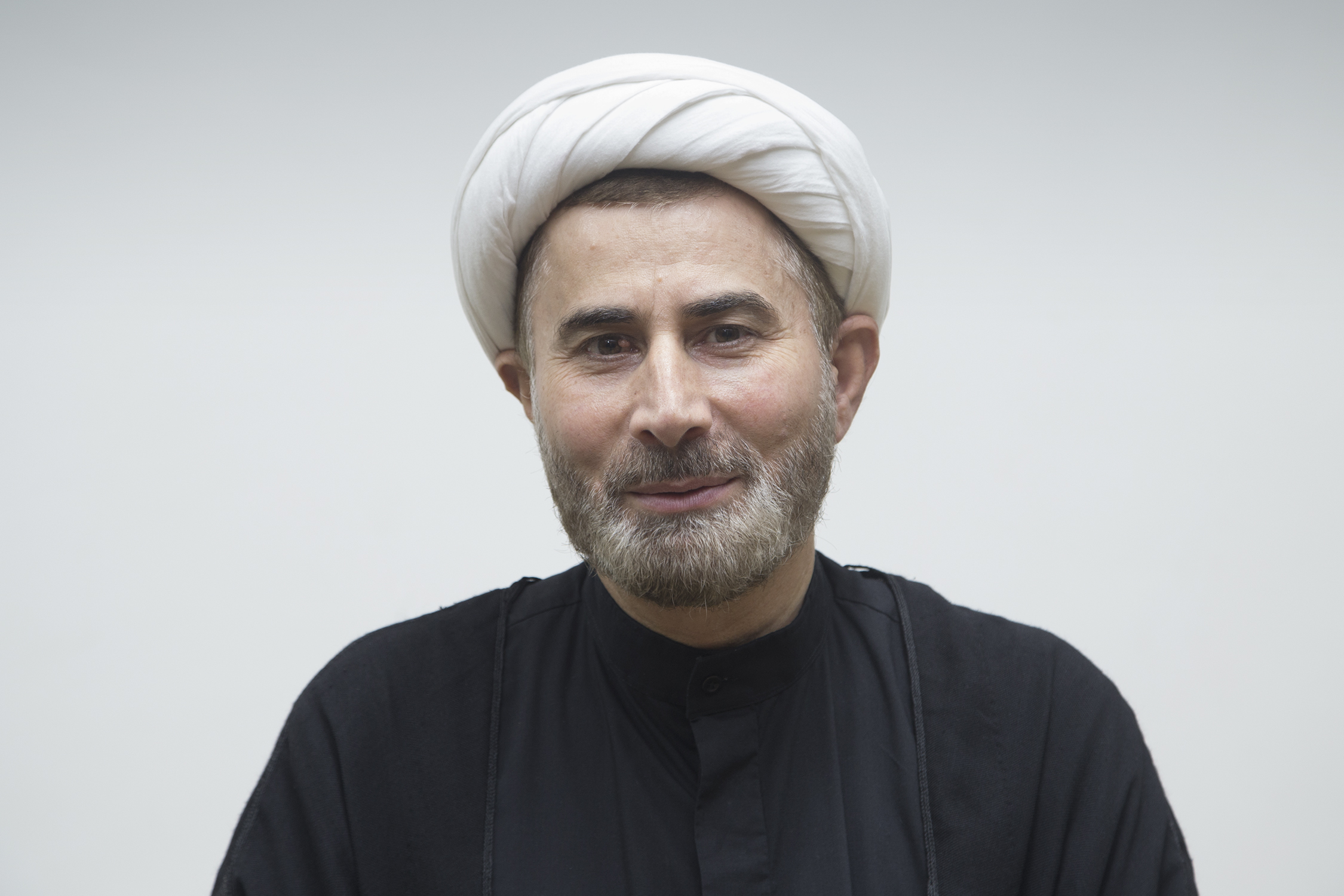
- Title: Sheikh

Personal life
- Born: 14 May 1962 (age 64) Abadan, Iran
- Other name: Arabic: شيخ منصور لقائي; Persian: شيخ منصور لقائى
- Website: www.ihic.org.au

Religious life
- Religion: Shia Islam

Senior posting
- Based in: Sydney
- Post: Sheikh
- Period in office: 1997–2010
- Predecessor: Founder

Dr Sheikh Mansour Leghaei (born 1962) is the founder and a director of the Imam Husain Islamic Centre and the School of Islamic Theology in Earlwood, Australia, serving as the imam from 1997 to 2010. He previously served in Nigeria, where in 1992 he opened an Education Centre called Ahul Bayt.

Leghaei is known in Australia and in the international media for his drawn out legal battle, spanning more than a decade, with the Australian Government and its Security Services. Leghaei challenged the government's security assessment of him in his bid to gain permanent residency. The case often draws parallels in the media and by his lawyers as a real life narrative of the novel The Trial by Franz Kafka, because the allegations, or the nature of the allegations against him, have never been revealed by the authorities and became a subject of discussion within the UNSW Law Journal

Leghaei is seen as a prominent member within the interfaith communities and was the chairman of the Marrickville Interfaith Round Table. Leghaei has attended a number of seminars to provide an Islamic perspective, including the Ecumenical Service on the Dead Sea Scrolls held at the Sydney Art Gallery, "Religious Therapy" on the occasion of World Cancer Day at the University of Sydney and "Spirituality of Great Traditions" at St. James' Church.

== Early life and education ==
Leghaei was born in Abadan, Iran, to a religious Shia family. He earned a PhD in Islamic Theosophy from the University of Qom, where he studied under a number of renowned scholars including, the Grand Ayatollah Hossein Vahid Khorasani, Grand Ayatollah Mousa Shubairi Zanjani, Ayatollah Hassan Hassanzadeh Amoli, Ayatollah Abdollah Javadi-Amoli, Ayatollah Mohammad-Taqi Mesbah-Yazdi, Sheik Mohammad Bahjat, and the late Ayatollah Bahrol-Oloom Mirdamadi.

== Nigeria ==
In 1992, Leghaei began his overseas religious services in Kano, Nigeria where a significant Shia minority exists. During this period Leghaei founded an education centre called Ahlul Bayt. Ahlul Bayt is a commonly used Islamic term referring to the "House (family) of the Prophet". However, in 1993, due to increasing violence in Nigeria, Leghaei returned to Iran with his family.

== Australia ==
According to documents rendered to the Federal Court of Australia, Leghaei with his family first arrived in Australia in 1994 under a Short Stay Business Visa and was employed as a Halal meat supervisor. The following year, he applied and successfully received a Religious Worker Visa which allowed him to work as a Muslim leader and travel internationally.

In 1996, Leghaei applied for permanent residency for himself and his family, and received bridging visas whilst their applications for residency were being reviewed. These bridging visas did not permit international travel. Supporting his application were character references from two members of parliament, Anthony Albanese and Robert McClelland, who has been the Attorney-General of Australia, but at the time was an opposition backbencher. McClelland, described Leghaei as: "an erudite man, conciliatory in tone and demeanour" who would be an "asset" to both the Muslim and Australian communities.

In 1997, Leghaei was refused permanent residency on the grounds that he had been assessed as a “risk to the national security of Australia.” In his appeal, Leghaei obtained a second character reference from McClelland. Despite being aware of the security concerns surrounding Leghaei, McClelland wrote in Leghaei's defence:

I was most surprised to learn that Sheik Leghaei's application had been rejected on the failure to satisfy part 4002 of Schedule 4 of the Migration Regulations, that is the public interest criteria.

Part 4002 of the regulations requires that an applicant "is not assessed" by the Australian Security Intelligence Organisation (ASIO) to be directly or indirectly a risk to security.

In the same year, Leghaei established the Imam Husain Islamic Centre with the stated aim of addressing the educational, welfare, and religious needs of the Muslim community. The unveiling of the centre was attended by a number of high-ranking public dignitaries, including the then Attorney-General Philip Ruddock, who provided his blessing by noting:

I do note very much the inclusive nature of the centre that you have developed.

Between 1997 and 2002, Leghaei pursued review proceedings and a formal assessment was carried out by ASIO. The substance of the assessment was that Leghaei was "directly or indirectly a risk to Australian national security."

Between 2002 and 2010, Leghaei appealed and endeavoured to ascertain the reasoning for the adverse security assessment and had hearings and matters before a range of bodies, including the Immigration Review Tribunal, the Federal Court and the High Court of Australia. These appeals failed because as a non-citizen of Australia, Leghaei was not entitled to natural justice or procedural fairness for the reason of national security considerations, and no legal board had the authority to examine the allegations or overrule the ASIO assessment.

After the failed appeals, Leghaei's next option was ministerial intervention by the then Immigration Minister, Chris Evans. A number of support rallies were organised for Leghaei, including a rally outside the Parliament House of Australia in Canberra, where more than 1000 supporters attended. However, Evans did not intervene.

Prior to the rally, a number of world bodies weighed into the judicial process surrounding Leghaei's case. The United Nations Human Rights Committee advised the Australian Government that "deporting Leghaei would be a possible violation of Dr Leghaei's human rights" and the International Covenant on Civil and Political Rights (ICCPR) also informed the Australian Government that "deporting Dr Leghaei was contrary to the right to a fair hearing".

Nevertheless, in mid May 2010, Leghaei's bridging visa was not extended and he was given six weeks to leave Australia. Leghaei complied by leaving on 27 June 2010, along with his wife and youngest child.

In June 2015, the Imam Husain Islamic Centre was to host an overseas speaker, Farrokh Sekaleshfar, who supports the death penalty for homosexuals in certain cases. Sekaleshfar voluntarily left Australia.

== Legal fight ==
Due to the nature of the allegations and the law and rights entitled to individuals of non–permanent residency, ascertaining the particulars of the accusations against Leghaei has been limited to Freedom of Information requests and snippets from restricted government, media, and legal reports. Leghaei's legal challenge of the government security assessment has been limited to a case built by ASIO that centred on the basis that he is "suspected of acts of foreign interference", the details of which have never been disclosed to the public nor to Leghaei, and according to media analysis are "the stuff we are not allowed to know".

Leghaei has also received letters from Government officials asking him to answer the allegations against him, when he has no idea what they are and has even been asked to deport himself.

A judge presiding over one of the appeals, Rodney Madgwick noted that Leghaei "appears to have performed valuable community services' and his family's deportation "may well cause hardship to utterly blameless Australian citizens", but that he had no jurisdiction to challenge the "merits and validity of ASIO's assessment" and could only decide whether Leghaei had received procedure fairness. He found Leghaei's"procedural fairness is reduced, in practical terms, to nothingness". The integral part of his judgement, dealing with the evidence, was kept secret. Only through appeals did Leghaei get limited understanding of the accusations wielded against him. One accusation was that on his return from a holiday in Iran in 1994, Leghaei carried a text he copied from Tehran University, which the Government translated as promoting "violent Jihad" and "the killing of infidels". However, on appeal it was later proven the translation was "flawed and misleading" and "key words were translated wrongly and entire paragraphs were added by the translator". ASIO ultimately admitted its translation was wrong and was ordered to pay a third of Leghaei's legal costs.

Another instance is the accusation that Leghaei was linked to a terrorist group in France called Ahul Bayt, due to the naming of the Islamic Centre he opened in Nigeria. Leghaei later emphasised that he knew no such group and that Ahul Bayt is a commonly used Islamic term.

Furthermore, in 2001, through a Freedom of Information request, Leghaei discovered that an anonymous letter, addressed to the then Immigration Minister Philip Ruddock, had alleged that "he was funded by the Iranian government and was a threat to the security of Australia and its Iranian community". These claims and others by Iranian dissidents have never been substantiated.

Leghaei's future return to Australia rested with the appeal by his lawyers to the UN who investigated the case further.

== United Nations decision ==
In March 2015, after almost five years of review, the UN Human Rights Committee concluded Australia violated the human rights of Sheikh Mansour and his family when it expelled him without adequately explaining why ASIO suspected him of being a threat to national security.

The UN Human Rights Committee established Australia's actions constituted an arbitrary interference with Leghaei's family, in breach of the International Convention on Civil and Political Rights ICCPR and summarised in the Committee report,

"In light of the 16 years of lawful resident and long-settled family life in Australia and the absence of any explanation from the state party on the reasons to terminate the author’s right to remain, except for the general assertion that it was done for ‘compelling reasons of national security’, the committee finds that the state party’s procedure lacked due process of law.”

The report further highlighted further breaches in particular article 17 of the ICCPR, which said Australia was obliged to provide Leghaei “with an effective and appropriate remedy, including a meaningful opportunity to challenge the refusal to grant him a permanent visa; and compensation”.

Ben Saul a professor of international law at Sydney University who acted for Leghaei in his UN complaint, noted the findings where "...the most authoritative interpretation of Australia’s binding obligations under the Human Rights treaty. To that extent the expectation of the United Nations is that Australia will comply with these decisions" and recognised Australia's "poor record" of complying with such findings.

In response to the findings the Australian Government had 180 days to respond, with a spokeswoman for the Attorney-General George Brandis noting: "The Government will give careful consideration, in good faith, to the views of the committee and respond within 180 days as is required."

== Criticisms of Leghai's deportation ==
As a result of indistinctness surrounding the allegations and the lack of natural justice pertained to Leghaei, a number of Nobel Peace Prize laureates and international human rights activists openly criticised the Australian Government for the vagueness of the accusations and the deficiencies in procedural fairness. These criticisms include

- Archbishop Desmond Tutu who said, "In South Africa we used to have detention without trial" and "In Australia you have deportation without trial."
- President of the International Progress Organization, Hans Köchler noted, "There can be no fair hearing of the case if the authorities refuse to disclose the allegations against Sheikh Mansour. We appeal to the government of Australia to revoke this decision."
- Nobel Peace Prize laureate Máiread Corrigan-Maguire wrote that "the deportation would breach the International Covenant on Civil and Political Rights, to which Australia is a party"
- In a statement, the former Bishop of Jerusalem Riah Hanna Abu El-Assal said "Dr Leghaei is not only not a threat to Australian national security but indeed through his peaceful presence and work both within the Muslim community and with other religious leaders and people, makes a great contribution to Australian society".
- Chandra Muzaffar, a Malaysian political scientist, Islamic reformist and activist said "The impending deportation of Sheikh Mansour Leghaei is a travesty of justice. There is no doubt at all that his human rights have been violated."

== eHawza ==
In 2008, Leghaei founded eHawza, an electronic Hawza program (Islamic Seminary) in English, enabling students to study by distance education, for a Diploma in Islamic Theology.

It contains over 500 academic lectures presented in English by Leghaei on a wide variety of topics, as well as over 5,000 pages of written resources.

== Awards and recognition ==
Leghaei has received a number of accolades, including a Community Service Award from the Australian MEFF Consortium Inc in 2000.

== Personal ==
Leghaei is the father of four children and is fluent in three languages: Persian, Arabic, and English.

== Quotes ==
- When questioned about his past: "I think my 16 years of peaceful life in Australia is my best evidence."
- At Sydney Airport, before departure: "My body will depart Australia but definitely my soul and my spirit will remain here forever."
- Asked if he would ever return to Australia: "My family is there; my community is there; my heart is there. I consider myself Australian."
