= Veiled Ambition =

2006 short film

- Written by: Celeste Geer
- Directed by: Celeste Geer
- Starring: Frida
- Theme music composer: Patrick Robertson
- Country of origin: Australia
- Original language: English
- No. of episodes: 1

Production
- Producer: Jeni McMahon
- Running time: 26 minutes

Original release
- Network: Special Broadcasting Service
- Release: June 20063 January – 25 July 2007

Veiled Ambition is a 1-part documentary created by Rebel Films for the SBS independent network following a Lebanese-Australian woman named Frida as she opens a shop selling fashionable clothing for Muslim women on Melbourne's Sydney Road.

The documentary follows Frida, described as a "little aussie battler in a scarf" as she develops her business in Melbourne while juggling a husband and home in Sydney and a pregnancy.

A down-turn in sales after police raids on Muslim homes in Sydney and Melbourne induces Frida to stage a fashion show at the Australian Bridal Expo in order to gain greater exposure, a month before she is due to give birth.

Veiled Ambition won the Palace Films Award for Short Film Promoting Human Rights at the 2006 Melbourne International Film Festival.
