= List of mosques in Australia =

This is a list of mosques in Australia.

A listing of mosques (masjids) and musallahs in Australia was maintained by Islamiaonline until around 2016.

== Australian Capital Territory ==
The following is a list of mosques in the Australian Capital Territory.

City	Suburb	Name	Images	Year	Group	Remarks
Canberra	Belconnen	Belconnen Crescent Musallah			Sunni	
Canberra	Gungahlin	Gungahlin Mosque		2017	Sunni	
Canberra	Kambah	Imam Hasan Centre			Shia	
Canberra	Mitchell	United Muslims of Canberra			Sunni- Salafi	
Canberra	Monash	Canberra Islamic Centre				Includes the Australian National Islamic Library
Canberra	Phillip	Phillip Musallah				
Canberra	Spence	Taqwa Masjid- Islamic Society of Belconnen			Sunni	
Canberra	Weston	Weston Creek Musallah			Sunni	
Canberra	Yarralumla	Canberra Mosque		1958	Sunni	The oldest mosque in Canberra

== New South Wales ==
The following is a list of mosques in New South Wales.

City	Suburb	Name	Images	Year	Group	Remarks
Albury-Wodonga	Lavington	Albury Mosque		1999	Sunni	
Armidale		University of New England Musalla				At the University of New England
Bathurst	Kelso	Al Sahabah Mosque			Sunni	
Bourke		Bourke cemetery mosque				
Broken Hill		William Street Mosque				Built in 1887 by the Afghan cameleers, it was preserved and opened as a museum in 1968. It is open by appointment or for jumu'ah (Fridays).
Byron Bay		Cavanbah Centre				Fridays (Jumu'ah only)
Central Coast	San Remo	San Remo Musalla				
Central Coast	Narara	Central Coast Mosque			Sunni	
Central Coast	Wyong	Central Coast Islamic Cultural Centre			Sunni	
Coffs Harbour		Southern Cross University Musalla				More a musalla than a mosque, located at the Southern Cross University
Dubbo	Dubbo South	Dubbo Mosque		2017	Sunni	
Griffith		Jamia Masjid Griffith			Sunni	
Maitland	Rutherford	Masjid Muhammad Mustafa (Rutherford Mosque)			Sunni	
Newcastle	Wallsend	Newcastle Mosque				Also known as the Wallsend Mosque.
Newcastle	Mayfield	Sultan Fatih Mosque			Sunni - Turkish community	Supported by the Diyanet (Turkish government)
Orange		Regional New South Wales Islamic Centre			Sunni	
Port Macquarie		Mid North Coast Islamic Society			Sunni	
Queanbeyan	Queanbeyan West	Queanbeyan Masjid			Sunni	
Tamworth	South Tamworth	Masjid Qubaa- Tamworth Mosque			Sunni	
Wagga Wagga		Islamic Studies Centre			1995	More a Musalla than a mosque. Originally designed Marcie Webster-Mannison for Charles Sturt University students and staff, it is also used by the Muslim community of Wagga Wagga and the Riverina region of New South Wales.
Wollongong	Cringila	Wollongong Bilal Camii			Sunni - Turkish community	Supported by the Diyanet (Turkish government) and operated by Islamic Community Milli Gorus Australia (ICMG)
Wollongong	Gwynneville	Masjid Omar			Sunni	Operated by the Australian Islamic Cultural Centre (AICC)
Wollongong	North Wollongong	Essence of Life			Sunni- Salafi	Operated by Ahlus Sunnah Wal Jama'ah (ASWJ)
Yass		Masjid Al Rahma			Sunni	Operated by the Lebanese Muslim Association (LMA)
Young		Umar bin Al-Khattab- Young Mosque		1994	Sunni	Operated by the Lebanese Muslim Association (LMA)
Sydney	Arncliffe	Al-Zahra Mosque			Shia	
Sydney	Artarmon	North Shore Masjid			Sunni	Operated by the Australian Islamic Cultural Centre (AICC)
Sydney	Auburn	ASWJ Auburn			Sunni-Salafi	Operated by Ahlus Sunnah Wal Jama'ah (ASWJ)
Sydney	Auburn	Auburn Islamic Community Centre			Sunni	
Sydney	Auburn	Auburn Gallipoli Mosque		1999	Sunni - Turkish community	Supported by the Diyanet (Turkish government)
Sydney	Auburn	Masjid Omar			Sunni	Operated by the Australian Islamic Cultural Centre (AICC)
Sydney	Bankstown	Al-Rasool Al-A'dham Mosque			Shia	Ayatollah Mohammad Hussein al-Ansari
Sydney	Bankstown	Masjid Abu Bakr Mosque			Sunni	
Sydney	Belmore	Al-Azhar Mosque			Sunni- Salafi	Operated by Ahlus Sunnah Wal Jama'ah (ASWJ)
Sydney	Blacktown	Afghan Osman Mosque			Sunni- Afghan	Afghan Community Support Association of NSW Australia
Sydney	Bonnyrigg	Bonnyrigg Mosque			Sunni - Turkish community	Supported by the Diyanet (Turkish government)
Sydney	Cabramatta	Othman Bin Affan Mosque			Sunni	Operated by the Lebanese Muslim Association (LMA)
Sydney	Casula	Global Islamic Youth Centre			Sunni- Salafi	Operated by Ahlus Sunnah Wal Jama'ah (ASWJ)
Sydney	Condell Park	Daar Ibn Abbas			Sunni	
Sydney	Dee Why	Dee Why Mosque			Sunni	
Sydney	Edmondson Park	The Australian Islamic House Masjid			Sunni	
Sydney	Erskineville	Erskineville Mosque			Sunni- Turkish community	Supported by the Diyanet (Turkish government)
Sydney	Greenacre	Islamic Prayer House			Shia	
Sydney	Greenacre	Khaled Ibn Al Walid Mosque		2019	Sunni	
Sydney	Greenacre	Malek Fahd Islamic School Mosque			Sunni	
Sydney	Granville	Granville Mosque			Sunni	
Sydney	Granville	Masjid Al Noor			Sunni	Associated with the Tablighi Jemaat
Sydney	Guildford	ICMG Guildford Mosque			Sunni- Turkish community	Operated by Islamic Community Milli Gorus Australia (ICMG)
Sydney	Guildford	Rahma Mosque			Sunni	
Sydney	Hinchinbrook	Masjid Bilal			Sunni	
Sydney	Lakemba	Lakemba Mosque		1977	Sunni	Lebanese Muslim Association; Also known as the Imam Ali Bin Abi Taleb Mosque; Reportedly Australia's largest mosque.
Sydney	Lakemba	Masjid As-Sunnah		2018	Sunni	
Sydney	Lakemba	Omar ibn Al-Khattab Mosque			Sunni	
Sydney	Liverpool	Liverpool Islamic Centre			Sunni- Salafi	Operated by Markaz Imam Ahmad (MIA)
Sydney	Liverpool	Masjid Bilal			Sunni	Operated by the Australian Islamic Cultural Centre (AICC)
Sydney	Marsden Park	Baitul Huda Mosque		1989	Ahmadiyya	
Sydney	Mascot	ICMG Mascot			Sunni- Turkish community	Operated by Islamic Community Milli Gorus Australia (ICMG)
Sydney	Matraville	Matraville Mosque			Sunni	
Sydney	Merrylands West	Daarul Arqam Mosque			Sunni- Pakistani community	
Sydney	Minto	Campbelltown Youth Centre			Sunni- Salafi	Operated by Ahlus Sunnah Wal Jama'ah (ASWJ)
Sydney	Mount Druitt	Mount Druitt Mosque			Sunni - Turkish community	Supported by the Diyanet (Turkish government)
Sydney	Padstow	United Muslims of Australia (UMA)			Sunni	
Sydney	Parramatta	Parramatta Mosque			Sunni	Operated by the Lebanese Muslim Association (LMA)
Sydney	Penshurst	Penshurst Mosque			Sunni	
Sydney	Prestons	Salaudin Al Ayubi Mosque			Sunni	
Sydney	Punchbowl	Masjid Baitul Manshurin			Sunni- Indonesian community	Operated by AIDA (Association of Islamic Dawah Australia)
Sydney	Punchbowl	Punchbowl Masjid			Sunni	Operated by Australian Islamic Mission (AIM) NSW
Sydney	Quakers Hill	Quakers Hill Masjid			Sunni	Operated by the Lebanese Muslim Association (LMA)
Sydney	Redfern	Redfern Mosque			Sunni- Turkish community	Supported by the Diyanet (Turkish government)
Sydney	Revesby	Revesby Mosque			Sunni- Salafi	Operated by Ahlus Sunnah Wal Jama'ah (ASWJ)
Sydney	Rockdale	Masjid Al Hidayah			Sunni	
Sydney	Smithfield	Albanian Mosque- Sheikh Albani			Sunni- Albanian community	
Sydney	Smithfield	Smithfield Mosque			Sunni- Bosnian community	
Sydney	St Marys	Masjid St Marys			Sunni	Operated by Islamic Practice and Dawah Circle (IPDC)
Sydney	Wolli Creek	Masjid Darul Imaan			Sunni	
Sydney	Zetland	Zetland Mosque			Sunni	

== Queensland ==
The following is a list of mosques in Queensland.

City	Suburb	Name	Images	Year	Group	Remarks
	Stockleigh	Bait-ul-Masroor		2013	Ahmadiyya Muslim Association	Accommodates 2,000 worshipers, men and women.
	Camp Hill	Mubarak Mosque			Ahmadiyya Muslim Association	
Brisbane	Algester	Algester Mosque		1990	Sunni	
Brisbane	Bald Hills	Masjid Taqwa			Sunni	
Brisbane	Berrinba	Salam Mosque Logan City			Sunni	
Brisbane	Brassall	Islamic Society of Ipswich			Sunni	
Brisbane	Brisbane CBD	Brisbane Community Education Centre			Sunni	
Brisbane	Camira	Camira Mosque (Masjid Baitul A'la)			Sunni - Indonesian community	Operated by AIDA (Association of Islamic Dawah QLD)
Brisbane	Crestmead	Crestmead Mosque			Sunni	
Brisbane	Darra	Darra Mosque			Sunni	
Brisbane	Forestdale	Brisbane Turkish Islamic Society			Sunni - Turkish community	Supported by the Diyanet (Turkish government)
Brisbane	Eight Mile Plains	Bosnian Islamic Centre		2014	Sunni - Bosnian community	
Brisbane	Hillcrest	Hillcrest Community Youth Centre (HCYC)			Sunni	
Brisbane	Holland Park	Holland Park Mosque		1908	Sunni	Original building constructed in 1908, redeveloped as the modern mosque later.
Brisbane	Kuraby	Masjid al-Farooq (Kuraby Mosque)		1990s	Sunni	Original mosque was burnt down in 2001, rebuilt later in the year.
Brisbane	Logan Central	United Muslims of Brisbane (UMB)			Sunni- Salafi	
Brisbane	Logan Central	Ali Akber Islamic Center			Shia	
Brisbane	Loganlea	Indonesian Muslim Centre of QLD			Sunni - Indonesian community	
Brisbane	Lutwyche	Masjidus Sunnah		1990s	Sunni	
Brisbane	Moorooka	Moorooka Mosque		2015	Sunni - Somali community	
Brisbane	North Ipswich	Fatima Zahra Imamia Centre			Shia	
Brisbane	Slacks Creek	Masjid Ur Rahmaan/ Australian Centre for Unity		2014	Sunni	Operated by Islamic Practice and Dawah Circle (IPDC)
Brisbane	Slacks Creek	Zainabia Islamic Center			Shia	
Brisbane	Underwood	Islamic Shia Council of QLD			Shia	
Brisbane	West End	West End Mosque			Sunni	
Brisbane	Woolloongabba	Buranda Islamic Mosque			Sunni	
Brisbane	Woodridge	ICMG Woodridge			Sunni- Turkish community	Operated by Islamic Community Milli Gorus Australia (ICMG)
Bundaberg	Bundaberg North	Turkish Islamic Association of Bundaberg			Sunni - Turkish community	Supported by the Diyanet (Turkish government)
Cairns	Cairns North	Abu Bakr As-Saddiq Mosque/ Cairns Mosque		2014	Sunni	
Cairns	Bungalow	Masjid Baitul-Izzah			Sunni - Indonesian community	Operated by AIDA (Association of Islamic Dawah Far North QLD)
Gatton		Lockyer Valley Islamic Association			Sunni	
Gold Coast	Arundel	Islamic Society of Gold Coast		1995	Sunni	
Gold Coast	Southport	Southport Masjid			Sunni	
Gold Coast	Worongary	Worongary Islamic Centre		2024	Sunni	Operated by the Islamic Multicultural Association of Gold Coast (IMAGC)
Gympie		Gympie Cultural Centre			Sunni	
Hervey Bay	Pialba	Fraser Coast Muslim Community Centre			Sunni	
Mackay	Bakers Creek	Islamic Society of Mackay			Sunni	
Mareeba		Mareeba and District Memorial Mosque		1970	Sunni - Albanian community	Built by the Albanian community during 1969–1970, and dedicated to Australian soldiers who lost their lives in war.
Mount Isa	The Gap (Mount Isa)	Rehman Mosque			Sunni	
Rockhampton		Islamic Society of Central Queensland			Sunni	
Sunshine Coast	Maroochydore	Muslim Organisation of Sunshine Coast			Sunni	
Toowoomba	Harristown	Toowoomba Mosque		2014	Sunni	Originally a church built in 1910 prior to being redeveloped as a mosque in 2014. Damaged and later rebuilt following a 2015 arson attack.
Townsville	Mundingburra	Townsville Islamic Society		1980s	Sunni	

== South Australia ==
The following is a list of mosques in South Australia.

City	Suburb	Name	Images	Year	Group	Remarks
Adelaide	Adelaide	Central Adelaide Mosque		1888		The Adelaide Mosque is the oldest surviving mosque in Australia and the first to be built in an Australian city. Erected in 1888–89, it was designed to meet the spiritual needs of Muslim cameleers and traders coming in from work in South Australia's northern regions.
Adelaide	Park Holme	Masjid Omar Bin Al Khattab				Also known as the Marion Masjid; Islamic Society of South Australia
Adelaide	Woodville North	Islamic Arabic Centre & Masjid Al Khalil				
Adelaide	Gilles Plains	Wandana Mosque				
Adelaide	Pooraka	Imam Ali Mosque			Shia	
Adelaide	Parafield Gardens	Parafield Gardens Masjid			Sunni- Turkish community	Operated by Islamic Community Milli Gorus Australia (ICMG)
Adelaide	Green Fields	Green Fields Mosque				
Adelaide	Elizabeth Grove	Elizabeth Mosque				
Adelaide	Gepps Cross	Layla Sadri Tatar Community Centre				
Adelaide	Kilburn	Husayniat 'Ahl Albayt				
Adelaide	Royal Park	Royal Park Mosque				
Adelaide	Beverley	Mahmood Mosque				Adelaide's largest mosque
Adelaide	Mile End	Islamic Information Centre of SA				
Adelaide	Enfield	Faizan e Madina				
Adelaide	Virginia	SA Multicultural Centre- Virginia Masjid			Sunni	Operated by Islamic Practice and Dawah Circle (IPDC)
Murray Bridge		Murray Bridge Turkish Mosque				
Renmark		Renmark Mosque			Sunni- Turkish community	Supported by the Diyanet (Turkish government)
Whyalla		Whyalla Mosque				
Marree		Marree Mosque		1862	Afghan	Considered to be the first mosque built on the Australian continent. No longer in use.

== Tasmania ==
The following is a list of mosques in Tasmania.

City	Suburb	Name	Images	Year	Group	Remarks
Burnie		House of Guidance- Burnie Masjid				
Hobart	West Hobart	Hobart Mosque		1985		
Launceston	Kings Meadows	Masjid Launceston		2021		

== Victoria ==
The following is a list of mosques in Victoria.

City	Suburb	Name	Images	Year	Group	Remarks
Melbourne	Altona North	Al-Asr Society of Australia			Shia	
Melbourne	Brunswick	ICMG Brunswick			Sunni- Turkish community	Operated by Islamic Community Milli Gorus Australia (ICMG)
Melbourne	Brunswick	Islamic Information & Support Centre of Australia			Sunni- Salafi	Operated by Ahlus Sunnah Wal Jama'ah (ASWJ)
Melbourne	Carlton North	Carlton Mosque		1969	Sunni - Albanian community	Built by the Albanian community in the late 1960s, it is the oldest mosque in Melbourne and listed on the Victorian Heritage Register.
Melbourne	Melbourne CBD	Islamic Council of Victoria			Sunni	
Melbourne	Coburg	Fatih mosque			Sunni - Turkish community	
Melbourne	Coolaroo	Hume Islamic Youth Centre			Sunni- Salafi	Operated by Ahlus Sunnah Wal Jama'ah (ASWJ)
Melbourne	Dandenong	Dandenong Mosque		1985	Sunni - Albanian community	Built by the Albanian community in 1985, it is one of the earliest mosques in Victoria.
Melbourne	Dandenong	Emir Sultan Mosque			Sunni- Turkish community	Operated by Islamic Community Milli Gorus Australia (ICMG)
Melbourne	Dandenong	Rasul Akram Association			Shia	
Melbourne	Dandenong	TAHA Association Centre			Shia	
Melbourne	Doncaster East	UMMA Centre		1984	Sunni	
Melbourne	Doveton	Omar Farooq Mosque			Sunni- Afghan community	
Melbourne	Doveton	PGCC Mosque		2016	Sunni	Operated by Pillars of Guidance Community Centre (PGCC)
Melbourne	Deer Park	Deer Park Mosque		1993	Sunni - Bosnian community	
Melbourne	Fawkner	Imam Ali Islamic Centre			Shia	
Melbourne	Fitzroy	BSN Central Mosque			Sunni	
Melbourne	Heidelberg Heights	Elsedeaq Heidelberg Mosque			Sunni	
Melbourne	Hoppers Crossing	El-Zahra Centre			Shia	
Melbourne	Huntingdale	Huntingdale Mosque			Sunni	
Melbourne	Keysborough	Keysborough Turkish Islamic and Cultural Centre			Sunni- Turkish community	Supported by the Diyanet (Turkish government)
Melbourne	Lysterfield	Islamic Society of Melbourne Eastern Region		1986	Sunni	
Melbourne	Maidstone	Maidstone Mosque		2013	Sunni	
Melbourne	Meadow Heights	Meadow Heights Mosque		2012	Sunni- Turkish community	Operated by Islamic Community Milli Gorus Australia (ICMG)
Melbourne	Noble Park	Noble Park Mosque			Sunni- Bosnian community	
Melbourne	Preston	Preston Mosque			Sunni - Arabic community	
Melbourne	Ravenhall	Masjid Ar-Rahma		2013	Sunni- Sri Lankan community	
Melbourne	Reservoir	Reservoir Mosque			Sunni - Albanian community	
Melbourne	Reservoir	Masjid Ahlul Bait			Shia	
Melbourne	Sunshine	Sunshine Mosque		1985	Sunni - Turkish community	The largest mosque in Victoria Supported by the Diyanet (Turkish government)
Melbourne	Thomastown	Thomastown Mosque		early 1990s	Sunni - Turkish Community	Built (early 1990s) by the Turkish Australian community and located opposite Thomastown train station. Supported by the Diyanet (Turkish government)
Melbourne	Tarneit	Melbourne Grand Mosque		2020	Sunni	
Melbourne	Tarneit	Melbourne Multicultural Centre- Golden Wattle Masjid		2018	Sunni	Operated by Islamic Practice and Dawah Circle (IPDC)
Melbourne	Truganina	Al-Taqwa Masjid		1986	Sunni	Located on the grounds of Al-Taqwa College
Melbourne	Windsor	Australia Western Thrace Turkish Association of Vic			Sunni- Turkish community	
Ballarat	Canadian	Masjid Abu Bakr As-Siddiq- Islamic Society of Ballarat		2020	Sunni	
Bendigo	East Bendigo	Bendigo Islamic Community Centre		2025	Sunni	
Cobram		Cobram Mosque- Cobram Islamic Association		2020	Sunni	
Geelong	Manifold Heights	Geelong Mosque- Islamic Society of Geelong		1993	Sunni	
Goulburn Valley (Shepparton- Mooroopna)		Albanian Mosque		1960	Sunni - Albanian community	Built by the Albanian community in the late 1950s, it is the first and oldest mosque in both Shepparton and Victoria.
Goulburn Valley (Shepparton- Mooroopna)		Mooroopna Mosque		1970s	Sunni - Turkish community	Supported by the Diyanet (Turkish government)
Goulburn Valley (Shepparton- Mooroopna)		Imam Kadhim Mosque- The Iraqi Community Centre		2000	Shia - Iraqi community	Built by the Iraqi community who came as refugees in the 1990s to Australia, this was the first Shia mosque built in Victoria in 2000.
Goulburn Valley (Shepparton- Mooroopna)		Masjid Nabi Akram (SW)		2013	Shia - Afghan (Hazara) community	
Mildura		Mildura Mosque			Sunni- Turkish community	Supported by the Diyanet (Turkish government)

== Western Australia ==
The following is a list of mosques in Western Australia.

City	Suburb	Name	Images	Year	Group	Remarks
Perth	Armadale	Armadale Masjid and Islamic Center		2016	Sunni	Operated by Islamic Practice and Dawah Circle (IPDC)
Perth	Belmont	Furqan Islamic Centre				
Perth	Caversham	Swan Valley Mosque and Islamic Centre		2007	Sunni- Bosnian community	
Perth	Gosnells	Al Rahman Mosque				
Perth	Langford	Al Latief Mosque				
Perth	Malaga	Al Khalil Mosque		2019		
Perth	Maylands	The Islamic Centre of West Australia			Sunni- Salafi	Operated by Ahlus Sunnah Wal Jama'ah (ASWJ)
Perth	Mirrabooka	Al Taqwa Mosque		1997		
Perth	Padbury	Al Majid Mosque				
Perth	Perth	Perth Mosque	Perth mosque	1906	Sunni	The oldest mosque in Perth and the second oldest purpose-built mosque in Australia.
Perth	Queens Park	Suleymaniye Mosque		1982	Sunni- Turkish community	Supported by the Diyanet (Turkish government)
Perth	Rivervale	Rivervale Mosque		1977		Perth's second oldest metropolitan mosque and headquarters of the Islamic Council of Western Australia.
Perth	Rockingham	Ar Rukun Mosque		1998		
Perth	Southern River	Masjid Ibrahim				
Perth	Thornlie	Thornlie Mosque				
Perth	Wattle Grove	Al Falah Mosque		2015		
Perth	Wangara	Al Hidaya Centre			Sunni	
Geraldton		Geraldton Mosque			Sunni	
Kalgoorlie		Masjid e Quba Islamic Center				
Karratha		Karratha Mosque			Sunni	
Katanning		Katanning Mosque		1980	Sunni- Malay community	The mosque was opened in 1980 after it was built by the local Islamic community who arrived in Katanning in 1974 from Christmas Island and Cocos Islands.
Newman		Newman Mosque			Sunni	
Port Hedland		Islamic Association of North Western Australia			Sunni	

== Northern Territory ==
The following is a list of mosques in the Northern Territory.

City	Suburb	Name	Images	Year	Group	Remarks
Darwin	Darwin CBD	Darwin CBD Musalla		2019		Established and managed by United Muslims NT Inc since 2019.
Darwin	Palmerston	Palmerston Mosque		2016	Sunni	
Darwin	Wanguri	Darwin Mosque- Islamic Society of Darwin		1971	Sunni	
Darwin	Winnellie	Northern Territory Momineen Centre		2021	Shia	Established and managed by Northern Territory Momineen Inc since 2021.
Katherine		Katherine Musalla				Established and managed by United Muslims NT Inc.
Alice Springs	Larapinta	Alice Springs Afghan Mosque		Late 1800s	Sunni	The mosque, originally built by Afghan immigrants in late 1800s, closed during World War II and rebuilt in 1993.

== Australian external territories ==
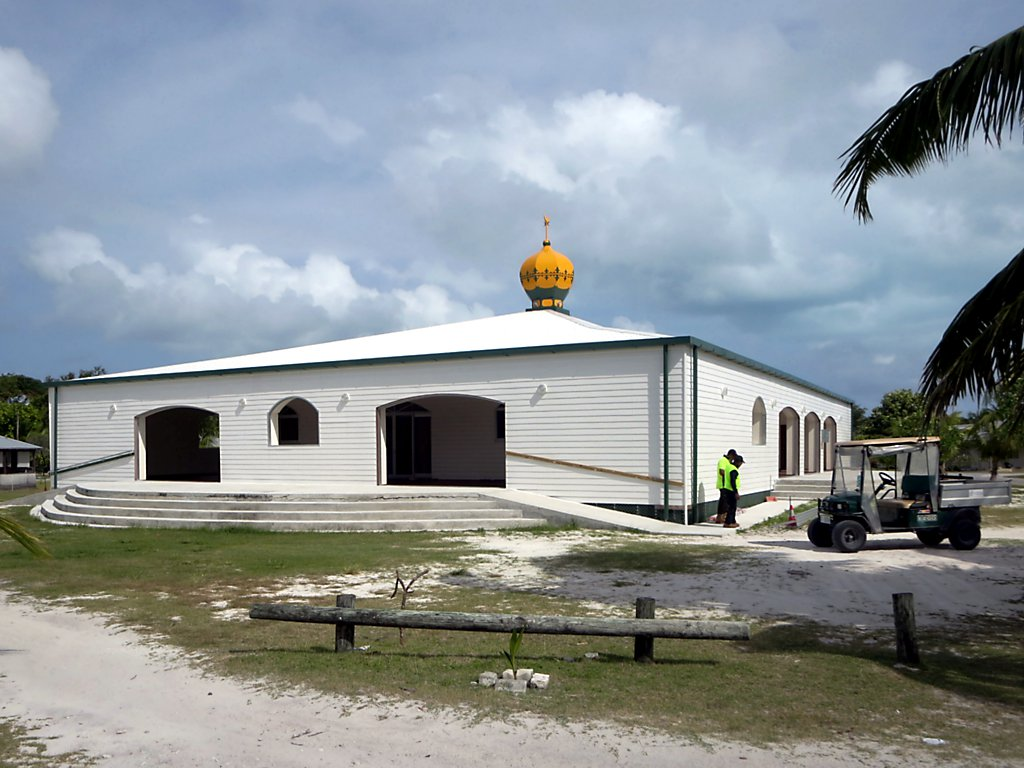
Home Island Mosque

=== Christmas Island ===
There is one mosque on Christmas Island, which is located in Flying Fish Cove, the main town on the island.

=== Cocos (Keeling) Islands ===
The territory of Cocos (Keeling) Islands is an external territory of Australia. There are only two permanently inhabited islands:

- The West Island Mosque is a heritage-listed mosque at Alexander Street, on West Island.
- The Home Island Mosque is on Home Island.

== See also ==
- List of mosques in Oceania
