= Mareeba Mosque =

Mosque in Queensland, Australia

Mareeba Mosque Mareeba and District Memorial Mosque
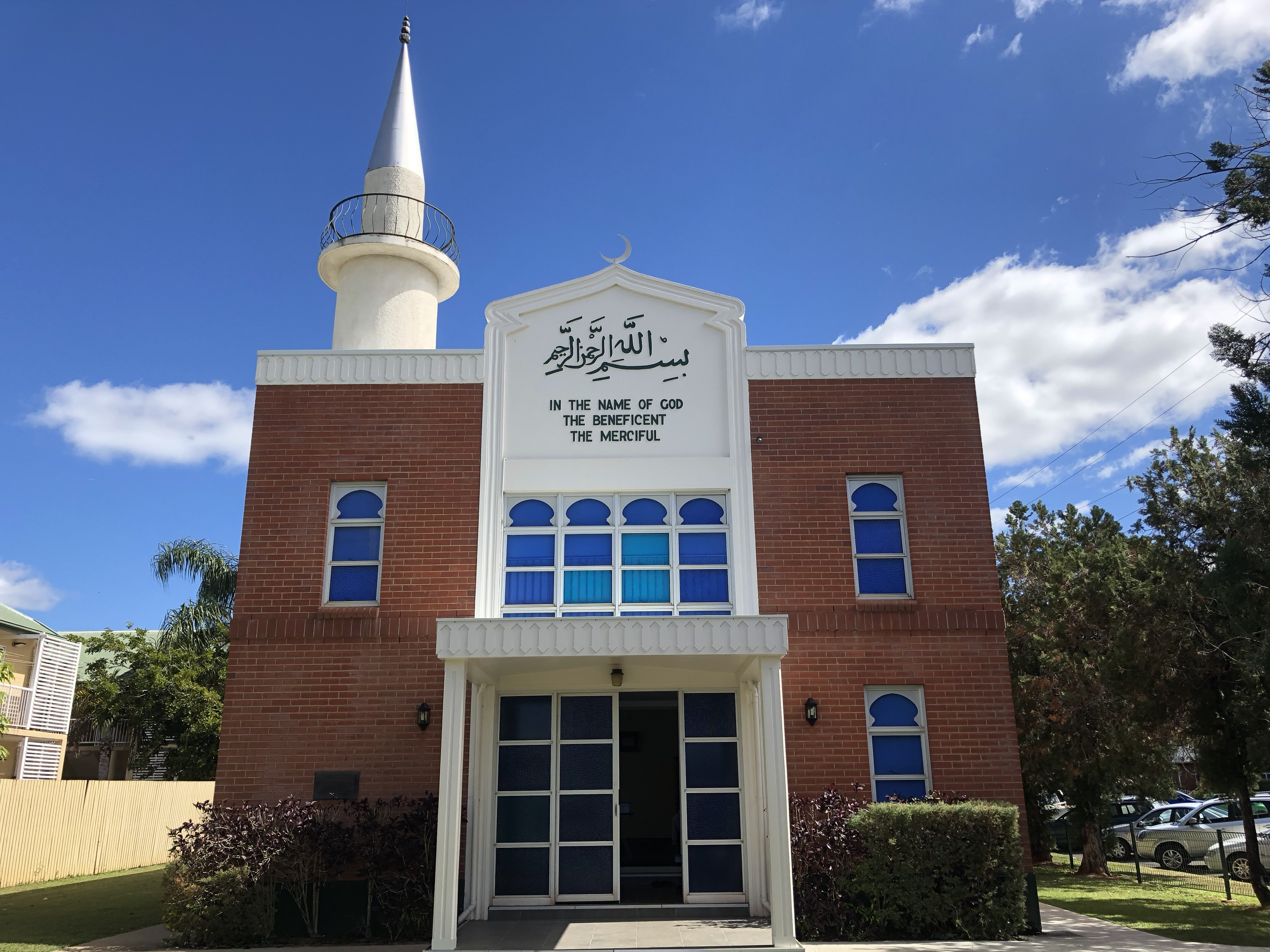

- Location in Queensland

Religion
- Affiliation: Sunni Islam
- Ecclesiastical or organisational status: Mosque
- Ownership: Albanian Australian Moslem Society (Mareeba Islamic Society)
- Status: Active

Location
- Location: 108 Walsh Street, Mareeba, Queensland 4880
- Country: Australia
- Coordinates: 16°59′21″S 145°25′22″E

Architecture
- Type: Mosque architecture
- Groundbreaking: 1969
- Completed: 1970
- Minaret: 1
- Inscriptions: 1

Website
- facebook.com/Mareeba-Islamic-Society-339795152458/

The Mareeba Mosque, officially known as the Mareeba and District Memorial Mosque, is a mosque located in Mareeba, a rural town in Queensland, Australia. The building contains a minaret, and an adjacent hall used for community functions that houses the library and visitors room. Associated with the Albanian Australian community, the mosque (built late 1960s) is owned by and the centre of the Albanian Australian Moslem Society (Mareeba Islamic Society).

== History ==
In Mareeba, most of the Muslim population is composed of Albanian Australians, many from Albania (Korçë region), others from Bosnia and Herzegovina, Kosovo and Montenegro. Beginning in the interwar period Albanian immigrants arrived and following the Second World War, Bosniaks, Tatars and other Albanians settled in North Queensland in areas where sugar cane was grown like Cairns. The local Albanian community devoted its efforts toward preserving traditional values and their transmission, especially since they came from Albania where religion was strongly suppressed by the communist government. They sought to establish Islamic institutions and structures they had left in their homeland.

Led by an Albanian imam from Cairo, new Albanian arrivals to Mareeba formed an organisation, the Albanian Australian Moslem Society (Mareeba Islamic Society) in 1953. A house was bought by the society and repurposed into a mosque. At the time, some 70 Muslim households from multicultural backgrounds lived in Mareeba. The project to build a mosque began with land bought by the Islamic Society for $4,000 in 1968 on the corner of Walsh and Lloyd Street, followed by construction (1969). The Mareeba Muslim community provided finances for the entire process of buying, planning and building a mosque.

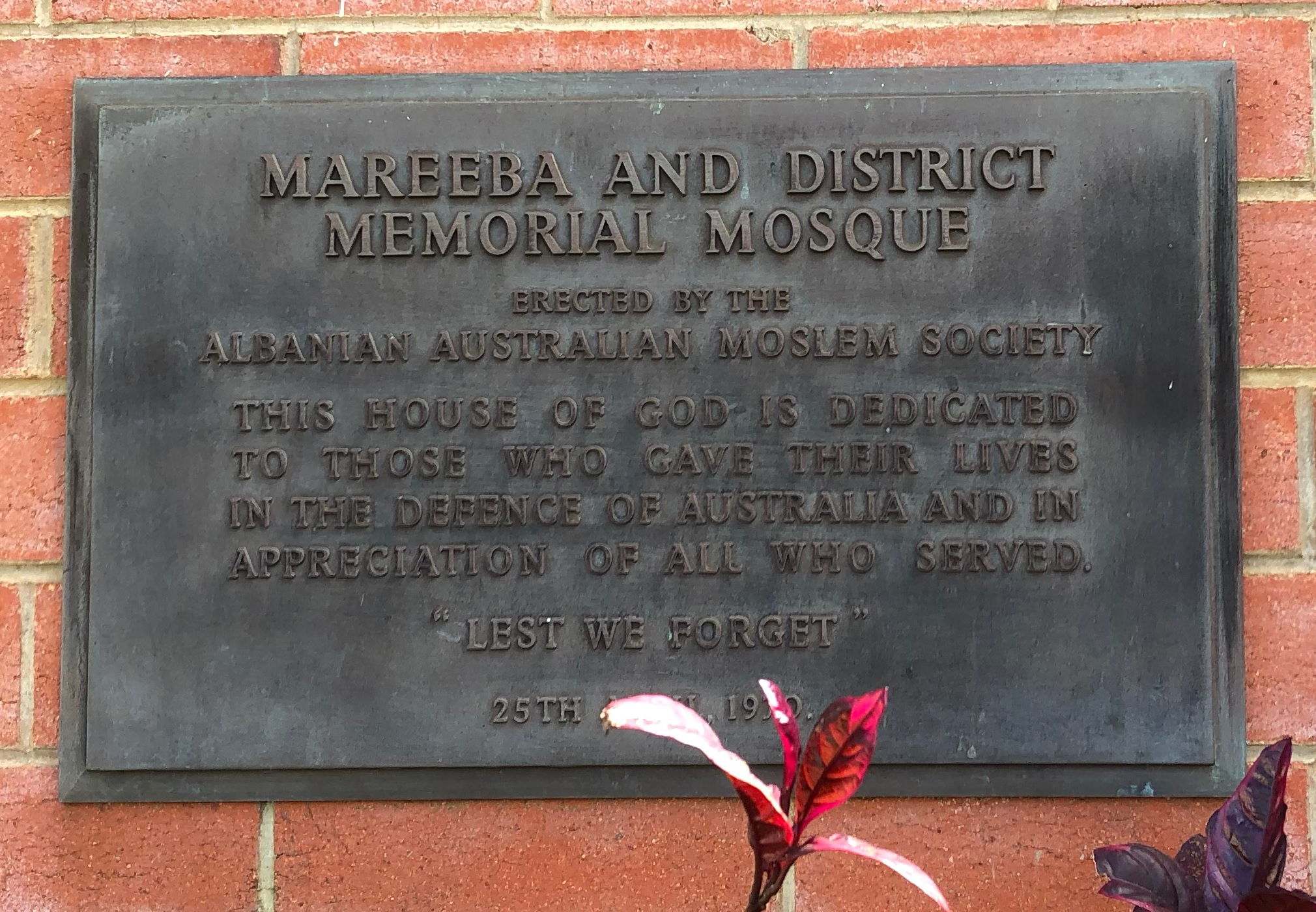
Plaque commemorating mosque founding and dedication to fallen Australian soldiers

Assistance came from Tom Roy, a Mareeba architect who designed the mosque and Patty Cannon, a local builder who constructed it. The Islamic Society's budget lacked funds for a minaret and Islamic arch, and Cannon added them from his own accord with the minaret being an imitation, serving only as a design feature. A new modern brick building replaced the previous house serving as a mosque.

Among the Albanian communities within Australia, reverence is maintained for its contribution to the World War Two effort and its Australian war veterans. On Anzac day, 1970, the Mareeba mayor opened the new mosque and it was dedicated to Australian soldiers who died in war. An inscription was added by the Albanian community as an expression of its desire to forge close ties with the wider local population. It reads: "Mareeba and District Memorial Mosque, Erected by the Albanian Australian Moslem Society: This house of God is dedicated to those who gave their lives in the defence of Australia and in appreciation of all who served. 'Lest We Forget' 25th April, 1970". Attached to the front mosque brick wall (left side), the inscription is a war memorial and part of the Mareeba Shire War Memorial Heritage Asset List.

Shortly after the mosque opening, the Mareeba imam was granted the ability to register marriages. As part of closer relations, the wider community gave an area of the Mareeba cemetery to the Muslim community for burials and graves, that face westward in accordance with Islamic tradition.

The mosque since its establishment has become a centre for the local Muslim community. By 1986, the Muslim membership of the Mareeba Islamic Society numbered some 300 people. A hall was added (1988) to the mosque toward the rear end of the premises for celebratory events and Muslim functions, that includes a visitors room and library. In the early twenty first century, parts of the Mareeba Albanian community are either third, fifth or sixth generation locals. The mosque serves as a focal point for the Albanian community that assists in preserving family traditions and religious identity.

The 40-year anniversary of the mosque was celebrated in 2010. In September 2014, the word "evil" was sprayed on the Mareeba mosque and the incident was blamed on anti-Muslim backlash over anti-terrorism police raids in Brisbane and Sydney. The Mareeba mosque has participated in National Mosque Open Day, held across Australia for members of the general public to visit, support or acquaint themselves with Islam and Muslims.

Mareeba Islamic Society's members are mainly farmers. In the early twenty first century, the mosque congregation is multicultural, composed of locally well established Albanians and newer Muslim arrivals from Kosovo, Bosnia, Uzbekistan and Turkey. The Albanian imam provides weekly lessons and lectures, with other Islamic lessons conducted on the weekend. Beginning from the early 2000s, Benjamin Murat served as the Imam. In 2014, the Mareeba Islamic Society and nearby Cairns Mosque employed Imam Waseem Jappie who served both communities from 2014-2021. In 2022, the Mareeba Islamic Society employed Shaykh Ibrahim Newman; originating from Sydney he attended an Islamic seminary overseas before serving in Islamic schools and mosques in Sydney for 10 years.

In 2024, the Mareeba Muslim community were the feature of a documentary made by the OnePath Network drawing attention to their longstanding commitment to Islam in regional QLD which drew 1 million views on YouTube. In 2025, efforts were made to establish the Two Rivers Community School; the first rural Islamic school in Australia which will be located at 405 Chewko Rd, Mareeba.

== See also ==
- Islam in Australia
- List of mosques in Australia
- Other Albanian mosques in Australia
  - Carlton North
  - Dandenong
  - Shepparton
