= Baitul Huda Mosque, Sydney =

Mosque in Sydney, New South Wales, Australia

Baitul Huda Mosque
- Urdu: مسجد بیت الہدیٰ
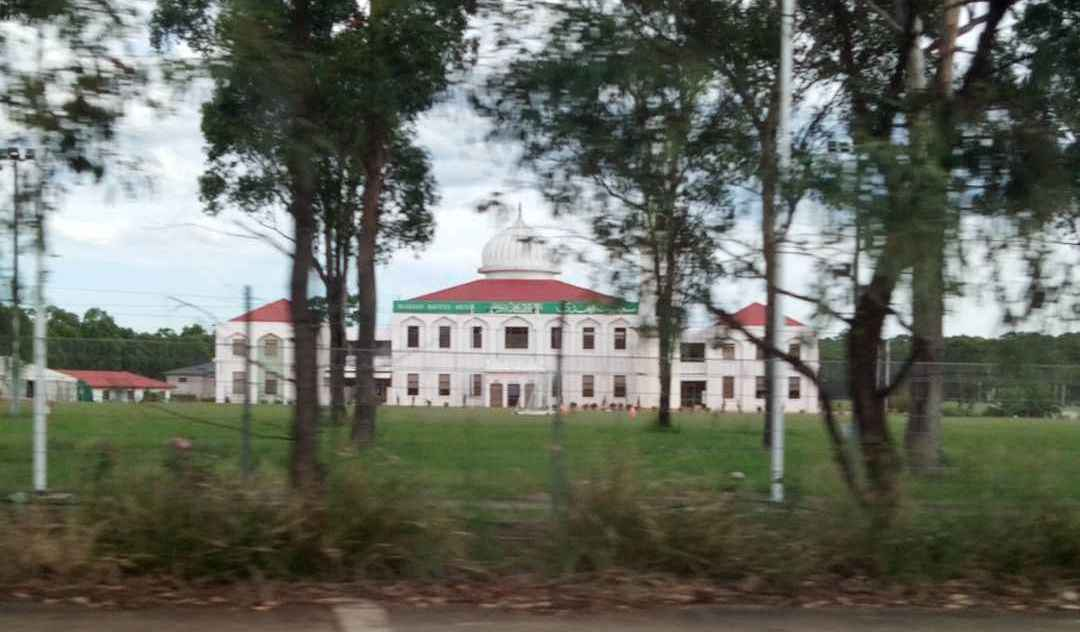
- The mosque in 2024

- Location in greater metropolitan Sydney

Religion
- Affiliation: Ahmadiyya
- Ecclesiastical or organizational status: Mosque
- Status: Active

Location
- Location: Marsden Park, Sydney, New South Wales, Australia
- Interactive map of Baitul Huda Mosque
- Coordinates: 33°43′32.8″S 150°50′33.8″E

Architecture
- Type: Mosque
- Completed: July 1989

Specifications
- Dome: 1
- Minaret: 1

Website
- www.baitulhudamosque.org.au

The Baitul Huda Mosque (Urdu: مسجد بیت الہدیٰ, lit. 'House of Guidance') is an Ahmadi mosque located in the Sydney suburb of Marsden Park, in New South Wales, Australia. The mosque is run by the Ahmadiyya Muslim Community (AMC).

== History ==
The land for the mosque at Marsden Park (Sydney) was purchased in 1983. Mirza Tahir Ahmad, Khalifatul Masih IV laid the foundation stone on 30 September on his first visit to Australia in 1983.

The first missionaries, Mr. Shakil Ahmad Munir and his wife, Mrs. Naima Munir, came to Australia on 5 July 1985. The Ahmadiyya Jamaat in Australia was registered as the Ahmadiyya Muslim Association of Australia Inc. on 7 September 1987.

The mosque was opened on the second visit of Mirza Tahir Ahmad, Khalifatul Masih IV. in July 1989.

In 2008, an extension hall was constructed to celebrate the centenary of Khilafat (successors who led the organisation).

In December 2015, Prime Minister Malcolm Turnbull acknowledged the community's contribution to Australia. Ahmadiyya Muslim Association Australia national spokesman Aziz Omer said, "We are loyal to Australia and we want our kids to be loyal to Australia", with association members delivering 500,000 Loyalty to Homeland leaflets. Australia Day celebrations at the mosque includes a flag-raising ceremony, the singing of the national anthem and a barbecue.

In April 2024, a member of the mosque, Mr Faraz Tahir, was killed while attempting to protect others from a knife-wielding assailant at the Bondi Junction Westfield shopping centre. A funeral was held for Mr Tahir at the Baitul Huda Mosque and was attended by NSW Premier Chris Minns and Prime Minister Anthony Albanese, who said: "Today, as our nation remembers his bravery and honours his life, we affirm that Australia will always be grateful to Faraz Tahir".

== See also ==
- Islam in Australia
- Islamic schools and branches
- List of mosques in Australia
- List of Ahmadiyya buildings and structures
