= Two Rivers Community School =

Location
- 405 Chewko Rd; Mareeba, QLD

Information
- Motto: Service, Knowledge, Devotion
- Religious affiliation: Islam
- Established: 2026

Two Rivers Community School is an independent, Islamic, co-educational school, located in Mareeba, Queensland. It is administered by Independent Schools Queensland, planning to open for enrolments in January 2026 and is the first Islamic school built in rural Australia.

== History ==
There is a long-standing Muslim Albanian community that has resided in Mareeba since the 1920's who have played an active role in the wider community. In 1970, the Mareeba Mosque was established helping cement the community's roots in the town. In 2021, 2022, and 2023 there was significant inter-state migration from southern states such as New South Wales and Victoria to Queensland as people sought greater work-life balance and quality of life. Muslims seeking a rural lifestyle migrated to Mareeba as there was already an existing Muslim community based around the mosque. As a result of the increase in the Muslim community, there was a need to establish an independent Muslim school.

To remain in line with the rural lifestyle of the town, the school is located on 70 acres of Australian bush and will emphasise outdoor education. Founders of the school have said, "This is the first Islamic educational facility north of Brisbane, offering immersive learning, nature integration and strong Islamic principles. Two River Community School fills a crucial gap, ensuring Mareeba’s Islamic community thrives for generations"
