= Al-Rasool Al-A'dham Mosque =

Mosque in Sydney, New South Wales, Australia

- Arabic: مسجد الرسول الاعظم, romanized: Masjid Al-Rasool AlAdham
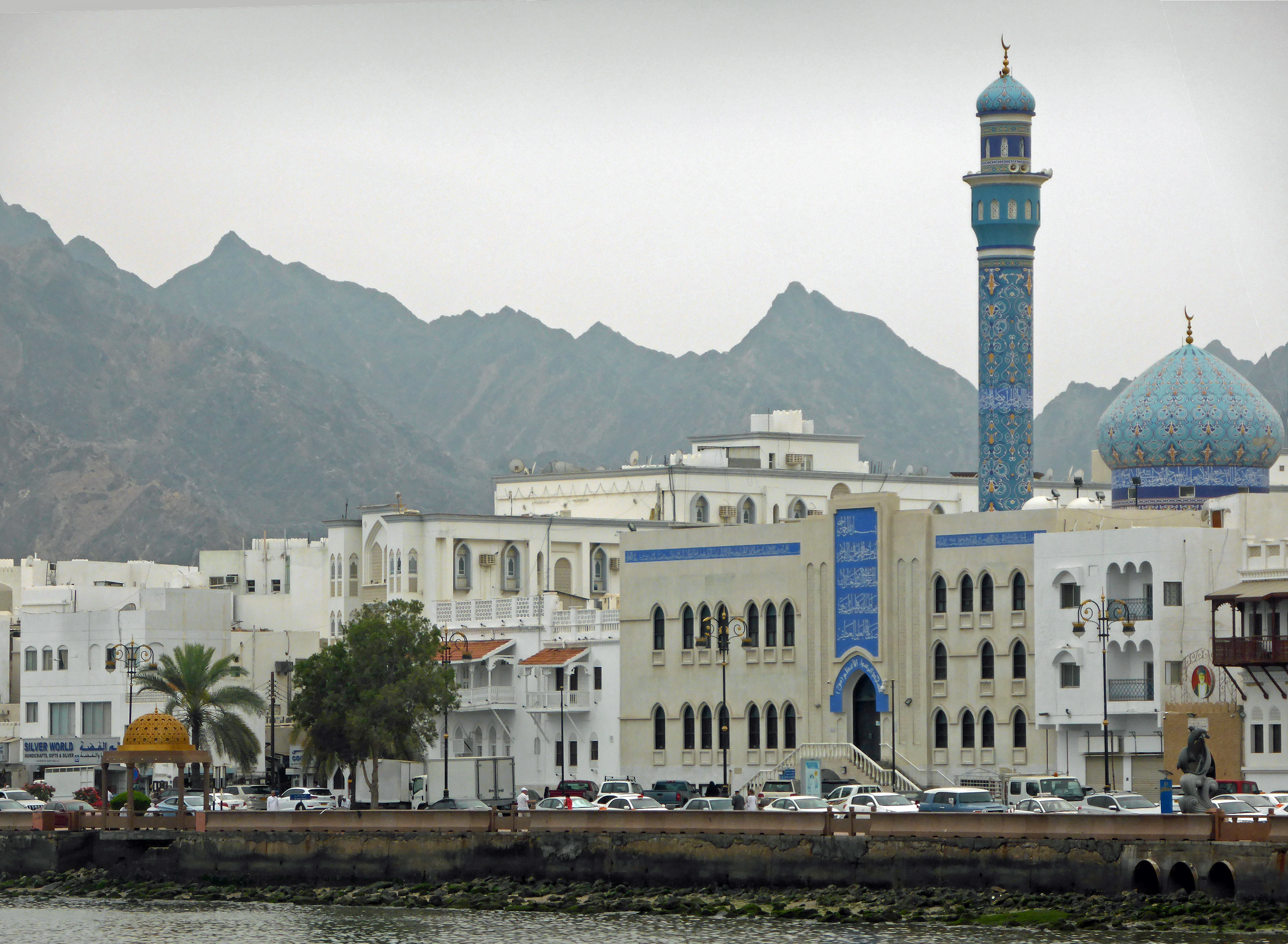
- Al-Rasool Al-A'dham Mosque

- Location in greater metropolitan Sydney

Religion
- Affiliation: Shia Islam
- Ecclesiastical or organizational status: Mosque
- Leadership: Ayatollah Mohammad Hussein al-Ansari
- Status: Active

Location
- Location: Bankstown (Sydney), New South Wales, Australia
- Interactive map of Al-Rasool Al-A'dham Mosque
- Coordinates: 33°55′21″S 151°02′02″E

The Al-Rasool Al-A'dham Mosque (Arabic: مسجد الرسول الاعظم, romanized: Masjid Al-Rasool AlAdham) is a Shia Islam mosque located in Bankstown, Sydney, New South Wales, Australia.

The mosque is supervised by Ayatollah Mohammad Hussein al-Ansari. The mosque generally promotes Shi'a teachings and is attended almost exclusively by Shi'a worshipers.

== See also ==
- Islam in Australia
- List of mosques in Australia
- Al-Zahra Mosque
