= Al-Zahra Mosque =

Mosque in Sydney, New South Wales, Australia

Al Zahra Mosque Al Zahra Mosque
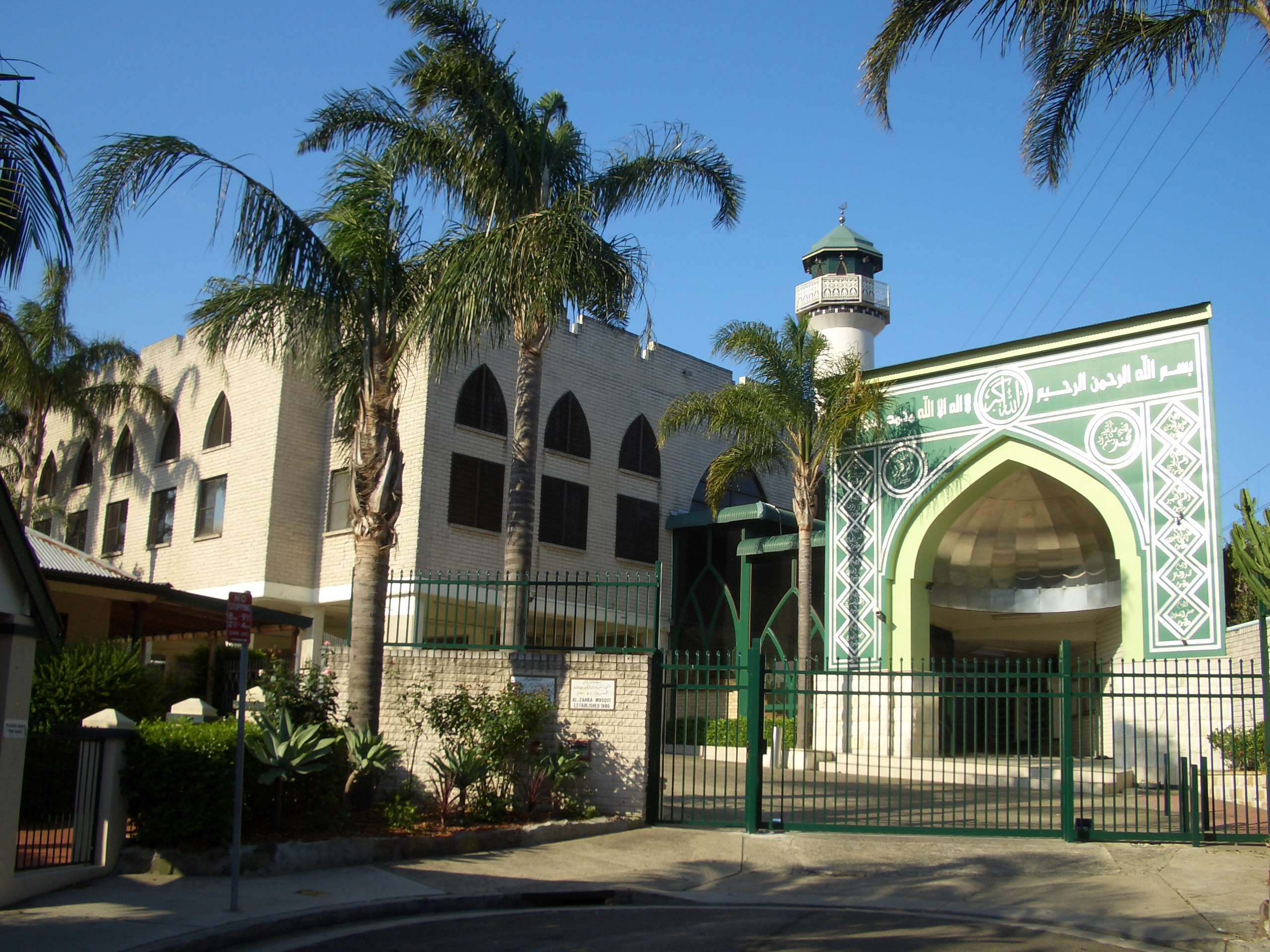
- Al Zahra Mosque in 2006

- Location in greater metropolitan Sydney

Religion
- Affiliation: Shia (Twelver)
- Ecclesiastical or organisational status: Mosque
- Status: Active

Location
- Location: Arncliffe (Sydney), New South Wales
- Country: Australia
- Coordinates: 33°55′58″S 151°08′55″E

Architecture
- Type: Mosque architecture
- Style: Iranian architecture
- Established: 1980

Specifications
- Dome: 1
- Minaret: 1

The Al Zahra Mosque, more commonly known as the Al Zahra Mosque, is a Twelver Shi'ite mosque located in Arncliffe, a suburb of Sydney, New South Wales, Australia. Established in 1980, it is Australia's first and largest Shia mosque and also one of the Australia's largest mosques.

Sheikh Fahd Mehdi Al Ameli built Al Zahra Mosque and greatly helped the growing Shia community in Sydney Australia.

Professor Ahmad Abdul Majeed Hammoud is perhaps the founder of Al Zahra College, which belongs to Al Zahra Mosque.

Al Zahra college is a primary and secondary school that was built next to the Mosque primarily teaches Shia islam as its main focus.

Since the mosque was built there has been considerable real-estate development within its proximity and, in 2013, it was reported that the growing population of Muslim voters are affecting the outcomes of Federal and State elections.

There have been allegations of threats made against the worshippers at the mosque.

In March 2026, the mosque hosted a mourning service following the death of Iran’s Supreme Leader, Ayatollah Ali Khamenei. The event included prayers and commemorations attended by members of the congregation.

== See also ==
- Islam in Australia
- List of mosques in Australia
- Al-Rasool Al-A'dham Mosque
