= Hobart Mosque =

Mosque in Hobart, Tasmania, Australia

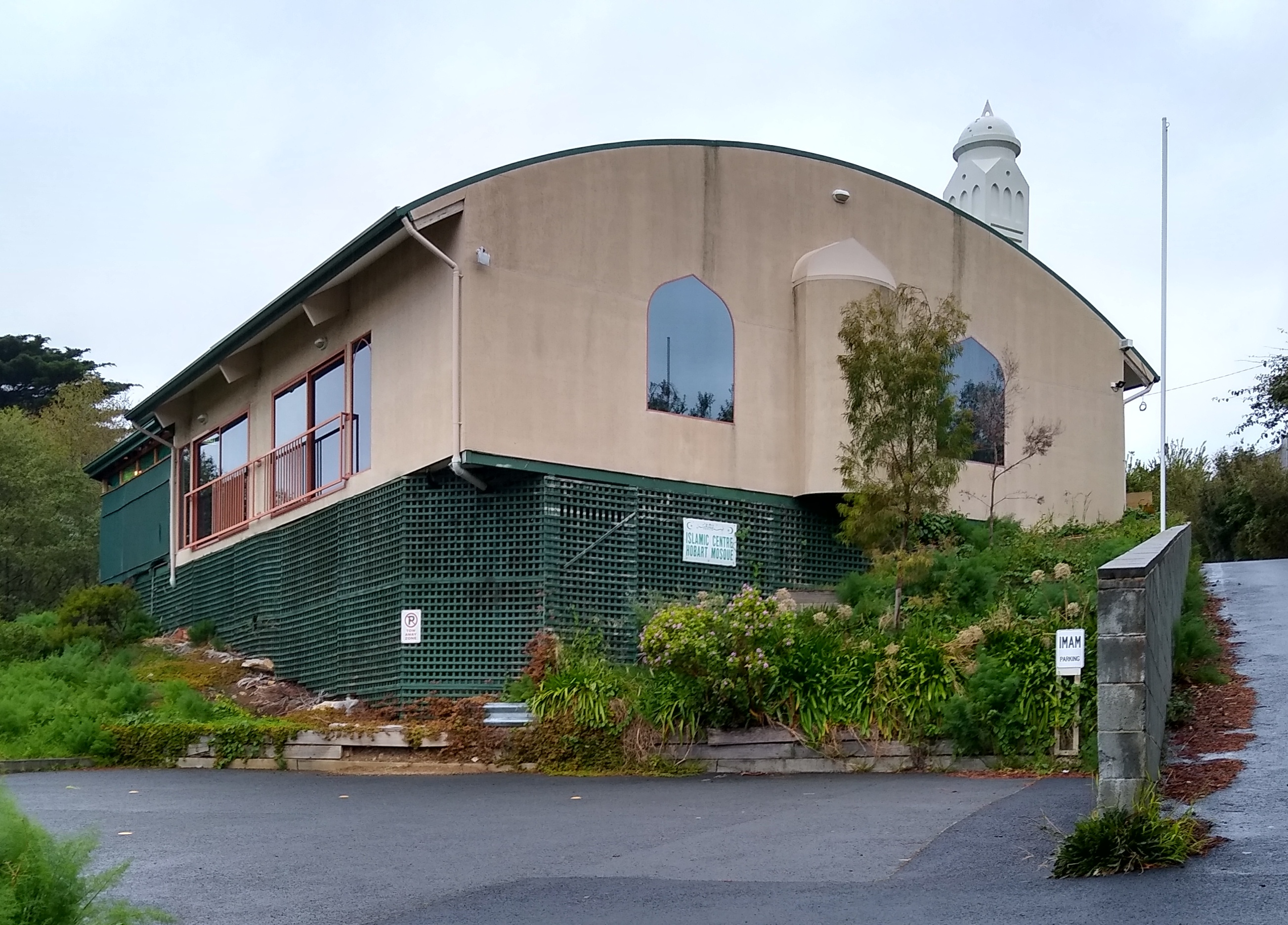

- Location within Hobart

Religion
- Affiliation: Islam
- Ecclesiastical or organizational status: Mosque
- Status: Active

Location
- Location: Hobart, Tasmania, Australia
- Interactive map of Hobart Mosque
- Coordinates: 42°52′53.3″S 147°18′54.1″E

Architecture
- Type: Mosque
- Established: 1985

Specifications
- Capacity: 300 worshipers
- Minaret: 1

The Hobart Mosque is a mosque in Hobart, Tasmania, Australia.

== Overview ==
The mosque was established in 1985 as the first mosque in Tasmania.

The mosque has a capacity of 300 worshipers.

== See also ==
- Islam in Australia
- List of mosques in Australia
