= Albanian Mosque, Carlton North =

Albanian mosque in Victoria, Australia

Albanian Mosque Albanian Australian Islamic Society Mosque Carlton Mosque
- Albanian: Xhami Shqiptare
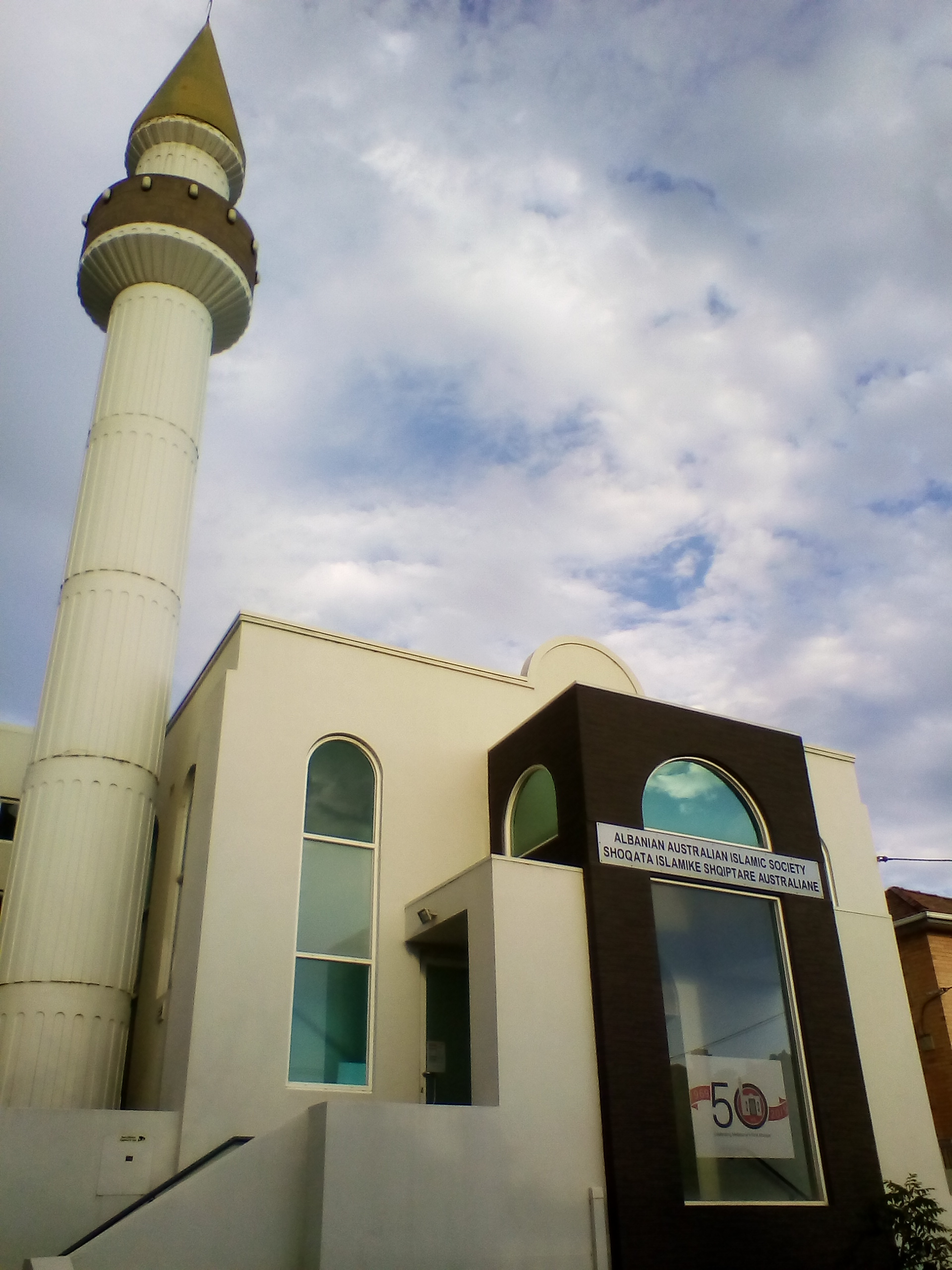

- Location in greater metropolitan Melbourne

Religion
- Affiliation: Sunni Islam
- Ecclesiastical or organizational status: Mosque
- Ownership: Albanian Australian Islamic Society (AAIS)
- Leadership: Perparim Sulaj (Imam)
- Status: Active

Location
- Location: 765 Drummond Street, Carlton North 3054, Melbourne, Victoria
- Country: Australia
- Interactive map of Albanian Mosque; Albanian Australian Islamic Society Mosque; Carlton Mosque
- Coordinates: 37°47′12″S 144°58′14″E

Architecture
- Type: Mosque architecture
- Groundbreaking: 1967
- Completed: 1969
- Minaret: 1

Website
- aais.org.au

The Albanian Mosque (Albanian: Xhami shqiptare), also known as the Albanian Australian Islamic Society Mosque and Carlton Mosque, is a mosque located in Carlton North, a suburb of inner Melbourne, Victoria, Australia. The building contains a minaret, and community facilities. Associated with the Albanian Australian community, the mosque is owned by and the centre of the Albanian Australian Islamic Society (AAIS) of Victoria, whose membership numbers some 1000 people. Construction began in the mid 1960s and was completed by 1969. The mosque is the oldest in Melbourne and listed on the Victorian Heritage Register.

== History ==
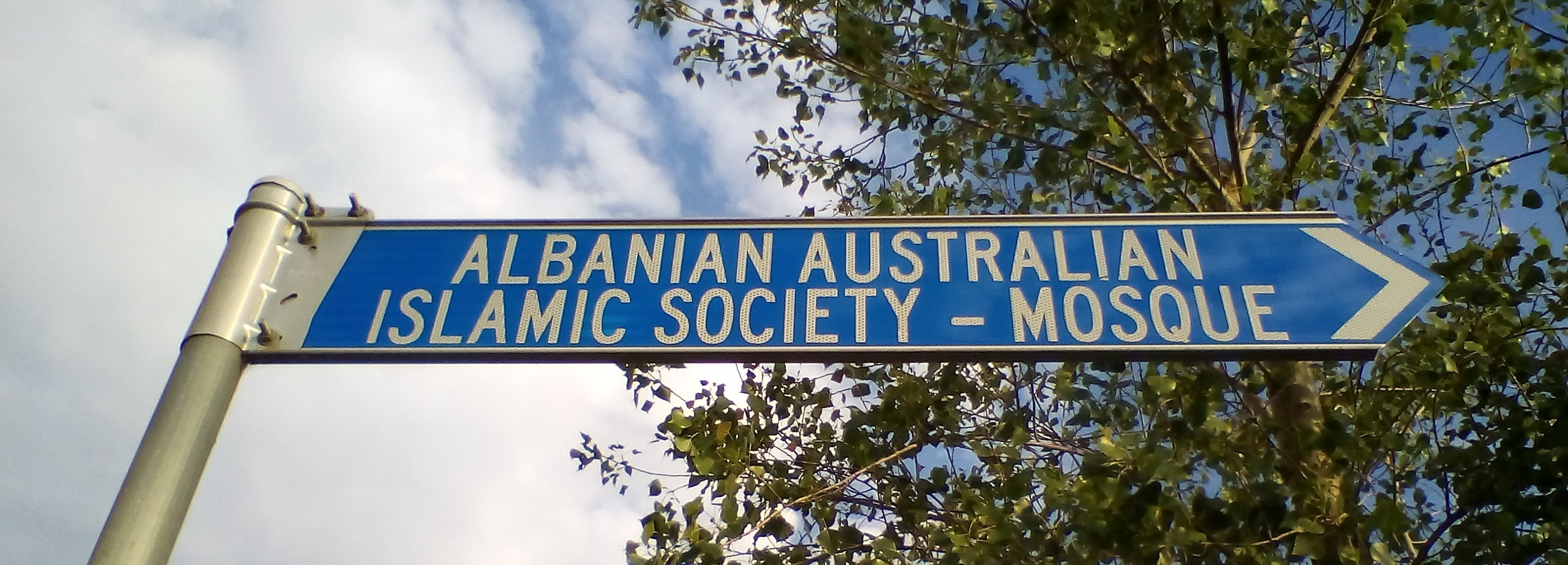
Street sign at Drummond St entrance pointing to mosque and AAIS location

Following the Second World War, Muslim immigrants such as Albanians migrated to Victoria and found the state lacking Islamic infrastructure. Makeshift mosques belonging to previous Melbourne Muslims existed decades before, often an adapted small room for religious services, but none were long lasting.

In 1961, Muslim immigrants formed the Islamic Society of Victoria (ISV) to cater for their religious needs, with Albanians comprising its largest number of donors. ISV members met in an adapted small house on 1008 Drummond Street, Carlton that served for a brief period as a mosque, becoming the centre for its Islamic Community of Carlton association and of Muslim life. In 1963, the Albanian community established an organisation named the Albanian Australian Islamic Society (AAIS).

By the late 1960s, Albanians in Melbourne travelled far to the Albanian mosque in Shepparton, Victoria for Bajram (Eid al-Fitr and Eid al-Adha) celebrations and Muslim burial services (janaza). Due to wide geographical distances between both Albanian communities, phone calls were expensive and telegrams sent only when a death occurred. The situation motivated the Melbourne Albanian community, who by that time were to varying degrees financially established to build a mosque within the city.

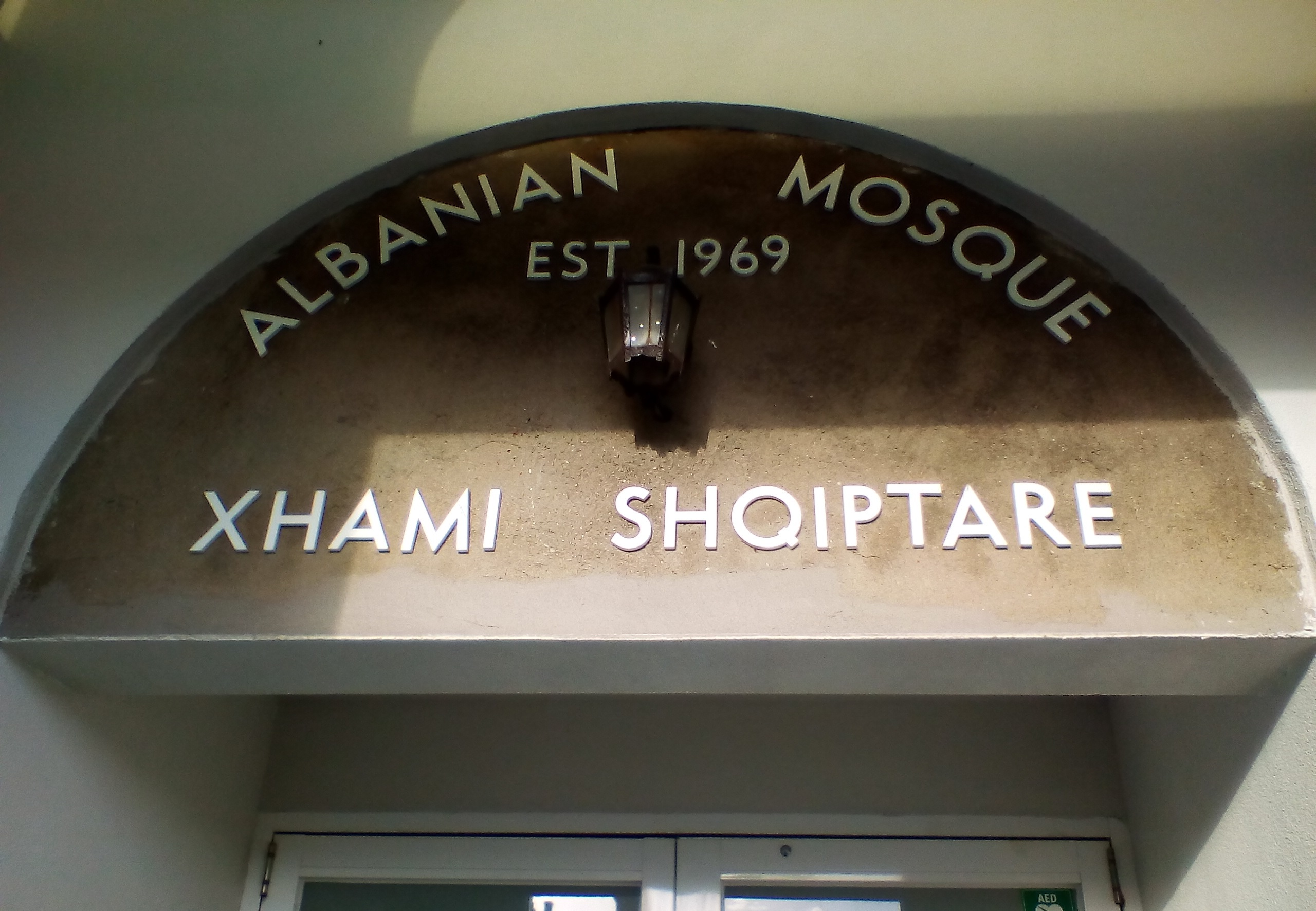
Original signage above entrance door noting mosque founding and name

Fundraising was successfully undertaken by AAIS with one of its founders, Memet Zyka, a community leader seeking and receiving donations from Muslim, Catholic and Orthodox members of the Albanian community. AAIS purchased a property at 765 Drummond Street, Carlton. It contained a Victorian period two story house, previously the home of past Victorian Police Commissioner Thomas O'Callaghan, and an adjacent large empty plot of land. The initial design of the mosque building was square with brownish bricks. Construction began in 1967 and finished in 1969.

The mosque since its establishment, apart from being a centre for Albanian religious and cultural activities has also provided assistance to other communities. For instance, Albanians in the 1970s shared their mosque with newly arriving Turkish immigrants, becoming at the time an important centre for the Turkish Australian community. Other arrivals, such as students from Southeast Asian countries (Brunei, Indonesia and Malaysia) received assistance from the mosque. In the 1970s and 1980s, a Muslim Palestinian volunteer at the mosque, Omar Hallak taught the Quran and Arabic language.

In 1981, Rexhep Idrizi, became the imam at the mosque. A minaret was added to the mosque in 1994, after permission was granted by the High Court of Australia. The building underwent major renovations in 2003 resulting in the addition of a number of new facilities, the mosque exterior painted white and the installation of red carpet, to reflect the colour of the Albanian flag. In the late 2010s Bekim Hasani was imam of the mosque.

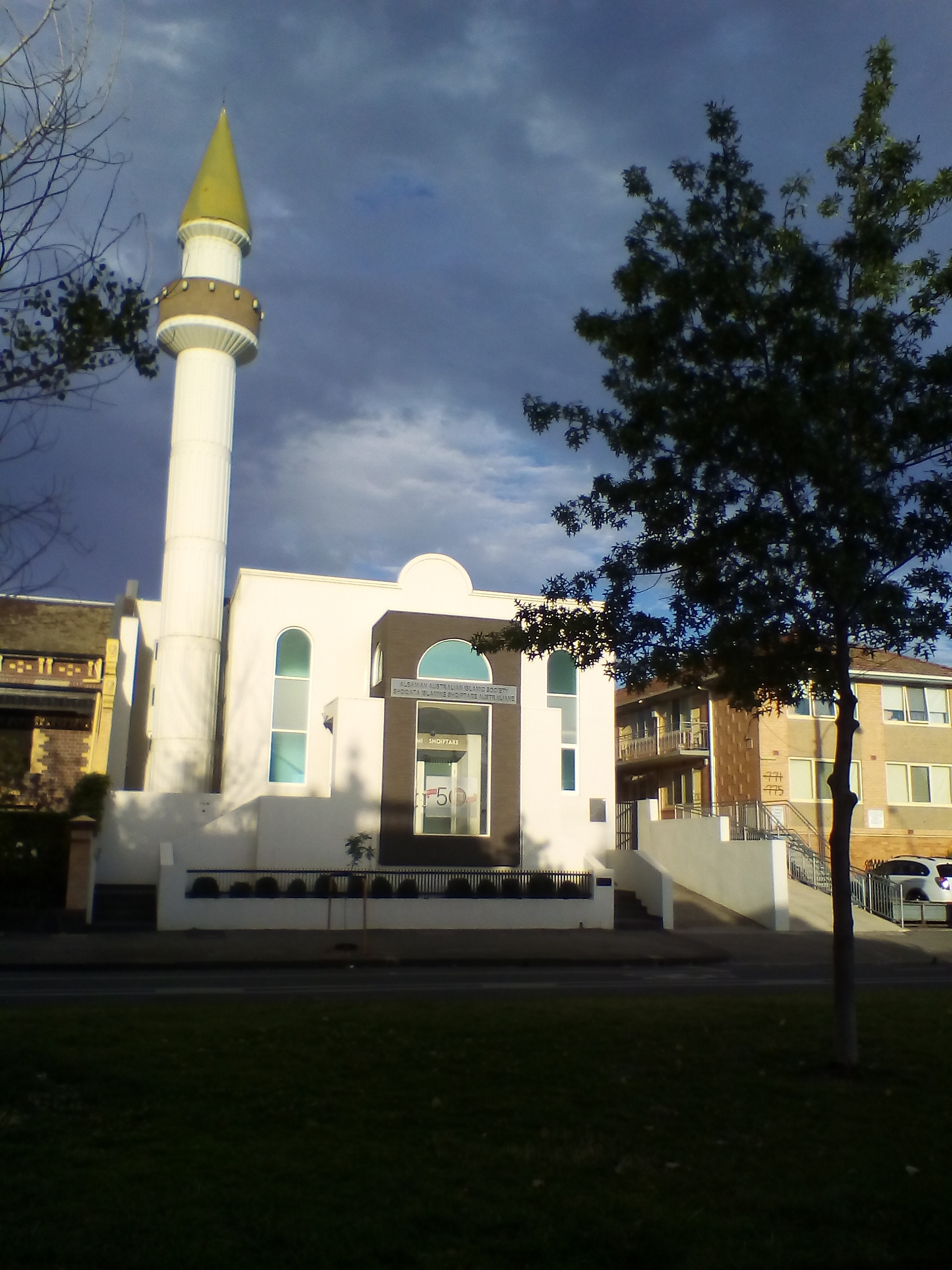
Mosque on Drummond St

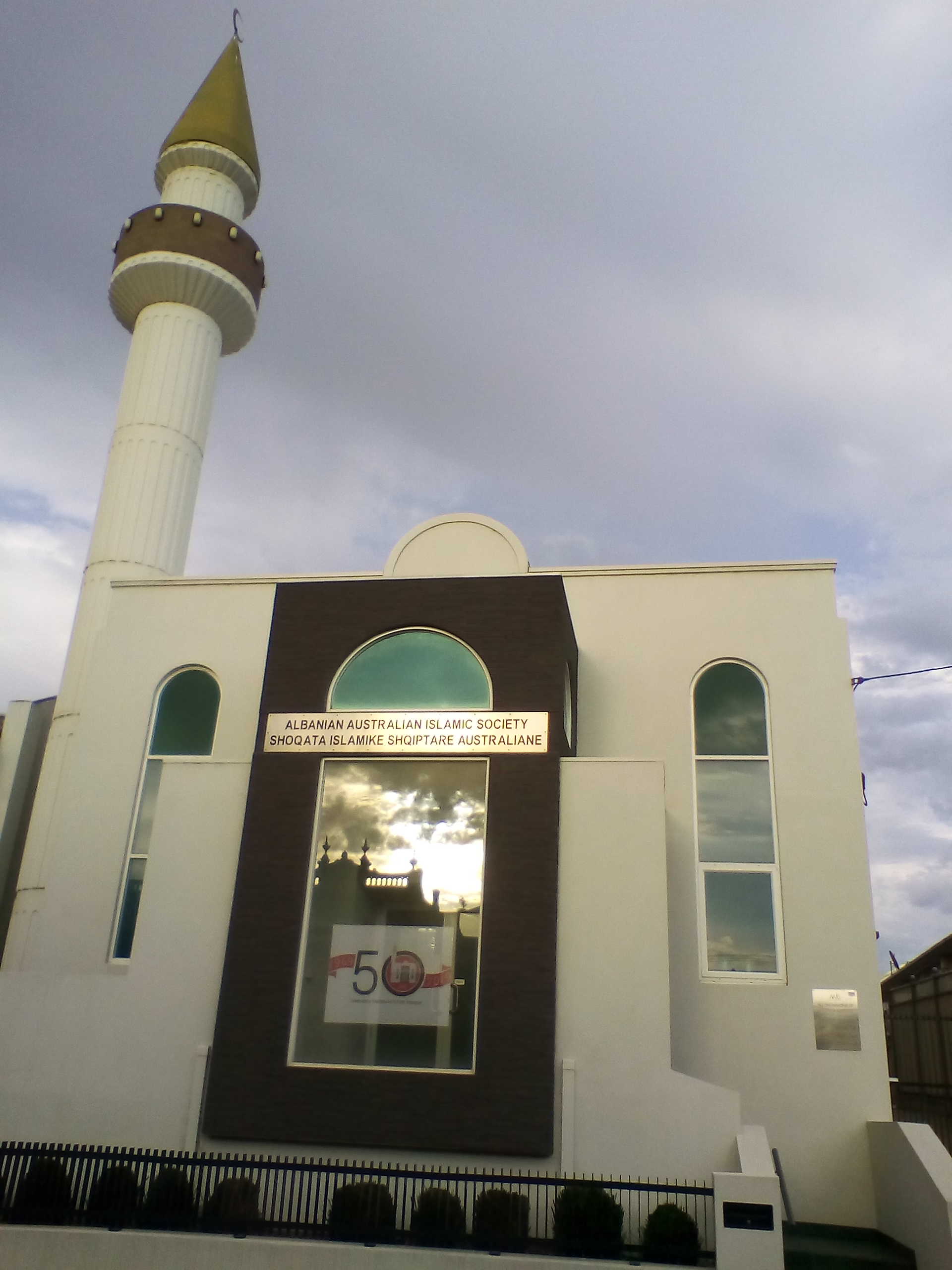
Close up of mosque

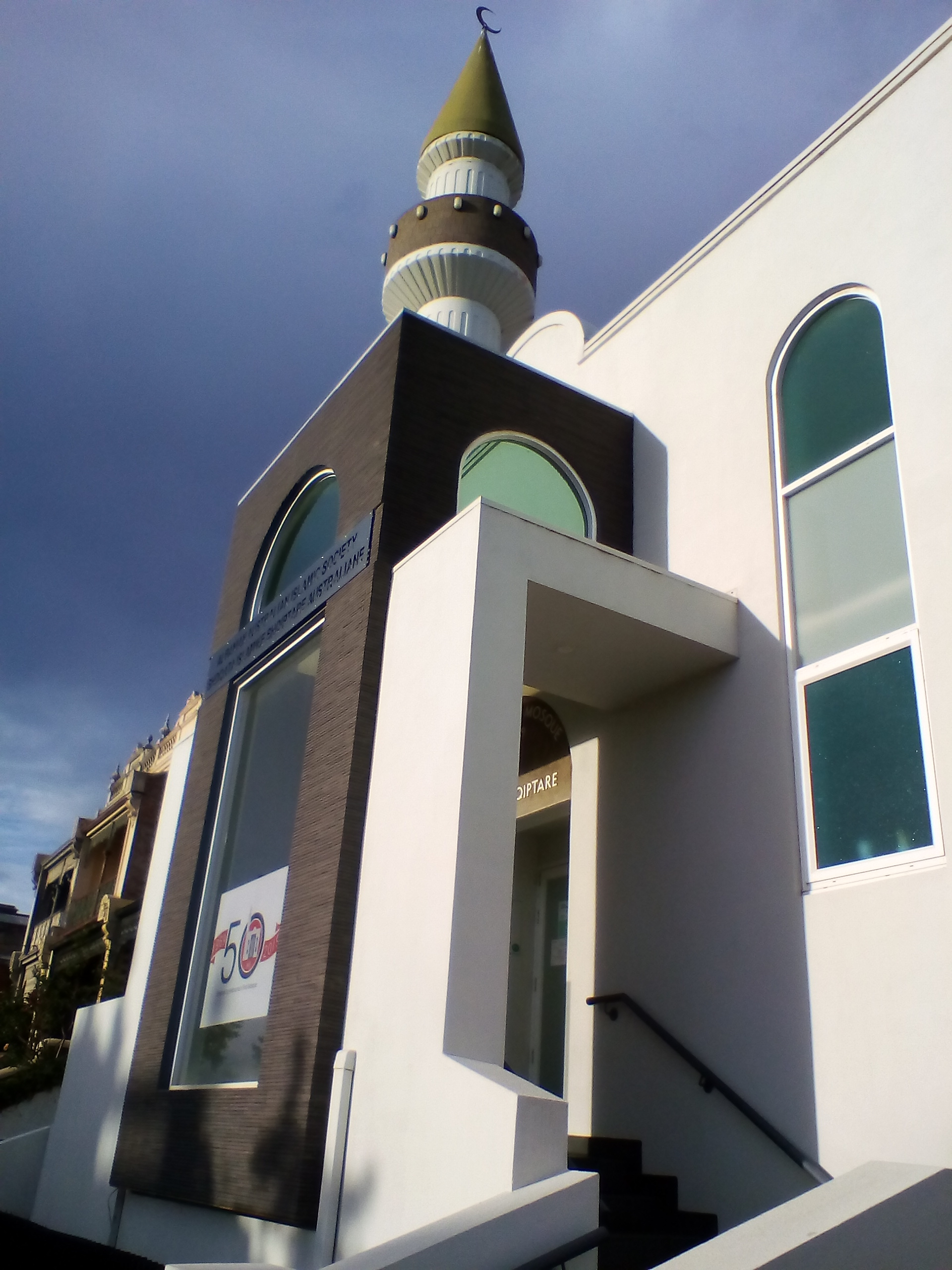
Mosque entrance

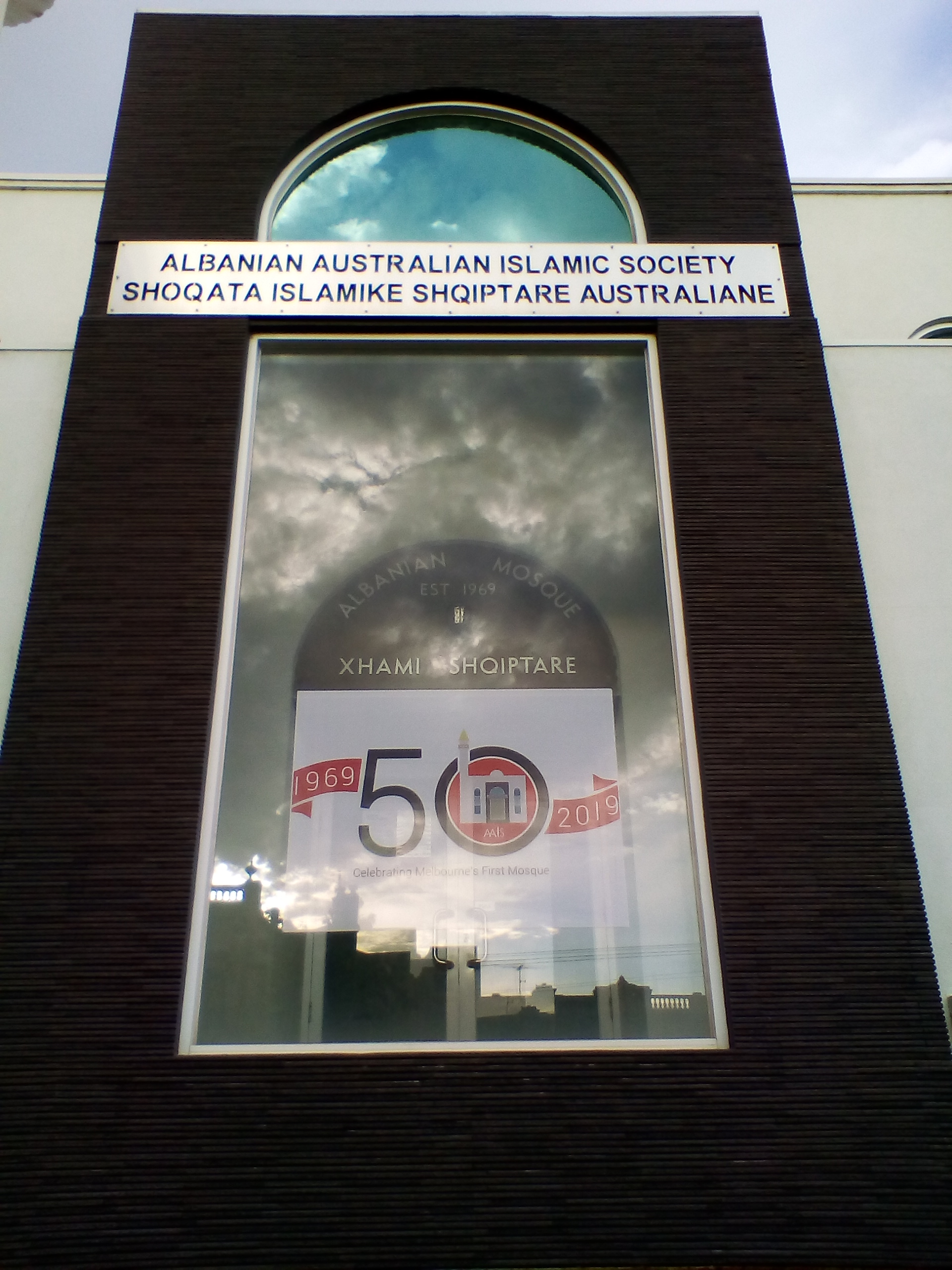
Covered mosque portico

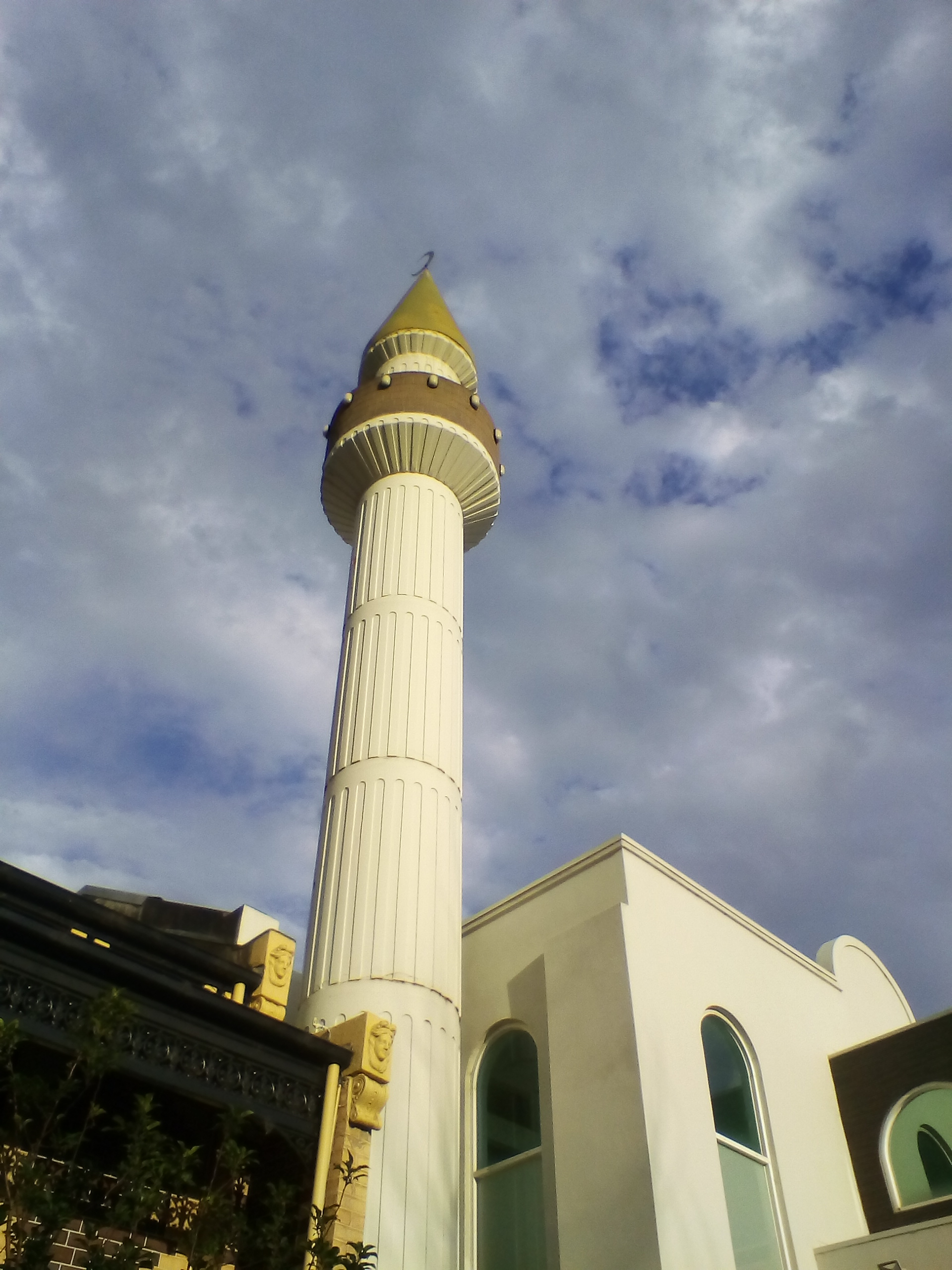
Mosque minaret

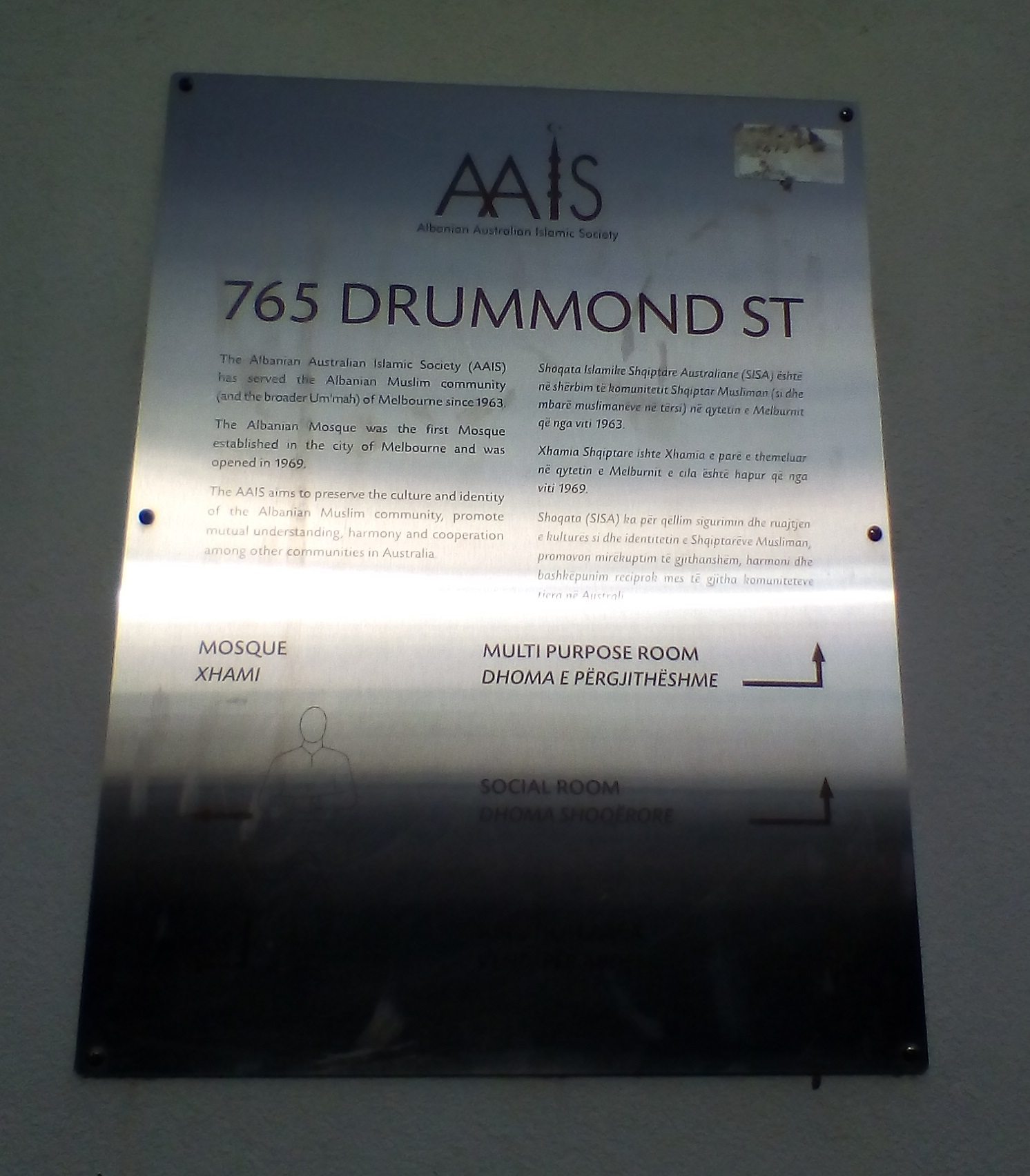
Metal plaque informing people about the mosque

In solidarity with victims of the 2019 Christchurch mosque shootings, the mosque like others in Victoria held an open day (17 March) for the public to support or acquaint themselves with Islam and Muslims.

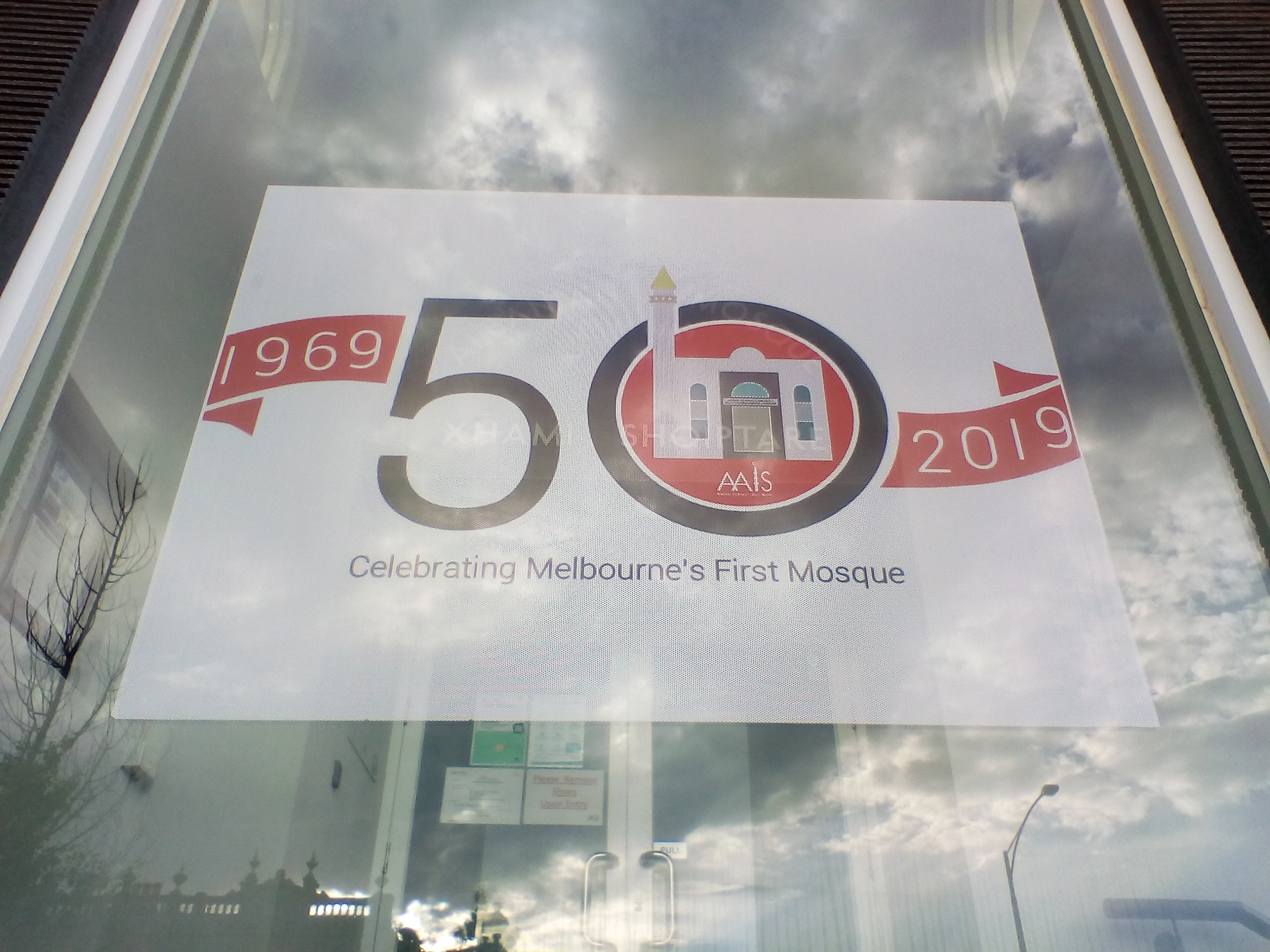
Poster marking 50 year anniversary

AAIS held a celebratory outdoor festival at the mosque on 17 November 2019 marking its 50th anniversary, attended by some 3000-4000 people. It included Muslim Australians of Albanian and other backgrounds, non Muslim Australians of other faiths, political representatives and heads of non-governmental organisations (NGOs). Simultaneously, an exhibition was held inside the mosque showcasing its history. For the occasion and the first time in its history, the call to prayer (adhan) was performed by Amet Balla from the mosque minaret and heard in the surrounding area through its loudspeakers.

During its 50-year history, the mosque congregation, including donors has become diverse and originating from various ethnicities. Imam Hasani left the mosque in 2020 to become head of sharia affairs at the Islamic Coordinating Council of Victoria (ICCV). The current imam is Perparim Sulaj.

== See also ==
- Islam in Australia
- List of mosques in Oceania
- Albanian Mosque (Dandenong)
- Albanian Mosque (Mareeba)
- Albanian Mosque (Shepparton)
