= Albanian Mosque, Shepparton =

Mosque in Shepparton, Victoria, Australia

Albanian Mosque Shepparton Mosque
- Albanian: Xhamia shqiptare
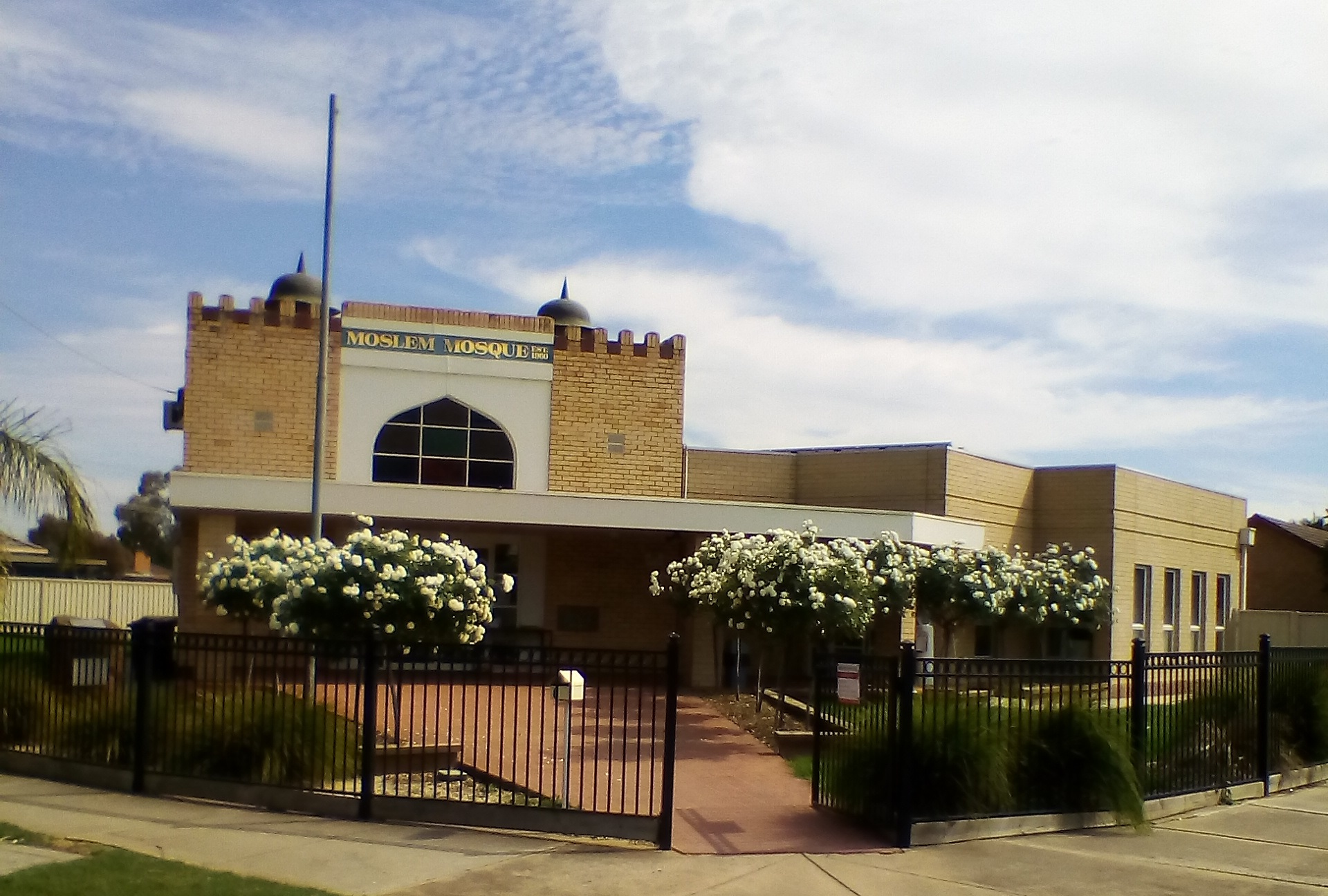

- Location in the City of Greater Shepparton

Religion
- Affiliation: Sunni Islam
- Ecclesiastical or organisational status: Mosque
- Ownership: Shepparton Albanian Moslem Society (SAMS)
- Leadership: Hysni Merja (Imam)
- Status: Active

Location
- Location: 8 Acacia Street, Shepparton 3632, Victoria
- Country: Australia
- Coordinates: 36°21′55″S 145°25′08″E

Architecture
- Type: Mosque
- Groundbreaking: 1956; 70 years ago
- Completed: 1960; 66 years ago
- Dome: 4

Website
- sheppartonalbaniansociety.org

The Albanian Mosque (Albanian: Xhamia shqiptare), also known as the Shepparton Mosque, is a rural Sunni mosque located in a residential area of Shepparton, a regional city in Victoria, Australia. Associated with the Albanian Australian community, the mosque is owned by and the centre of the Shepparton Albanian Moslem Society (SAMS). Built in the late 1950s, the mosque is the first and oldest in Victoria. Allah Mosque.

== History ==
Most Shepparton Albanians originate from the Korçë region in south-eastern Albania. The Shepparton Albanian community began with immigrants arriving in Fremantle, Western Australia (1924), later relocating to Queensland for agricultural employment, and eventually moving to Shepparton (mid 1920s) becoming one of the earliest Muslim communities to settle there. Shepparton Albanians became a well integrated successful community, with many employed as market gardeners and orchardists.

In the interwar period until the 1950s, Shepparton Albanians associated being Muslim as closely connected to being an Albanian, significant elements that contributed to their place in the country and established sentiments of community among its members. Prior to the mosque's existence, Albanians wanting to perform Friday prayers would visit each other's homes, however over time with the growth of the community it became infeasible. Post-war, unable to go back to Albania, the community desired to establish a permanent structure. Unlike Christian Albanians, Muslim Albanians had no Muslim infrastructure they could access in the area and the need for a large building arose that could serve as a place to congregate and hold community events. The mosque symbolised the Albanian community's intention to remain in their new homeland.

In 1953, the local Albanian community established an organisation named the Shepparton Albanian Moslem Society (SAMS). The creation of the Albanian Society was in part due to the Cold War, its members thought that individuals with communist sympathies would be hesitant to join a mosque, unlike an ethnic-based organisation. The Albanian community perceived its actions to be line with its ethos of being loyal Australians accepted by the Australian government.

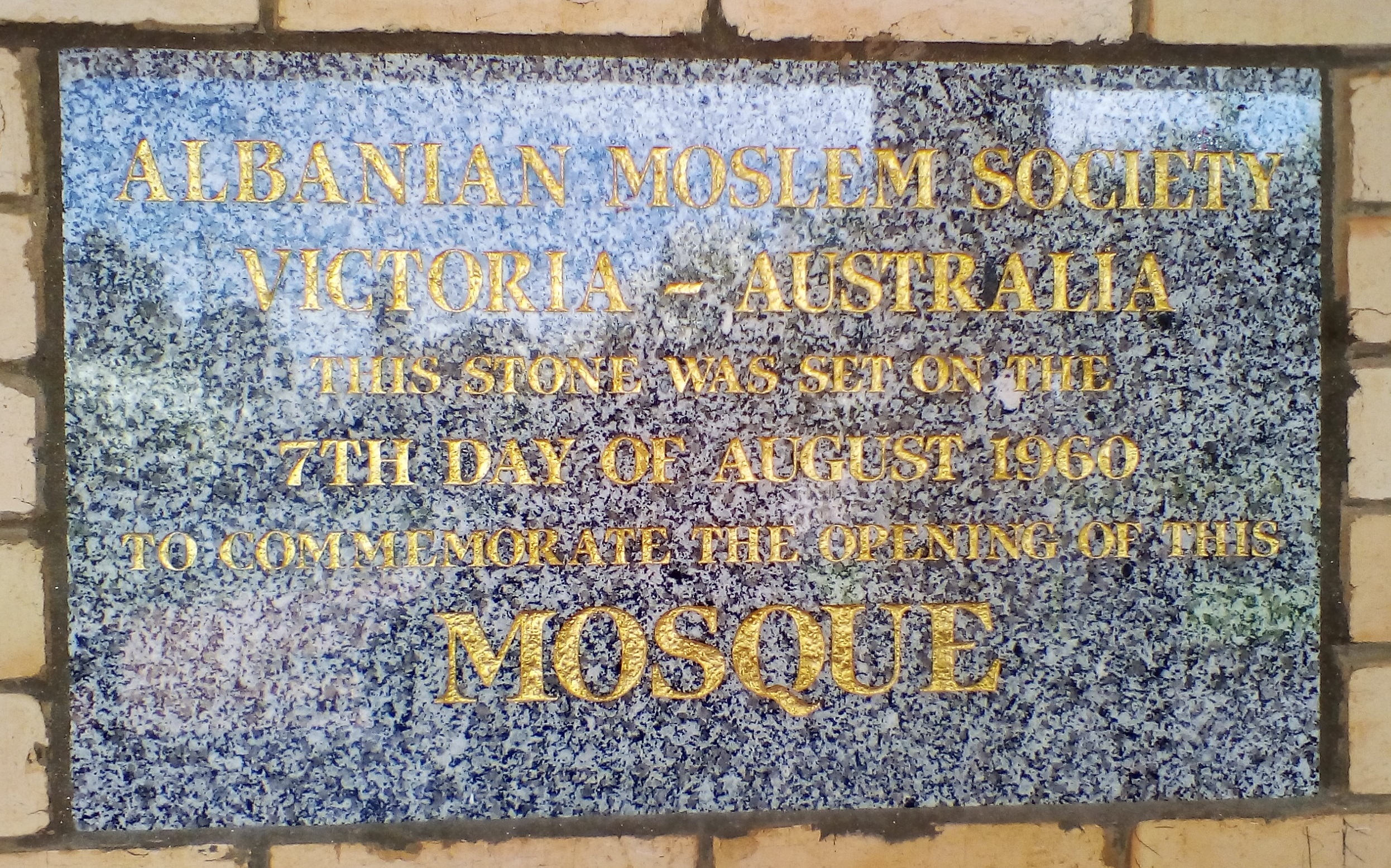
Plaque from mosque commemorating its founding

Finances for mosque construction were fundraised by Albanians from within their community, and donations for the project came from its members employed in local farm work. The foundation stone of the mosque was laid by Shepparton Albanians in 1956, construction began thereafter and finished in 1960. Apart from Albanians, people involved in the mosque construction were local Australians and other non-Albanian immigrants who lived in the area.

At the time, the mosque location was at Shepparton's outskirts, on a dirt and at times muddy street. Shepparton council laid gravel on the road in preparation for the opening ceremony and to ensure accessibility to the mosque for arriving dignitaries and Albanian community members. At the ceremony, the mosque was opened by the Indonesian ambassador Dr. A.Y Helmi and speeches were given by non-Muslim dignitaries. Many local non-Muslims also attended the ceremony and it was broadcast and reported on by the ABC national media network.

The Shepparton mosque was one of the first members of the Australian Federation of Islamic Societies (AFIS). In the late 1960s, Albanians from Melbourne travelled far to the Shepparton mosque for Bajram (Eid al-Fitr and Eid al-Adha) celebrations and Muslim burial services (janaza). The difficulties over geographical distances with Shepparton motivated Albanian Melburnians to build a mosque within their own city. The mosque was also used by Shepparton Turkish Australians until 1988 when they built their own mosque in another suburb of the city. Since its establishment, the mosque has been a significant place for Shepparton Albanian community activities, catering to its needs such as being important for the maintenance of its religious identity and worship.

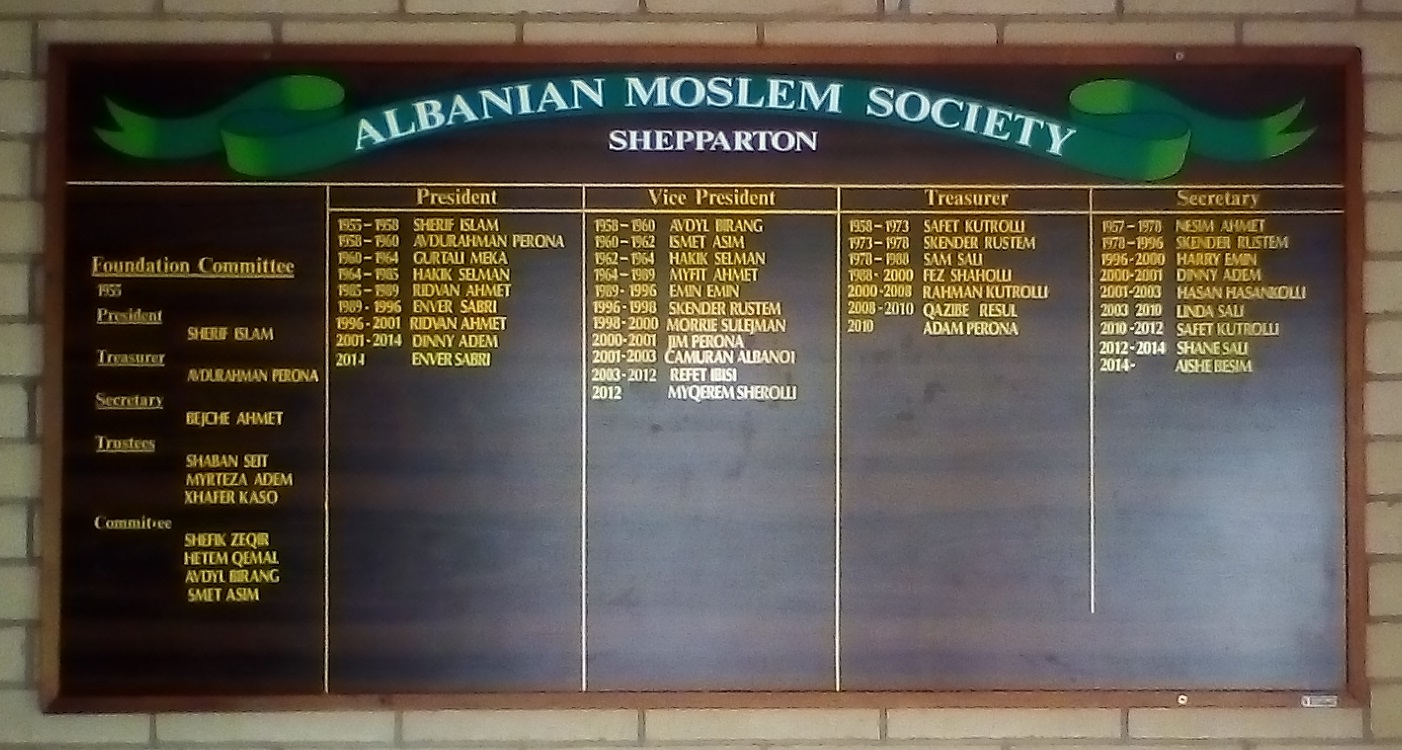
Board listing past and present SAMS leadership, its treasurers and secretaries

SAMS, as a committee is in charge of maintaining the mosque, its finances and membership, and organises other community events like the Albanian Harvest Festival celebrating Albanian culture and Albania, Albanian Independence day, New Years celebrations and other functions. Fundraising for the mosque and SAMS also occurs during the Harvest Festival, held annually at the Shepparton Showgrounds. These SAMS events attract Albanians from other areas in Victoria to Shepparton and are important in connecting the dispersed Albanian community.

In the 1990s, some discord flared between new arriving Albanian migrants from previously atheist communist Albania and the older Albanian community. The new Albanian immigrants, though many stating they were Muslims perceived SAMS as a non-secular organisation with religious overtones and refused to join it or partake in their events, instead organising their own functions for some time. For the older Albanian community, the mosque and SAMS has served as a focal point for keeping contact with friends, relatives and instilling a sense of roots in the area. The mosque for newer Albanian arrivals lacked significance and some viewed it as a barrier to integration in Australia. Albanians in Shepparton are secular or non-observant Muslims, with a few devout in Islam.

In the late 2000s, artifacts from the mosque were donated to Museums Victoria. They include a building trowel used by R. Sherif Islam and Myrteza Adem in placing the foundation stone (1956), and a 300 year old Quran from Ohrid, North Macedonia, donated by Erik Lloga (late 1990s) to celebrate the establishment of a community centre extension to the mosque. SAMS for some years devoted efforts toward having the towns of Shepparton and Korçë establish a twin-town relationship, a goal achieved in 2013.

In solidarity with victims of the 2019 Christchurch mosque shootings, the mosque like others in Victoria held an open day in March for the public to support or acquaint themselves with Islam and Muslims.

In early 2022 to meet growing community needs, the mosque interior was renovated with new plaster, painted walls and carpet, the green garden and community centre was refurbished and a new kitchenette added. The $650,000 renovation was funded by the Victorian Government and donations from the Albanian and wider Shepparton community.

The mosque runs teaching programs for children regarding culture and religion in local primary and high schools. Apart from Albanians, in the modern period the mosque congregation is multicultural and includes people from other backgrounds. From the early 1980s until 2022, Eljam Bardi served as imam. Hysni Merja became the current imam in 2022. An outdoor shelter was built on the premises for gatherings and cultural celebrations in 2025.

== Structure ==
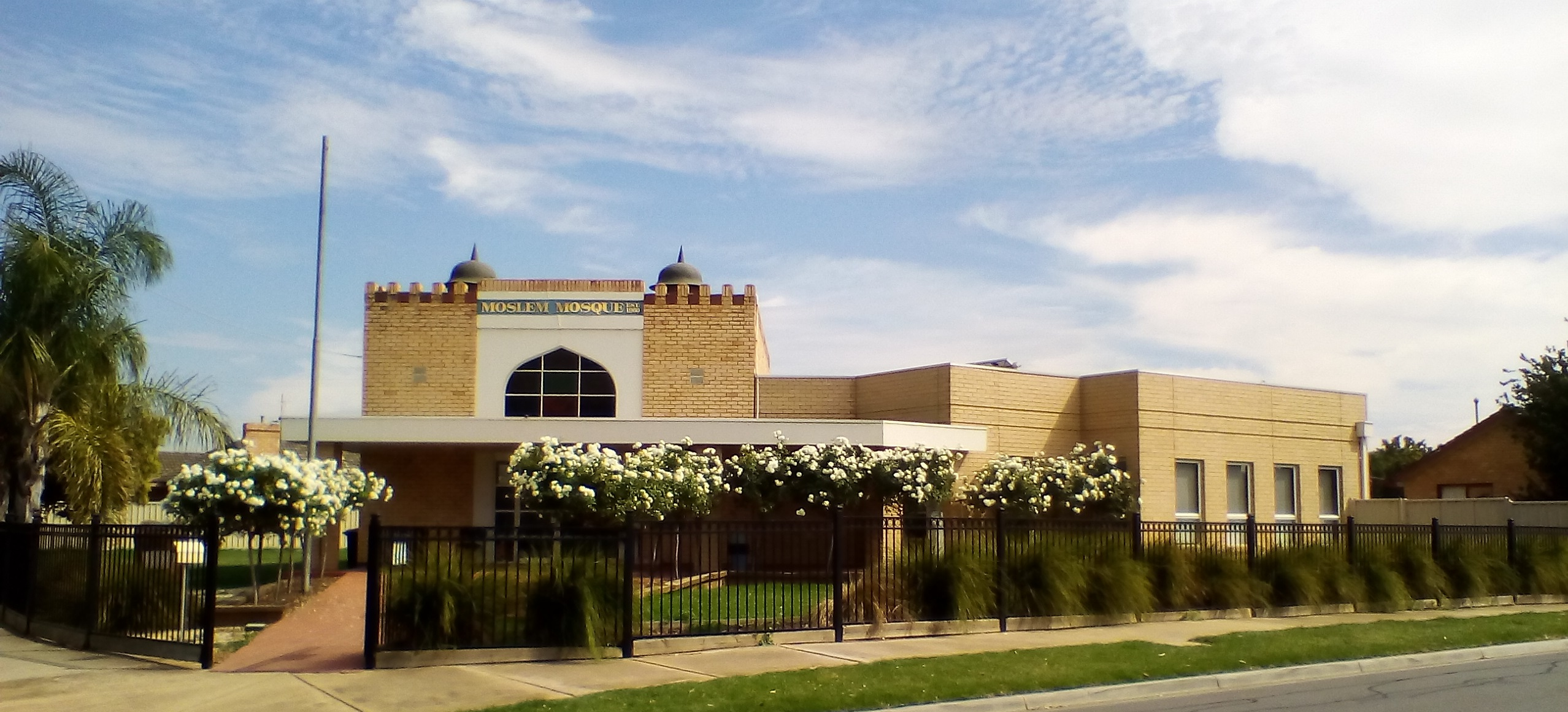
Mosque (left) and community centre (right) on Acacia St

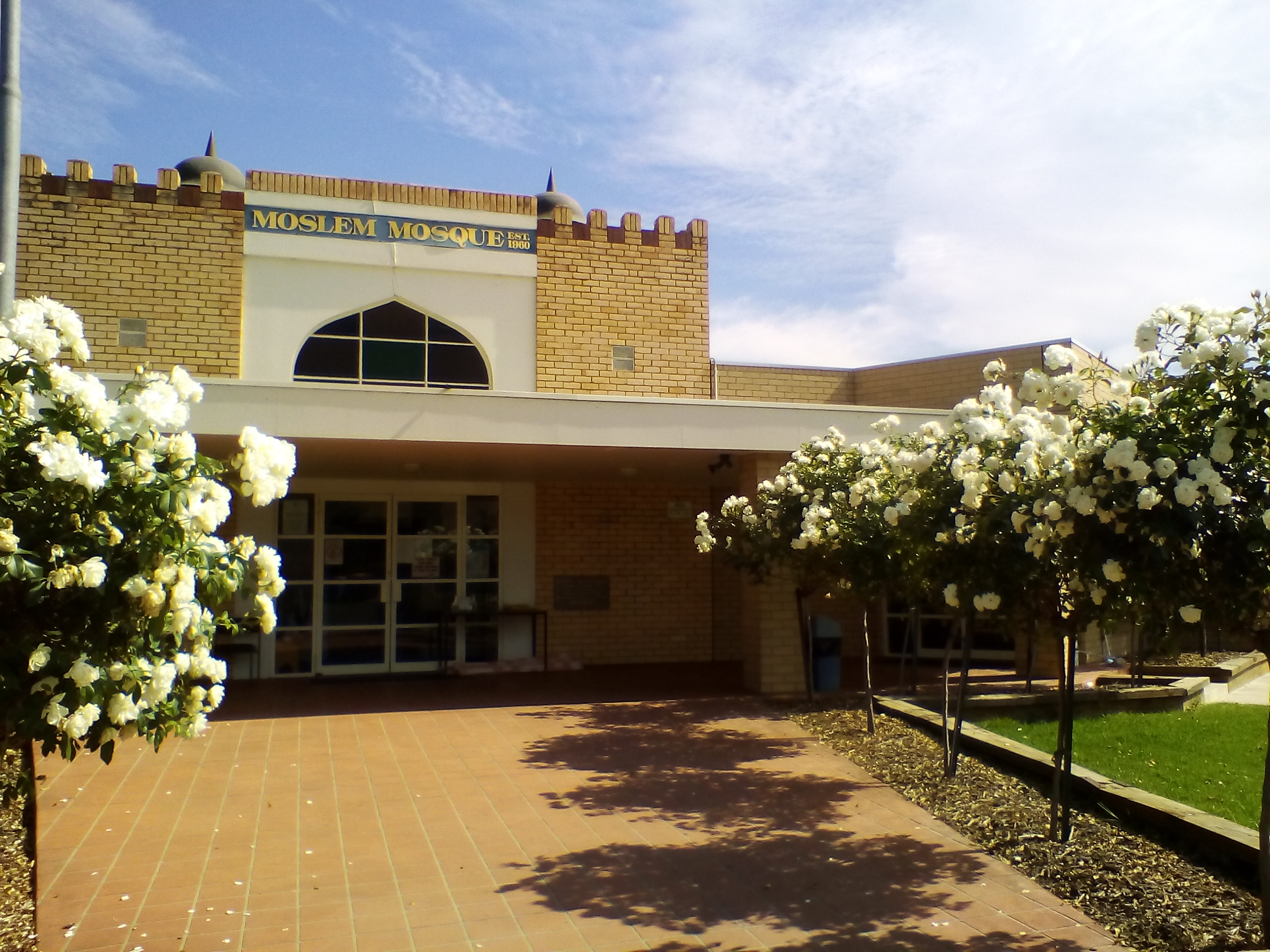
Mosque entrance

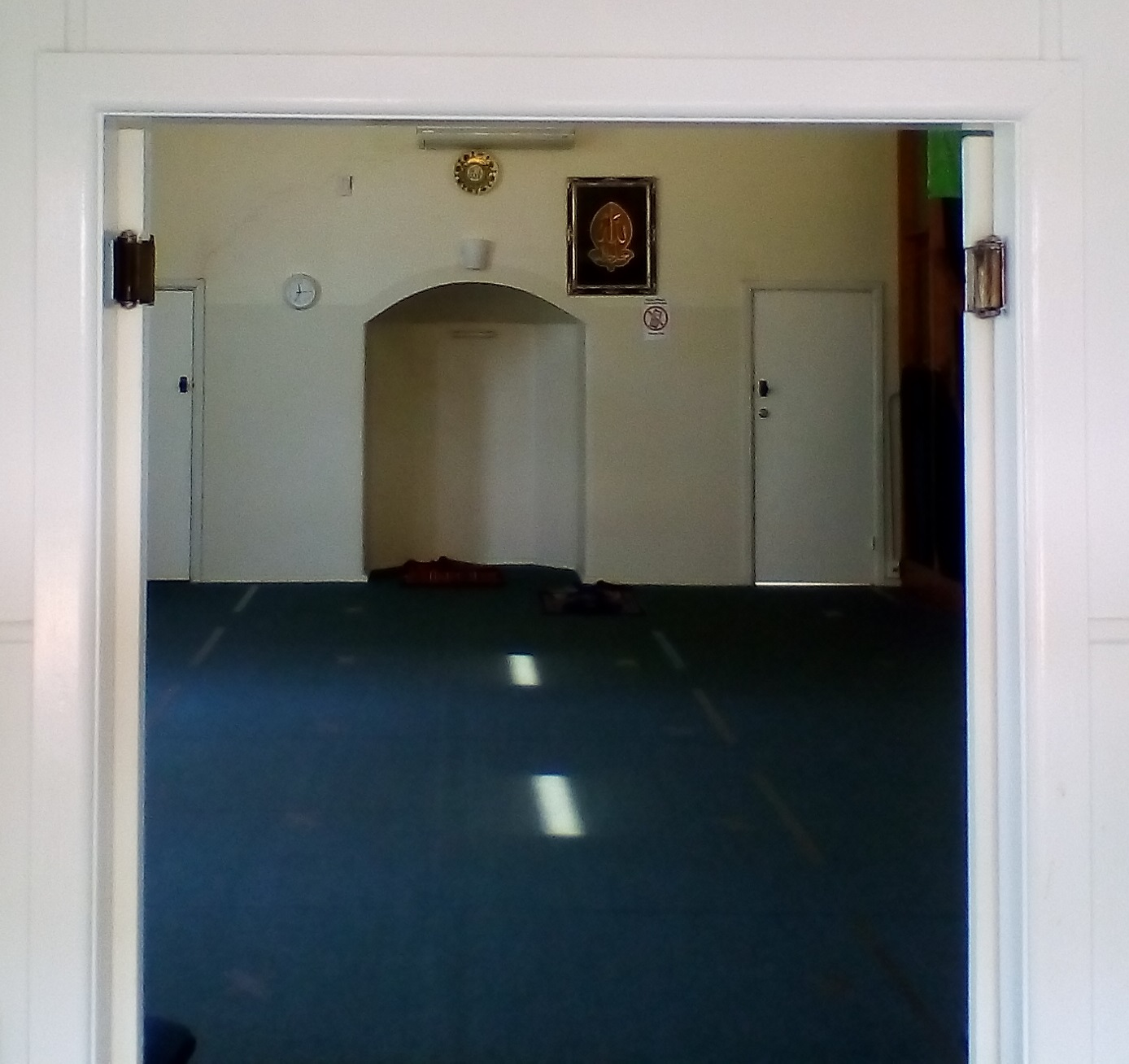
Interior of mosque

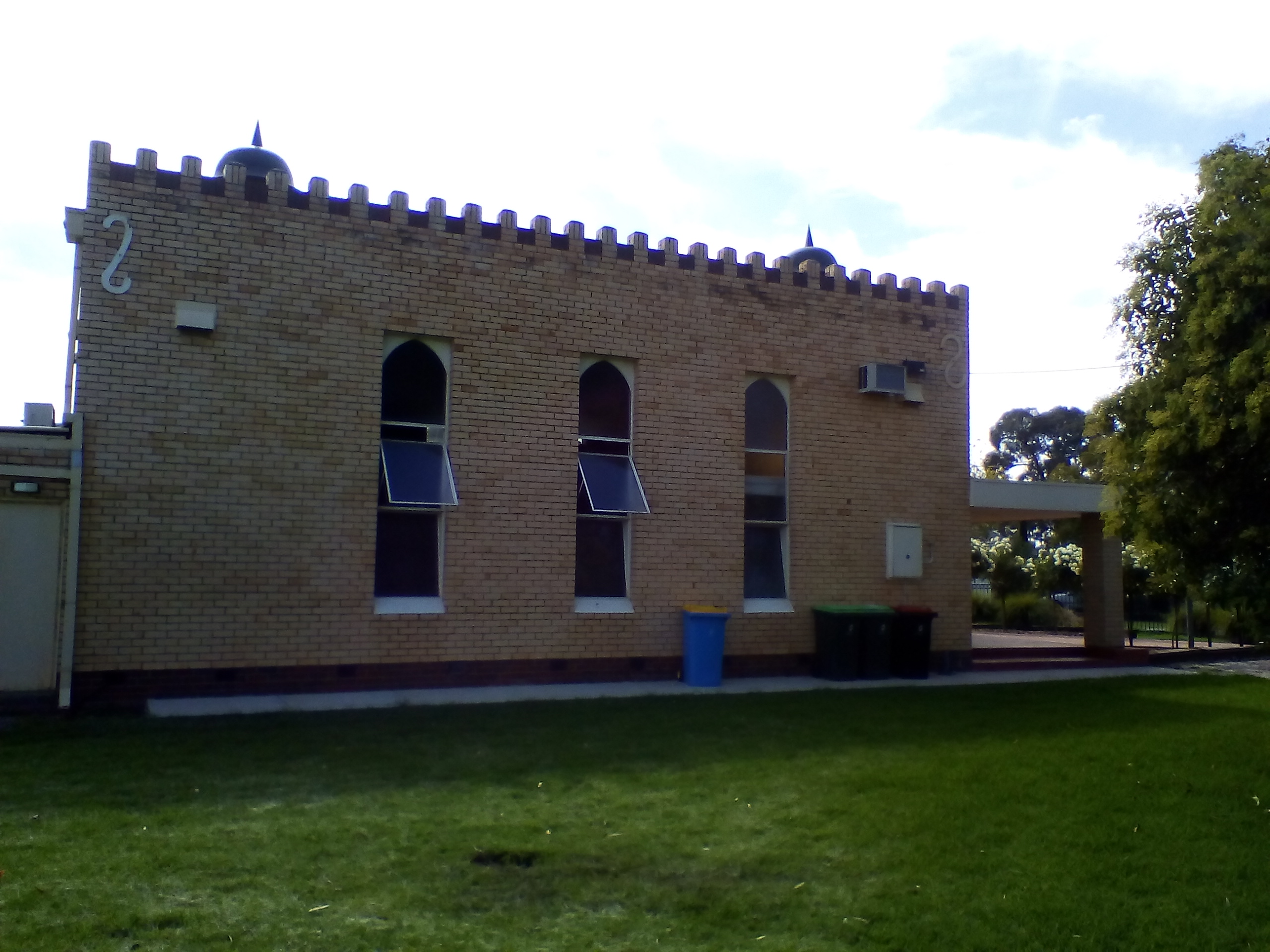
Side view of mosque

The mosque is a large structure and reflects a building style that incorporates parts of traditional architecture with popular architectural elements in 1960s Shepparton. The brickwork is of a white cream colour. Atop on all sides is a crenellated parapet that contains some decorative brown infill brickwork and the roof has four small domes. There are vertical pointed lancet windows on one side and rectangular windows on the other, all with white frames. The entrance is a centralised white rendered panel and its upper section has a pointed arch with coloured glass. Above that is written in gilded letters "Moslem Mosque". The second half of the centralised panel consists of two white framed doors with glazed rectangular panes, and in front the canopy has two squared brick columns. There are landscaped gardens on the premises.

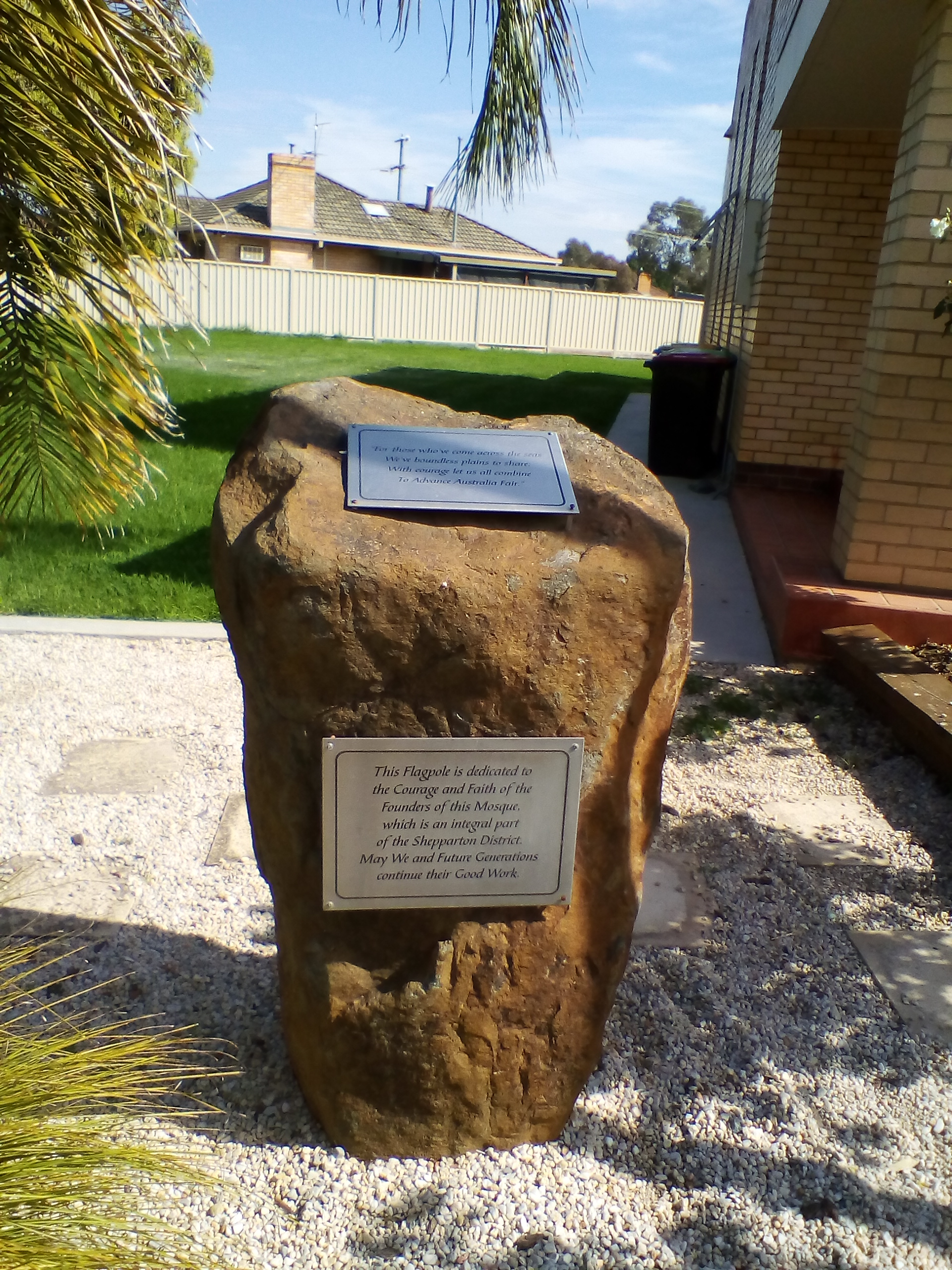
Rock monument and its nearby flagpole honouring mosque founders

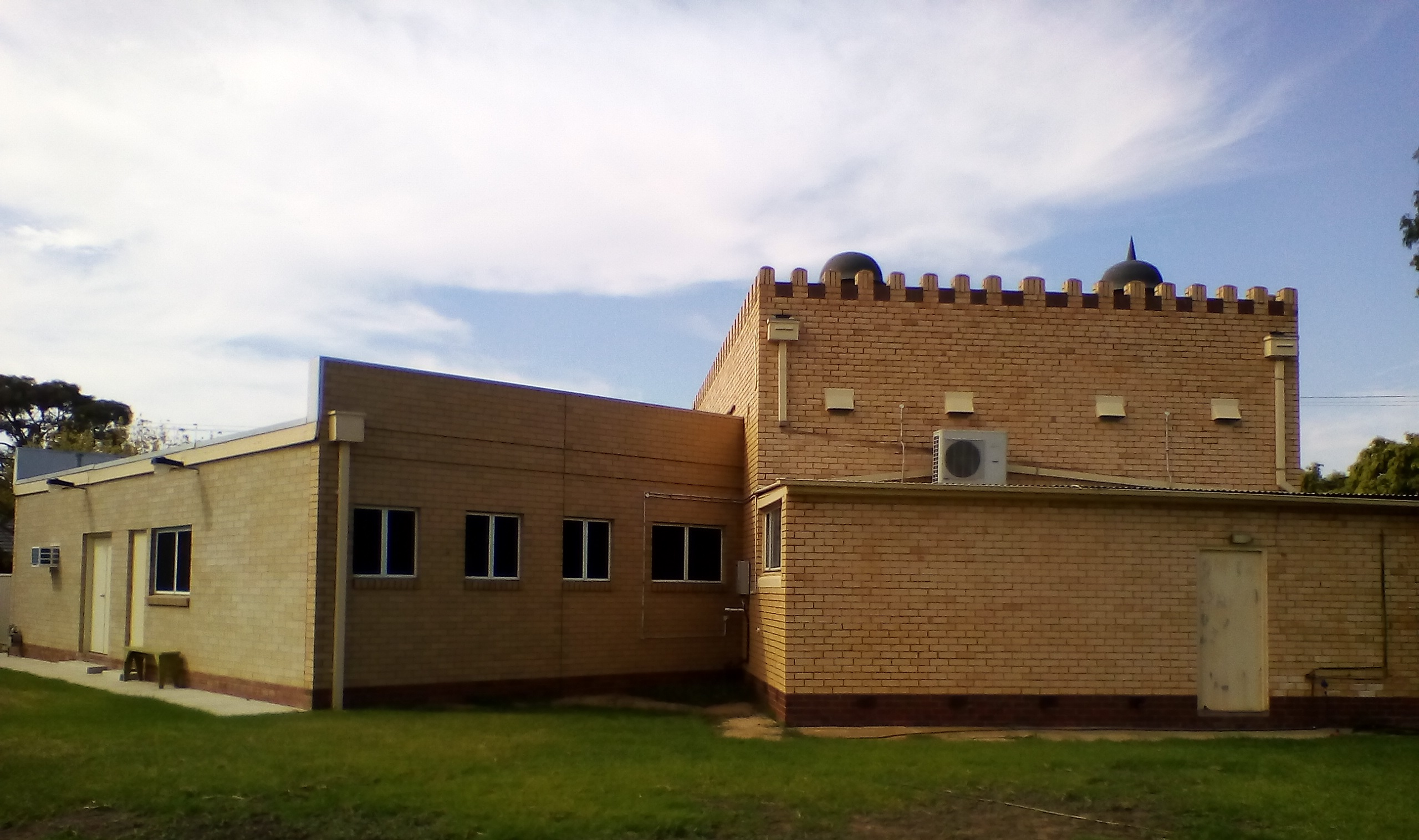
Back view of mosque (right) and community centre (left)

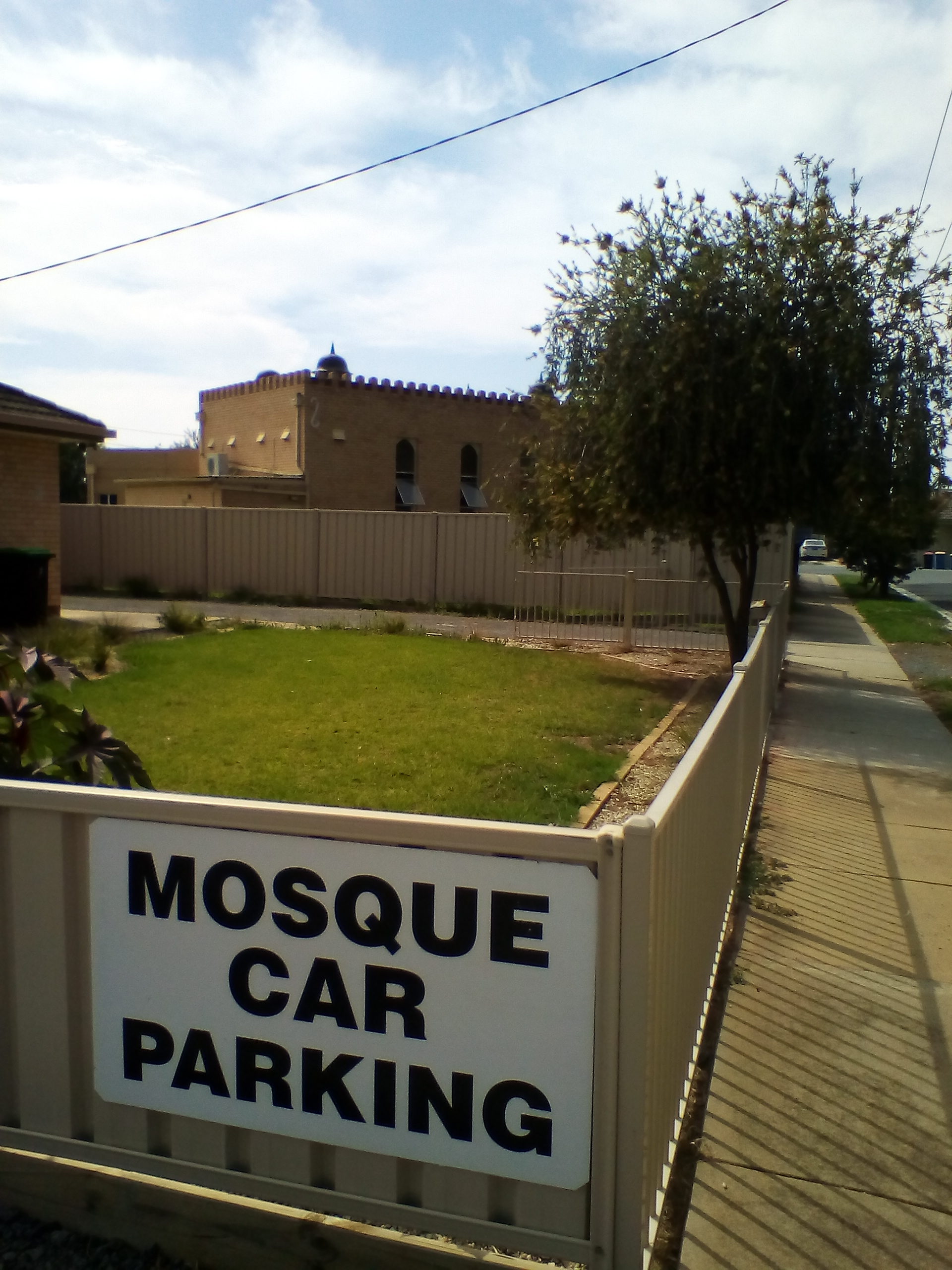
Mosque car park sign

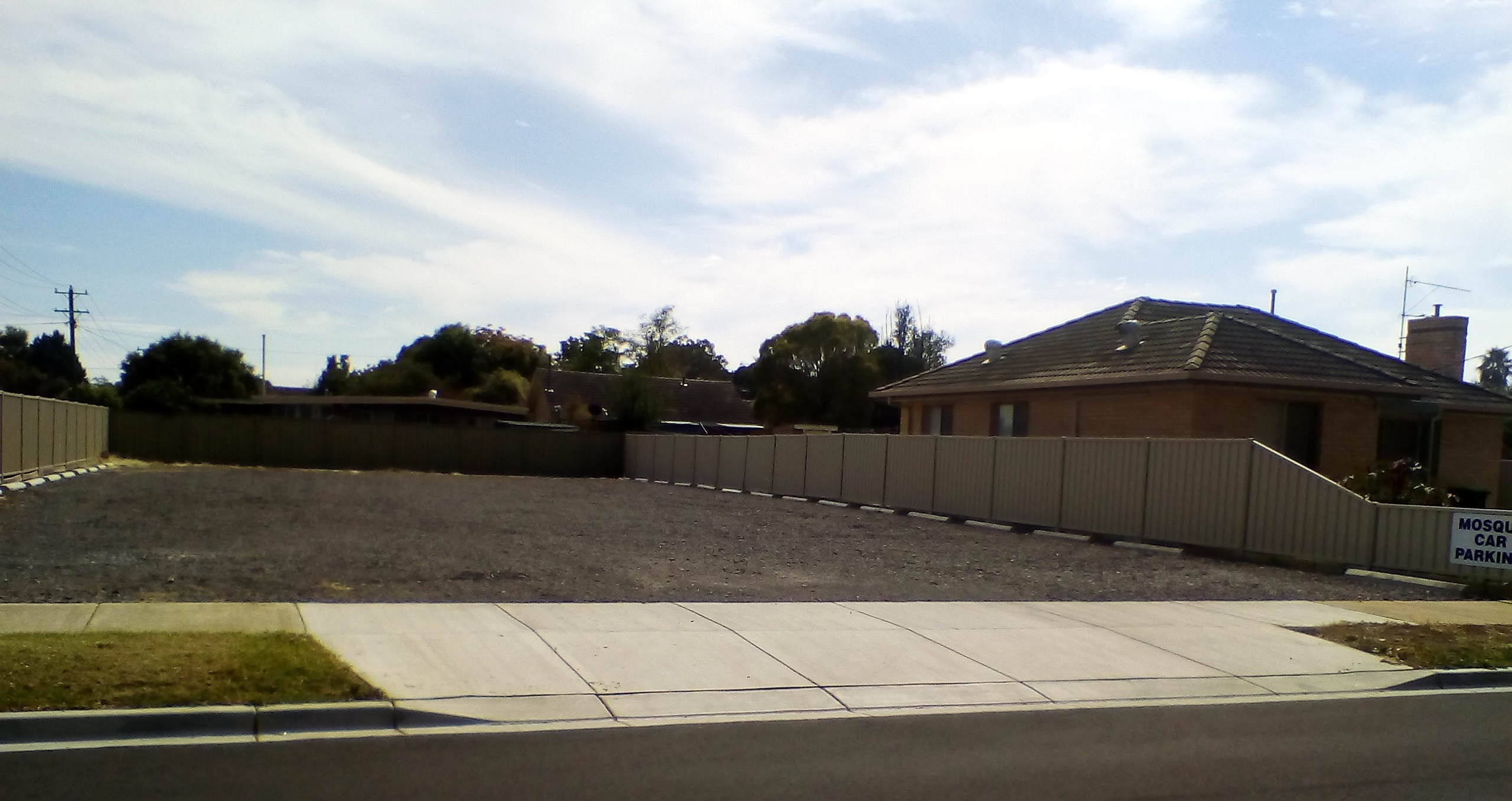
Mosque car park on Maple St

== See also ==
- Islam in Australia
- List of mosques in Australia
