= Ahmadiyya in Australia =

Islamic movement

Ahmadiyya is an Islamic movement in Australia, first formally founded in the country in the 1980s, during the era of the fourth caliph. However, the history of the Community dates back to the early 20th century, during the lifetime of the founder of the movement, Mirza Ghulam Ahmad. The first contacts had arisen from Australians travelling to British India, and also as a consequence of early, "Afghan" camel drivers settling in Australia during the mid to late 19th century. Today there are 100 Ahmadi mosques in all Australian states, representing an estimated 6,000-9,000 Australian Ahmadis in the country.

== History ==
=== Early Australian Ahmadi Muslims ===
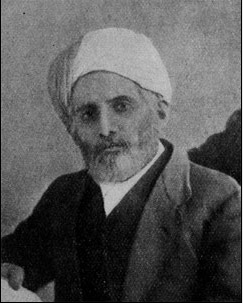
Hassan Musa Khan

The earliest history of Ahmadi Muslims in Australia dates back to the early 20th century, with the first contacts arising as a consequence of Australians travelling to British India, and also as a consequence of early, primarily Muslim, "Afghan" camel drivers settling in Australia during the mid to late 19th century.

Between the 1860s and the 1890s, a number of Central and South Asians came to Australia to work as camel drivers. Camels were first imported into Australia in 1840, initially for exploring the arid interior, and later for the camel trains that were uniquely suited to the demands of Australia's vast deserts. Among the cameleers was Hassan Musa Khan, a Tareen Pashtun businessman, from Sindh, British India, who arrived in Australia in 1894. After his arrival in Perth, he quickly rose to prominence, and became a spokesperson for Afghans settled in Western Australia, and at times for all Afghans in Australia. Khan was closely connected to prominent, and well educated Muslims overseas. In a meeting held in England, in 1895, by Abdullah Quilliam's Liverpool Muslim Institute, Khan was elected as one of several overseas honorary vice presidents of the institute, with Khan representing Afghans of Australia. He constituted one of the two key figures in the international network launched but the institute, the other being Joosub Moulvi Hamid Gool, from the South African Republic. Nevertheless, it was not until 1903 that Khan became acquainted with the claims of Mirza Ghulam Ahmad through two his brothers in India, who had by then become companions of Ahmad themselves. In September, whilst still in Australia, Khan finally wrote to Ahmad requesting him accept his desire to embrace Ahmadiyya.

In spite of becoming an Ahmadi Muslim, Hassan Musa Khan continued to play a significant role among the Muslims of Australia. In 1904, the local Muslim community gathered funds, and built one of Australia's first mosques, in William Street, Perth, today simply identified as the Perth Mosque. Khan played a pivotal role in promoting the construction of the mosque, and encouraging Muslims all over Australia and overseas to fund the project. In the year 1912, Khan returned to India, only to be turned back at the request of the caliph. He spent much of the rest of his life circulating and publishing on Islam in general and Ahmadiyya in particular. He produced monthly handbills, which contained extracts from overseas Ahmadiyya magazines and publications, such as the Muslim Sunrise and the Review of Religions. By 1923, he claimed to have made 156 communications to a variety newspapers. During the 1920s and 1930s Ahmadi literature secured a large audience among the Muslims of Australia. However, in the succeeding years, as a consequence of rising Muslim opposition against the Ahmadiyya movement, both in Australia and abroad, the Ahmadiyya factor continued to diminish. After serving as an "honorary missionary" of the Ahmadiyya movement for almost 30 years, Hassan Musa Khan died in 1945, and was buried in Karrakatta Cemetery, in Perth.

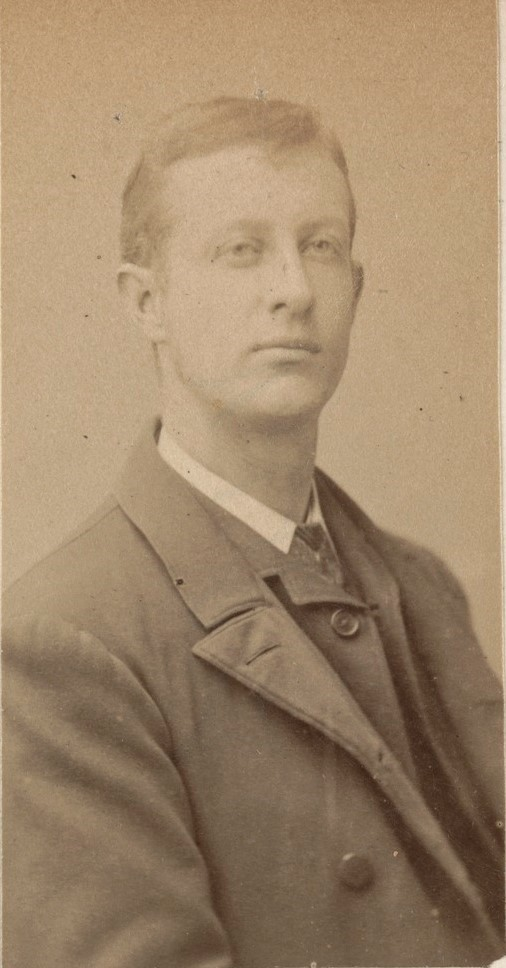
Charles Francis Sievwright

In a separate development, Charles Francis Sievwright was an 1862 Melbourne born Catholic who embraced Islam in 1896. It was not until several years later that he came into contact with the Ahmadiyya movement. In late 1903 he visited British India as a representative of the British and Indian Empire League of Australia to petition at the Indian National Congress at its annual conference to be held at Madras of that year. However, his visit had a two-fold objective. The second was to further educate himself regarding the Islamic faith. Following a lecture delivered by Sievwright on the question of "Are the Indian Peoples British Subjects?" in Lahore, a number of Ahmadi Muslims approached him to visit Qadian and to meet the founder of the Ahmadiyya movement, Mirza Ghulam Ahmad. On 22 October 1903 Sievwright arrived in Qadian. Describing his meeting as "miraculous", he stayed there for a number of days. However, it was not until a few years had passed, in 1906, shortly after shifting his home from Australia to New Zealand, that he announced in the Review of Religions his desire to join the Ahmadiyya Muslim Community, declaring:

"I have become a member of the Ahmadiyya Society of Qadian, so as to be associated with the most advanced sections of the Muslim Students of all the important Religions of the world, as well as to be united in a very active Muhammadan Missionary association for the spreading of the Islamic knowledge"

He adopted Muhammad Abdul Haqq as his Muslim name. Soon after his conversion, he moved to the United States, and became closely connected to the movement as soon as it was established in the country.

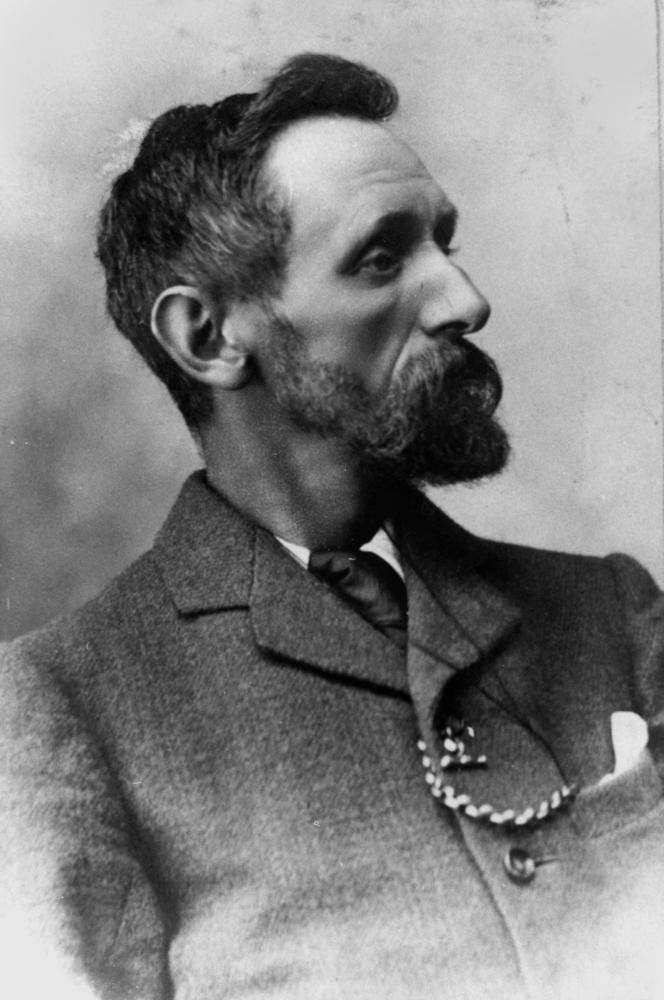
Clement Lindley Wragge

In another unrelated development, Clement Lindley Wragge, was an English-born meteorologist, who spent the majority of his career in Australia. However, to the end of his life, he was interested in theosophy and spiritualism. During his tour of India, in 1908, Wragge was delivering a lecture in Lahore, following which he was approached by Mufti Muhammad Sadiq, who requested him to meet the founder of the Ahmadiyya movement, Mirza Ghulam Ahmad. The meeting took place during the midday on 12 May 1908, roughly two weeks before Ahmad's death. The dialogues between the two are recorded in Malfūzāt, a set of books comprising the discourses of Ahmad. According to the letters written to Mufti Muhammad Sadiq, a companion of Ahmad, held in Ahmadiyya historical records, Wragge is said to have become a Muslim, and is said to have stayed so until his death. However, personal family records may suggest that Wragge remained a theosophist throughout the rest of his life.

=== Establishment ===
Despite the history of Ahmadiyya Muslim Community going back to the early 20th century, the Ahmadiyya movement in Australia was only founded in the 1980s. On 15 August 1979, Australian Ahmadis were finally given permission from the international headquarters, then in Pakistan, to formally register the movement in Australia. But it was not until 1987 that the Community was registered in the country.

=== Journeys by caliphs ===
The first caliph to visit the country was Mirza Tahir Ahmad, who first formally arrived in the country on 25 September 1983, via Fiji. The caliph laid the foundation stone of the first Ahmadi mosque in Australia five days later, on 30 September. He visited the country for the second time in 1989, for the Islamic festival of Eid-ul Adha.

The fifth and current caliph, Mirza Masroor Ahmad visited the country several times. His first visit, as a caliph, was in 2006, during the occasion of the national Annual Convention. On 18 October 2013, the caliph delivered a keynote speech on the occasion of the opening of the "Khilafat Centenary Hall" attended by over 300 people including state and federal politicians, academics, religious and community leaders.

== Demographics ==
Locations of the Ahmadi Muslim mosques in Australia.

There are an estimated 6000 Ahmadi Muslims in Australia, the majority of which consist of immigrant populations from Pakistan. However Ahmadi Muslims of Indian, Bangladeshi, Fijian, Ghanaian and Sierra Leonean origin exist in the country. By city, there are an estimated 550 plus Ahmadis in Adelaide and over 4000 Ahmadi Muslims in Sydney.

There are at least five mosques, in Five of the six Australian states. The Baitul Huda Mosque was opened in 1989 in Marsden Park, Sydney, New South Wales, and was the first of the five mosques opened in the country. The Baitul Masroor Mosque was opened in 2013 in Logan City, Queensland, south of Brisbane. Baitus Salam Mosque in Melbourne, Victoria and Mehmood Mosque in Adelaide, South Australia as well as in 2018 Nasir Mosque which opened in Perth, Western Australia, While the former two purpose-built, the latter two mosques are not. Similarly, there are no Ahmadi mosques in either Australia's federal or external territories, although a mosque is being planned in the capital Canberra, within the Australian Capital Territory. In 2013, a centenary complex, named the "Khilafat Centenary Hall" was opened beside the Baitul Huda Mosque, in Sydney.

== Modern community ==
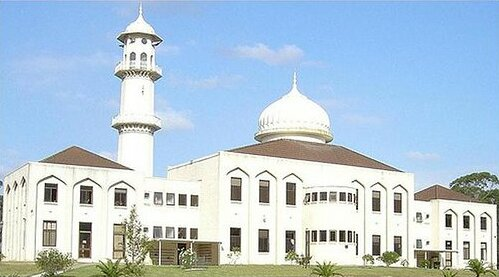
The Baitul Huda Mosque, in Sydney, was opened two years after the establishment of the movement in Australia

The leaders of the Ahmadiyya community advocate speaking English and being loyal to Australia. The Australian national spokesman has said, "We are loyal to Australia and we want our kids to be loyal to Australia", with association members delivering 500,000 Loyalty to Homeland leaflets. The Ahmadiyya community have participated in Clean up Australia days.

The association's external affairs secretary has said that no terror suspect had come from any Australian or international Ahmadiyya community. The community supports Australia's actions against jihadist radicalisation and denounces, as "an entire fabrication", teachings that there are 72 virgins awaiting Muslim terrorists.

== See also ==
- Islam in Australia
- Islamic schools and branches
