= Dervish Bejah =

Australian explorer

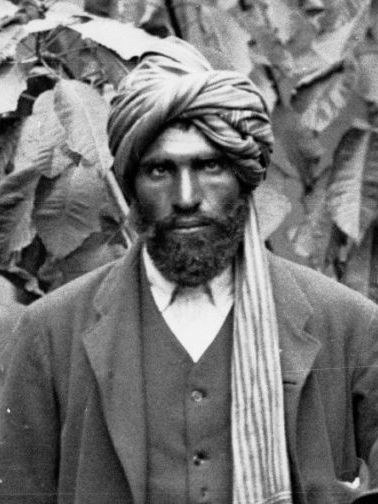
- Born: 1862
- Died: 1957; Port Augusta
- Occupations: Explorer, cameleer

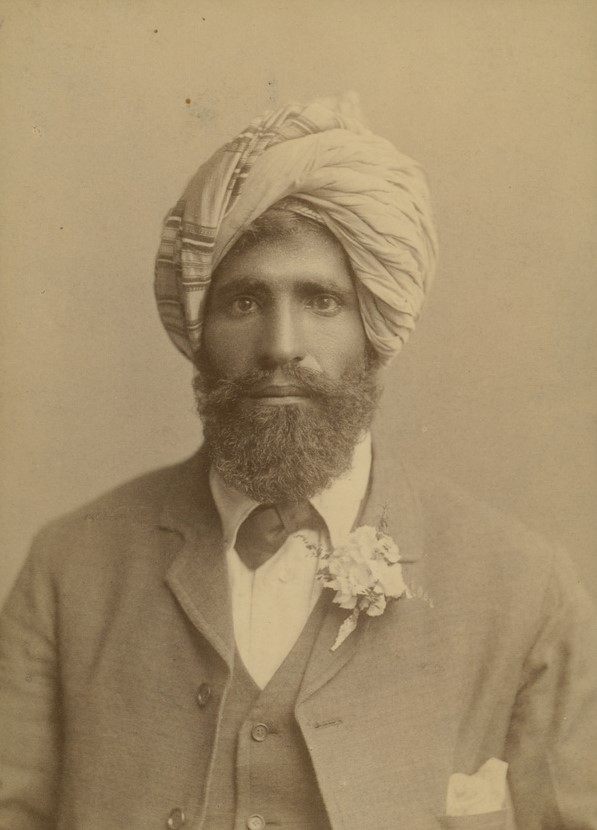
Portrait circa 1890

Dervish Bejah (c.1862–1957), also known as Bejah Dervish, or simply Dervish, was a camel driver who played a significant role in the exploration and development of outback Australia, before settling in Marree, South Australia and growing date palms.

== Life ==
Darvish Bejah was born in Baluchistan, then part of British India (since 1947 part of Pakistan). He served with British forces at Kandahar and Karachi under Lord Roberts, where he attained the rank of sergeant.

He moved to Australia in about 1890, arriving by sailing ship at the port of Fremantle. At that time, communities of Afghan cameleers were already established in Australia and involved in exploration and transport, having helped to construct the Overland Telegraph Line and open up the Western Australian Goldfields, amongst other accomplishments.

In 1896 Bejah was engaged by Lawrence Wells to manage the camels used for transport on the ill-fated Calvert Scientific Exploring Expedition to the Great Sandy Desert of north-central Western Australia.

In 1902 he settled in Marree, where he bought land and from where he operated his camel transport business. On 15 December 1909 he married a widow, Amelia Jane Shaw, and around 1930 he retired from camel driving to grow date palms.

On 6 May 1957 he died in hospital at Port Augusta and was buried in the local cemetery.

== Recognition ==
In 1954 Bejah was featured in the award-winning documentary film The Back of Beyond, directed by John Heyer.

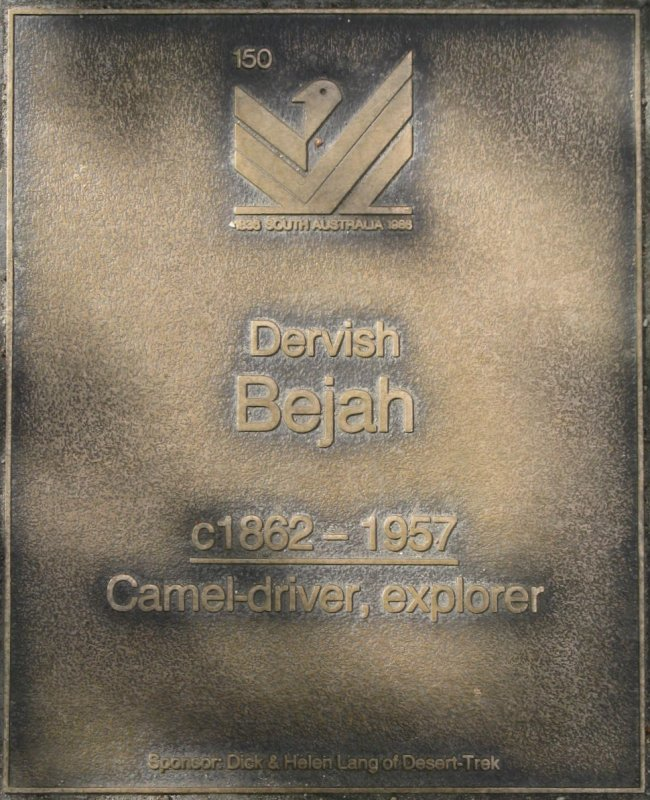
Bejah's plaque on the Jubilee 150 Walkway, Adelaide.

Bejah is commemorated by a plaque on the Jubilee 150 Walkway in Adelaide as someone who made a major contribution to the development of South Australia. It reads "Dervish Bejah, c1862-1957, Camel-driver, explorer".

He is lauded in the poem "Afghan" by Douglas Stewart, published in 1955

Along with his son Jack, Bejah is acknowledged in the preface of the book "Crossing the Dead Heart" by Cecil Madigan for "care in the selection and provision of an excellent camel team and equipment." The book details Madigan's 1939 Simpson Desert Expedition.

He was depicted in Megan Machin's radio serial Bejah Plants a Date Seed.

== Descendants ==
In 1891 he had a son, Ben Murray, with an Aboriginal (Arabana and Thirari) woman known as Annie Murray who was living in Marree. He would later teach his son, who also became a cameleer, some of his skills.

He also had a son with his wife Amelia, Abdul Jubbar (Jack). Abdul Bejah, son of Jack and grandson of Dervish, was on the Australian Outback Afghan Camelmen Descendants and Friends Memorial Committee that organised a memorial to the cameleers in Whitmore Square, Adelaide, in 2007.

== See also ==
- Afghan cameleers in Australia
