= Sallay Mahomet =

Afghan cameleer in Australia (1911–1983)

Sallay Mahomet, Camel Farm, Alice Springs.

Sallay Mahomet (16 September 1911 – 15 July 1983), sometimes spelled Saleh, was an Afghan Australian cameleer and camel trainer who lived for much of his life at Alice Springs.

Mahomet is perhaps best known for helping train Robyn Davidson for the 1977 camel expedition that is documented in her book Tracks, and a subsequent 2013 film adaptation.

== Early life ==
Mahomet was the son of Afghan Cameleer Gool Mahomet and his wife, French woman, Desiree Ernestine Adrienne Lesire who, following her marriage and conversion to Islam changed her name to Miriam Bebe. He was the couple's first child, born at Coolgardie, Western Australia on 16 September 1911, and his family moved around Australia for much of his childhood and early adulthood.

== Career ==
In 1931 Mahomet stopped travelling as much as he had when his father leased, and later purchased, Mulgaria Station in South Australia and he worked there for many years; taking over the management of it following his father's death in 1950.

In 1947 Mahomet married Australian woman Iris in two ceremonies; first a Muslim-Afghan ritual at the Adelaide Mosque (where he was Mullah) and then, on the same day, a Christian ceremony. Mahomet had an active Muslim faith for all of his life and, for many years he and his father Gool paid the rates and taxes for the impoverished Adelaide Mosque.

In 1962 Mahomet sold the station and moved to Alice Springs in 1963, where he established the 'Mahomet Trucking Company' with his three sons. It was said that "trucks were the new camels" and Mahomet and his sons began freighting between Alice Springs and Adelaide and Alice Springs and Darwin.

In Alice Springs Mahomet became a leader of the Islamic community in Alice Springs: a community made up primarily of descendants of the Afghan Cameleers. In 1975, following an unexpected phone call, Mahomet was asked to represent the Australian Government, then led by Gough Whitlam, on a trip to Saudi Arabia where he would present King Faisal with camels. Whitlam hoped that this gift would link these two countries in a 'cultural cousinship' and that this wealthy Arab nation would loan Australia money. Just before Mahomet's arrival in Saudi Arabia King Faisal was assassinated and had been replaced by King Khalid. On this trip Mahomet was able to make his first visit to Mecca.

On his return from this trip Mahomet sold his trucking company and established the Alice Springs Camel Farm as camels were becoming a popular tourist attraction in Alice Springs. At this farm he would catch and break-in feral camels, make saddles and harnesses and teach camel-handling. One of his students was Robyn Davidson who intended (and succeeded) in completed a solo overland journey with camels across the Gibson Desert and to the Indian Ocean. Mahomet trained Davidson for more than a year and provided her with two of the camels (Kate and Zeleika) that would accompany her on the journey. During this journey Davidson said that she would often recall Mahomet's advice and warnings; especially when faced with the ferocity of in season wild camels eyeing her herd.

== Death ==
Mahomet died on 17 July 1983, at the age of 72, at the Old Timers Home in Alice Springs. Following his death cards and telegrams of bereavement and sympathy arrived from all over the Muslim world. His name is displayed on the Cameleers Memorial in Alice Springs.

== See also ==
- Afghan cameleers in Australia
- Islam in Australia
