= Mahomet Allum =

(1858–1964) camel-driver, herbalist and philanthropist

Mohamet Allum
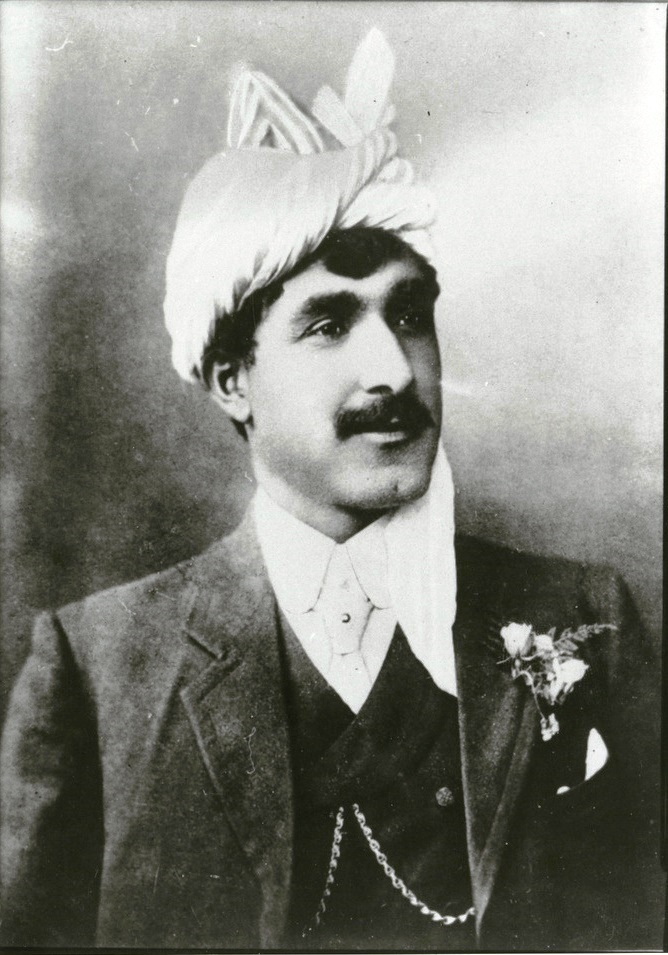
- Born: c. 1858; Kandahar, Afghanistan
- Died: 21 March 1964; Adelaide, South Australia
- Other names: Muhammad Alam Khan
- Occupation(s): Herbalist, former cameleer
- Years active: 1890–1964
- Known for: Herbal medicine, charitable works

Mohamet Allum (c. 1858 – 21 March 1964), also known as Muhammad Alam Khan or Mahomad Allum and nicknamed "The Wonder Man", was an Afghan herbalist based in Adelaide, South Australia.

He arrived as one of the Afghan cameleers brought into Australia to work on the camel trains which were being used to explore the interior of the continent in the late 19th century, and worked around the country before settling in Adelaide in 1899.

== Early life ==
Allum was a Pashtun born in Kandahar, Afghanistan, around 1858.

He travelled through Asia selling Arab horses and camels to the British Army, before sailing to Australia, arriving between 1884 and 1890. He was known to be in Kalgoorlie, Western Australia, in 1890, and again in 1903. He was present in Perth at the opening of the Perth–Coolgardie pipeline in 1903.

It is recorded that he took a French ship to Adelaide, arriving in Port Adelaide in 1899.

He ran a drapery business in Lismore, New South Wales, where he lost a court action in 1910 regarding unlawful seizure of his property. He experienced outright discrimination in at least one documented event, being charged 50% extra charged for his shipping passage from Burketown to Townsville "on account of not being a white person".

During the early 1900s (chronology unknown) is recorded as having run a drapery business in Duchess, Queensland (in Cloncurry Shire), working as a miner in Broken Hill (where he worked underground to learn about miners' ailments), and as a camel driver visiting Brisbane, Bourke in New South Wales, Farina, South Australia, the Nullarbor Plain, Townsville, Queensland and Broome, Western Australia. He practised herbalism in Wilcannia, New South Wales. He also distributed his herbal medicines wherever he travelled to those in need, especially the sick and the poor.

He married an Annie Baker in Cloncurry, Queensland in the early 1920s.

== Life in Adelaide ==
The date of his (at least second) arrival in Adelaide is not known, but after starting a herbalist business at 181 Sturt Street, Adelaide in 1938, not far from Adelaide Mosque, he became a well-known figure in the town. (Note: Jones says 1920s, but Affifudin (2018) shows the property transfer dates as 3 October 1938 to 14 April 1953.) He dispensed herbal mixtures and advice on a donations-only basis. He claimed the healing gift had been handed down in his family for 400 years. The South Australian Worker claimed that he saw about 600 people daily at his practice, enjoying popularity and gratitude from his clients, but he was less appreciated by the medical establishment, who took issue with his condemnation of vaccinations and other Western medicine. Described by them as a "quack", he was charged in 1935 with "Imposture as physician” under the Medical Practitioners Act 1919 and fined £45, with costs amounting to £65, despite over 40 witnesses having testified that he had never represented himself as a doctor. One parliamentarian questioned whether Allum’s prosecution was motivated by "persecution" against him.

Although he was occasionally extreme in his criticism of Western medicine, by all accounts his treatments, based on traditional Afghan and/or Islamic medicine, achieved good outcomes for his patients. His challenging of the prevailing view of European racial superiority was also rare at that time.

Described as "a generous philanthropist, devout Muslim and stylish dresser", photos of Allum all show him wearing a turban, which is a significant Pashtun tribal identifier. (Note: As per Affifudin (2018) p.20, the way that the turban is wrapped shows which tribe the wearer belongs to, but such research has not yet been done on Allum.)

He attracted huge numbers of patients, with one newspaper reporting "there is not a medical practitioner in Australia today with such a huge army of patients...". He enjoyed an enviable reputation, being referred to as “Humanity’s Benefactor,” “Wonder Man” and Adelaide’s “Uncrowned King". Perth's Sunday Times reported that people called him a "good Samaritan".

He frequently travelled to Afghanistan to find particular herbs which he used in his treatments, such as Veronica persica ("Persian speedwell"). One of his remedies was called "Blackjack", which consisted of butter, honey and senna pods, for stomach cleansing. On occasion he would distribute his herbal medicines to poor people, including Aboriginal people. He asked for donations only for all of his consultations and medicines, and donated most of his takings to the needy and charitable institutions.

Halimah (Effie?) Schwerdt, Allum’s secretary, became the first European woman in Australia to publicly embrace Islam. She was engaged to Allum in 1935-37, but there is no record of a wedding.

He married Jean Emsley in 1940, whom he had cured of severe dermatitis, and they had a daughter, Bebe Nora, born on 17 August 1941. "Bebenora" was enrolled for school on 17 February 1947.

Until the mid-40s, he enjoyed almost unanimous public support. However, after that point, he was criticised in some quarters, being described as “a foreigner, the most discussed man (except Hitler)” (The Bunyip, 1941) and “Australia’s most bizarre personality” (Smith's Weekly, 1946). It was around this time that his lifestyle changed somewhat from its previous simplicity; from having no car, he owned an expensive Daimler, and he possessed expensive jewellery.

During the worst years of the Great Depression, he gave away £15,000 in charitable donations. He was upset when the government taxed him £500 on these gifts, and decided to leave Australia. At this, Adelaide’s Lord Mayor, Members of Parliament, Christian ministers, police officers of high rank and others numbering 19,000 signed a petition which they presented to him, asking him to reconsider and return as soon as possible.

After selling their Sturt Street property on 14 April 1953, at Jean's request the family went to Afghanistan, where Jean converted to Islam. She died of smallpox after a year, having not been vaccinated and after performing hajj by visiting Mecca, Allum returned to Adelaide and bought a house at 68 Anzac Highway at Everard Park. Here he resumed his practice as a herbalist.

== Death and legacy ==
Allum continued his practice at Everard Park, but saw fewer patients as he aged, although did not suffer from serious illness. He had become estranged from his daughter Bebe, who possibly blamed him for her mother's death.

Allum died on 21 March 1964, (Note: Jones appears to be wrong or misprinted, citing his date of death as "12 March 1964".) at the certified age of 106. He was usually reported as being 108, but his death certificate said he was 106 years old. The funeral procession from the Adelaide Mosque to the Centennial Park Cemetery was reportedly over 1 mile (1.6 km) long. He had purchased the lease for a plot at the cemetery during its initial phase in 1935.

=== In print ===
A devout Muslim, Allum, aided by his wife and friends, sent letters to newspapers and published pamphlets on Islam, the Qur’an, and healing, although illiterate himself. In 1932 Allum published the booklet The History of Islamism in Australia from 1863-1932, edited by fellow ex-camel driver Hassan Musa Khan, in which he is described as "gifted Physician of Kandahar, herbalist in Australia". He also published many advertisements for his healing services in the South Australian Police Journal.

=== Respect and charitable works ===
A 1940 article in the Tasmanian Labor Party weekly, Voice, edited by Edmund Dwyer-Gray, then Treasurer of Tasmania, said that Allum had the support of Lady Gowrie, wife of the Governor-General, and "of a large number of Adelaide's most distinguished citizens". The author of the article (presumably Dwyer-Gray) opined that he was a "better Christian than most Christians" and wrote of talking to Allum in his "flower-bedecked" rooms in 1936. By 1940 he had given more than £15,000 to South Australian charities, apart from his free consultations to the poor.

His estate, worth £11,218, was nearly all left to charities which cared for children.

On Allum's 81st birthday, he bought 14 allotments at the Centennial Park Cemetery, in order to provide burial plots for other Muslims who could not afford a decent burial.

== See also ==
- Afghan Australians
- History of Islam in Australia
