= Hassan Musa Khan =

Australian businesspeople (1863–1939)

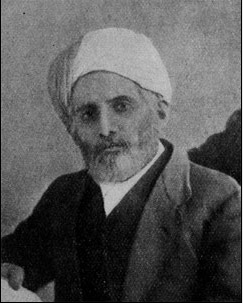
Hassan Musa Khan

Muhammad Hassan Musa Khan (30 May 1863 – 1939), also known as Mohamed Hasan Musakhan, Hasan Musakhan, or Hassan Musakhan, was one of the early so-called "Afghan" cameleers in Australia. Born in Karachi, a member of the Tarin tribe of Pashtuns. He was a nephew of Khan Bahadur Moradkhan, the first South Asian supplier of camels to Australia. Khan was the first Ahmadiyya Muslim in Australia, and was notable for being appointed as an arbitrator in a complex 1899 court case, involving camel importation to Western Australia.

After winning a Mansfield Scholarship at school, Khan won a Frank Souter Scholarship at the University of Bombay (Mumbai) in 1887. He was a schoolteacher and headmaster in British India from 1889 to 1892, and arrived in Australia in 1896. He was fluent in several languages including English, Pushto, Urdu, Persian, Sindhi, as well as some Arabic.

He may have brought his wife to Australia from India, according to a birth notice for his daughter, born at "Nurse Baseby's, King St in Coolgardie", in mid-1899.

Khan was a bookseller in Perth between 1904 and 1906. In 1904 he founded the Perth Mosque, and later served as its treasurer as well as secretary. He was a representative of the "camel men" at various official events between 1896 and 1927, and lived in Kalgoorlie in 1921 and in Adelaide, South Australia in 1932. He travelled to Delhi, India between 1911 and 1914. He donated books to the Battye Library in Perth.

With "wonder man" Mahomet Allum, Khan edited the booklet The History of Islamism in Australia from 1863-1932.

== See also ==
- Afghan cameleers in Australia
- Islam in Australia
- Ahmadiyya in Australia
