= Megan Machin =

Mrs Megan Machin (1906 – 20 May 1994), born Eleanor Margaret Sharpe, was an Australian journalist, playwright and author.

She was a student of Sydney Girls' High School, passing her Intermediate Certificate in 1923.

She became a journalist.

She was later a freelance writer, living in Castlecrag, Sydney.

She was possibly married to Alfred Herman Machin (c. 1906 – 18 November 1999), lived at Bayview, New South Wales and died on 20 May 1994.

In the 1940s at Marree, South Australia, while on a trip with "flying sister" Myra Blanch, she met 90-year-old cameleer Dervish Bejah. Bejah had assisted Larry Wells (Note: Misspelled "Weels" in many reviews of this radio play) on the Calvert expedition, while his son Jack was associated with Cecil Madigan's 1939 exploration of the Simpson Desert. Her play Bejah Plants a Date Seed, based on conversations she had with the cameleer, was joint winner (with Vance Palmer) of the Commonwealth Jubilee play-writing contest sponsored by the Australian Broadcasting Commission in 1951. The script was collected by the ABC managing director, Charles Moses, and is held by the National Archives.

The Australian Women's Weekly published several long articles by Machin.

She died in 1994, leaving a collection of engravings by Fred Coventry (Note: Frederick Halford Coventry (1905–1995) was a New Zealand artist who studied at the Julian Ashton school 1926–1929 before leaving for London. He was a friend of William Dobell; they briefly shared a flat in Bayswater, London. He is not to be confused with the Adelaide artist Fred Coventry (1913–1995).) in her will to the Art Gallery of New South Wales (321.1998–331.1998).
