= David Carnegie (explorer) =

English explorer in Australia

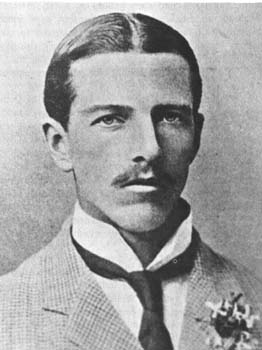
- Born: 23 March 1871; London, England
- Died: 27 November 1900 (aged 29); Lokoja, Nigeria
- Occupations: explorer and gold prospector
- Relatives: James Carnegie, 9th Earl of Southesk
- Writing career
- Subject: Carnegie expedition of 1896
- Notable work: Spinifex and Sand

David Wynford Carnegie (23 March 1871 – 27 November 1900) was an explorer and gold prospector in Western Australia. In 1896 he led an expedition from Coolgardie through the Gibson and Great Sandy Deserts to Halls Creek, and then back again.

== Early life ==
David Carnegie was born in London on 23 March 1871, the youngest child of James Carnegie, 9th Earl of Southesk. He was educated at Charterhouse in Godalming, Surrey but dropped out without graduating, and was thereafter educated by a private tutor. He later entered the Royal Indian Engineering College, but again dropped out without completing the course. In 1892, he travelled to Ceylon to work on a tea plantation. Finding it boring, he quit after a few weeks, and set sail for Australia with his friend Lord Percy Douglas.

== Gold prospecting ==
On arriving in Albany, Western Australia in September 1892, Carnegie and Douglas learned of Arthur Bayley's discovery of gold at Coolgardie, and immediately decided to leave the ship and join the gold rush. Together, they prospected around Coolgardie for a number of months, with little success. Eventually, Douglas left the field to raise finances in order for them to continue prospecting. Carnegie continued prospecting, joining the rush to Kalgoorlie after Paddy Hannan's discovery of gold there. He had little success, and by the middle of 1893 he was destitute. Unable to make a living as a prospector, he took a job at the Bayley's Reward mine in Coolgardie.

Late in 1893, Douglas was appointed a director of a new mining exploration company, thus securing finances for Carnegie's prospecting. In March 1894, Carnegie commenced his first prospecting expedition, in the company of a prospector and camel handler named Gus Luck. The pair initially explored the Hampton Plains immediately east of Kalgoorlie, but finding it extremely dry, they travelled instead to Queen Victoria Spring, about 250 km (160 mi) east of Kalgoorlie. From there they travelled north through unknown country to Mount Shenton, about 100 km (62 mi) north east of the present-day town of Laverton. After prospecting around Mount Margaret and Mount Ida, they returned to Coolgardie, having been away for ninety days and having travelled about 1,350 km (840 mi). They had found little evidence of gold, and nothing worth claiming a lease on.

In November 1894, Carnegie set out on his second prospecting expedition, this time in the company of two prospectors: an American named Jim Conley and an Irish-Victorian named Paddy Egan. The party initially travelled north, but hearing rumours of promising country near Lake Roe, they turned to the south east. After meeting no success around Lake Roe, they returned to the north, again exploring around Mount Margaret and Mount Ida. Early in February, after failing to locate a pool at Erlistoun, the party sought water in a granite outcrop near Lake Darlot, about 60 km (37 mi) east of the present-day town of Leinster. There, they had the good fortune to stumble upon the scene of a rich new find, before news of the find had reached Coolgardie. Having beaten the rush, Carnegie was able to discover and lay claim to a high quality reef. After working the reef for a period, the company sold the mine, and Carnegie received a substantial sum.

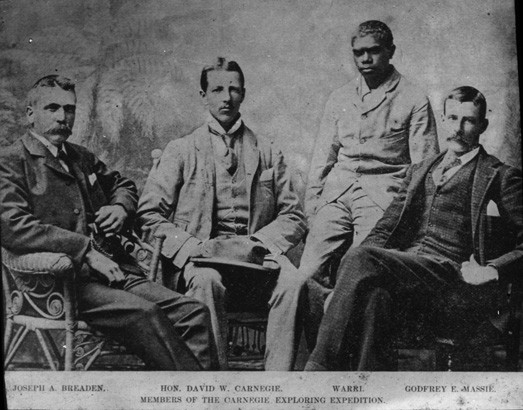
The Carnegie Exploring Expedition

Carnegie formed a syndicate with some friends, into which he deposited his camels, then returned to England to visit his family. Finding that his family were disappointed and embarrassed by his lack of an education and career, he returned to Australia determined "to prove that I am not the useless devil they have prophesied I would become". While he was away, his syndicate had pegged another mine, and shortly after his return it also was sold.

== Exploration ==
Carnegie invested his profits from the two mines in preparations for his major expedition; he proposed to travel almost 1,600 km (990 mi) from Coolgardie to Halls Creek. Much of the area through which he intended to travel was unexplored and unmapped, and Carnegie hoped to find good pastoral or gold-bearing land, and to make a name for himself as an explorer.

Carnegie's party consisted of five men and nine camels. His travelling companions were the prospectors Charles Stansmore and Godfrey Massie, bushman Joe Breaden, and Breaden's Aboriginal companion Warri. The party left Coolgardie on 9 July 1896. They travelled north to Menzies, then north east. On 23 July they entered largely unexplored country, and were immediately affected by the extreme scarcity of water. By 9 August they were desperately short of water; that day they came upon a native, who they captured and forced to show where water was located. The supply they were led to was an underground spring in a hidden cave, which Carnegie named Empress Spring after Queen Victoria. The party realised they could never have found this on their own. This became the pattern for the remainder of the expedition: whenever short of water, the party tracked down and captured natives, and tried to force them to lead the expedition to water.

Leaving the spring, the expedition continued north. Throughout August, September and October, the party passed through the desert country of the Gibson and Great Sandy Deserts. At first, the terrain was largely flat, and consisted almost entirely of spinifex and sand (hence the name Spinifex and Sand for Carnegie's published account of the expedition). Later, the flatness of the land was broken up by regular sandridges, running in an east-west direction. Since the party was travelling in a northerly direction, they had to cross these sandridges at right angles, and this made travel even more difficult. Carnegie later wrote of the land:

What heartbreaking country, monotonous, lifeless, without interest, without excitement save when the stern necessity of finding water forced us to seek out the natives in their primitive camps.

Carnegie managed to bring the party almost entirely through the desert without loss. However, on 2 November, with their journey nearing completion, a number of Carnegie's camels ate poisonous plants, and three died. Four weeks later, with the party only eight miles (13 km) from the Derby–Halls Creek road, Stansmore slipped while crossing a ridge, and dropped his gun. When the gun hit the ground, the cartridge exploded, and Stansmore was shot through the heart. He died instantly, and was buried nearby by his companions. The remaining members of the party reached Halls Creek four days later, after a journey of 149 days and 1,413 miles (2,274 km).

On arriving at Halls Creek, the party were informed that two members of the Calvert Exploring Expedition were missing in the desert. The Calvert expedition had taken a path roughly parallel to the Carnegie expedition, but about 100 miles (160 km) further west. Carnegie offered to join the search for the missing men, but despite his familiarity with the search area, he was not sent out immediately, being instead put on standby in Halls Creek. He formulated a search plan, and purchased three horses in anticipation of joining the search, but to the party's great frustration they remained on standby for nearly fifteen weeks. Eventually, it became obvious that the missing men must have perished, and Carnegie retracted his offer of help.

Carnegie's expedition was originally intended to terminate at Halls Creek, but since they had found no gold-bearing or pastoral land, the party decided to continue exploring, by returning to Coolgardie by a more easterly overland route. The party left Halls Creek on 22 March 1897, heading east then southeast, before eventually turning south. At first the going was easier than the trip north: water and game were easily found; the natives they encountered were friendly; and the camels' loads had been lightened, enabling them to carry a large supply of water. Later, the party experienced similar hardships to their northerly trip, scarcity of water being the main problem. Although they were able to carry plenty of water with them, this advantage was largely cancelled out by the presence of horses in the party, horses needing regular and generous watering. They arrived back in Coolgardie late in August 1897, having again found no land of interest to prospector or pastoralist.

Shortly after the completion of his expedition, Carnegie sold his assets and sailed for England. In England, he wrote and published a book on his experiences in Western Australia, entitled Spinifex and Sand. He also gave a brief lecture tour, and was awarded a medal by the Royal Geographical Society. However he was keen to resume exploring, and he expressed interest in joining an expedition from Cape Town to Cairo before eventually deciding against it. He also sought funding to lead an expedition to map the country between Lake Rudolf (now Lake Turkana) in northern Kenya and the Nile, but was unsuccessful.

Eventually Carnegie accepted a position as Assistant Resident of the Middle Niger in the Protectorate of Nigeria. He sailed for Africa in December 1899, and took up his job in late January 1900. In November 1900, Carnegie was sent to apprehend a fugitive named Gana. While searching the village of Tawari in the early hours of the morning of 27 November 1900, he was shot in the thigh with a poison arrow. He died fifteen minutes later. He was 29 years old.
