= Gus Luck =

- Born: Augustus Jules de Luc; May 23, 1867; Alsace, France
- Died: August 13, 1958 (aged 91)
- Occupations: Explorer and gold prospector
- Known for: Teaching explorer David Wynford Carnegie the bushmanship that enabled him to lead his expedition from Coolgardie to Halls Creek and return (1896–97), a journey of over three thousand miles and thirteen months in the desert which Carnegie describes in his book Spinifex and Sand

Augustus Jules Luck (de Luc) was an explorer and gold prospector in Western Australia. Luck is credited with teaching explorer David Wynford Carnegie the bushmanship that enabled him to lead his expedition from Coolgardie to Halls Creek and return (1896–97), a journey of over three thousand miles and thirteen months in the desert which Carnegie describes in his book Spinifex and Sand.

== Early life ==
It is believed that Luck was born on 23 May 1867 in Alsace, France to Jacques de Luc, a government employee, and Eve Hunsicker. It is not known at what age he left home to travel or when he arrived in Australia. He is believed to have been a Legionnaire, but Carnegie writes of him as being in the French Navy, and there is a photo of him as a private in "A" company, 1st. Battalion, Victorian Rifles in 1887. Due to his experience with camels in Algeria he was recruited for a survey and exploration expedition to Western Australia in 1888.

== Personal life ==
After his work with Carnegie, Luck went back to Victoria and married Emma Bees at Footscray on 3 November 1894. He was 27. Their first children, Dolly and Maggie, were born in Melbourne, but died in Menzies. While they lived in Boulder he worked as a loco driver on the Perseverance Mine. Their other children were born there: May (1901), Augustus (1903), Florence (1905), Marjorie (1907), Valerie Emma (1910), George (1911) and Veronica (1917). After leaving the goldfields he took up a farm at Southern Cross. He later built his house at 37 Great Eastern Highway, Victoria park, which was resumed for construction of the Causeway Bridge.

Luck died on 13 August 1958, much affected by the government land resumption, and was buried at Kalgoorlie. A lonely desert hill, Mt Luck (Lat. 28 degrees 51 minutes Long. 123 degrees 39 minutes) was named after him by Carnegie on 27 April 1894.
