= Albert Frederick Calvert =

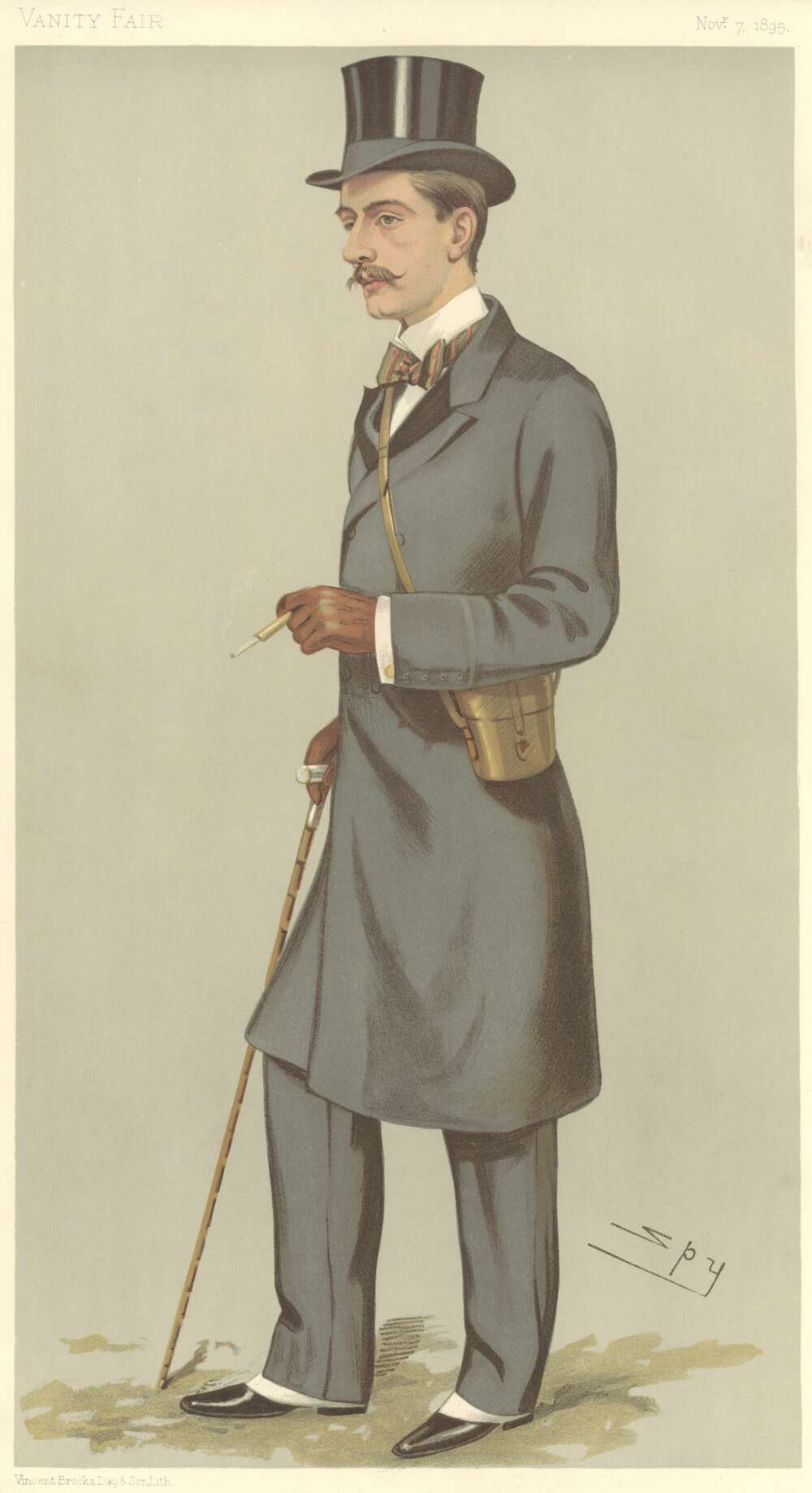
Portrait in Vanity Fair by Leslie Ward (1895).

Albert Frederick Calvert (1872-1946) was an English author, engineer and explorer active in Australia.

== Biography ==
Calvert's place and date of birth are uncertain. His mother was Grace Calvert, née Easley, and father a mining engineer John Frederick Calvert. His younger brother Leonard had joined his party travelling to Western Australia, but became ill and died at Roebourne while Albert was journeying to the interior.

The Australian Dictionary of Biography (1979) noted he was born on 20 July 1872 at Kentish Town, Middlesex, England, son of Frederick Calvert, mining engineer, and his wife Grace.

== Works ==
Calvert travelled to Western Australia with a party of servants and staff, preparing to tour the frontier as a well equipped member of the English gentry. Calvert visited the remote Murchison region of Australia in 1890. He returned to the region 1891 to continue his explorations and recorded a bird he called the "Spinifex Paraquet". Calvert reported that his specimen was lost, but an illustration of the discovery by George Edward Lodge was included in his 1894 publication Western Australia: its history and progress While some authorities have interpreted that as an encounter with the elusive night parrot, Pezoporus occidentalis, the species is likely to have been the scarlet-chested Neophema splendida.

After returning to England, where he published West Australian Review (1893–94) and promoted interest in the western regions of Australia, he financed and gave his name to the Calvert expedition. Calvert remained in England, where he engaged in costly pursuits of car and yacht sports and involved in horse racing. The outcome of expedition resulted in the successful crossing of the extreme environment at the Great Sandy Desert and the collection of specimens for scientific examination. As with many before and after, they unsuccessfully searched for evidence of the expedition led by Ludwig Leichhardt that had disappeared while crossing Australia's arid centre. Two men died on the Calvert expedition, along with other losses and deprivations, and when Calvert did not provide the funds for the expedition's costs he was publicly denounced. Further expeditions were instigated by the mining engineer, he later provided consultation to mining ventures at Mallina and temporarily placed as managing director of Big Blow Gold Mines and Consolidated Gold Mines of Western Australia.

Calvert was the author of fourteen books on Australia. They included superficial treatments of subjects such as minerals, pearls and the indigenous inhabitants, and later wrote thirty six books on Africa and Spain (including all the volumes in The Spanish Series published by John Lane, The Bodley Head). His last work is described as an unreliable account on the topic of Freemasonry.
