= Carnegie expedition of 1896 =

Western Australian exploration in 1896

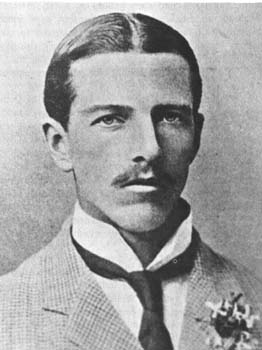
David Wynford Carnegie (1871–1900)

The Carnegie expedition of 1896 was led by David Carnegie. It covered territory in the centre of Western Australia, including the Gibson and Great Sandy Deserts.

== Aims and personnel ==
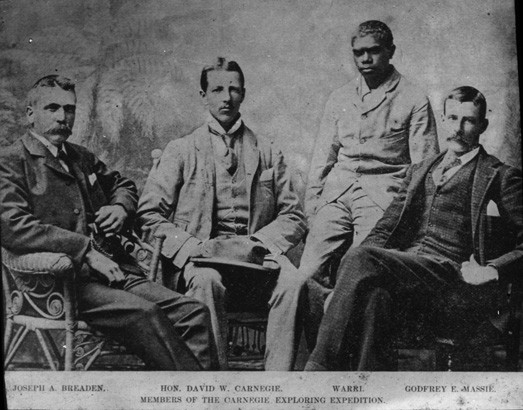
The Carnegie Exploring Expedition

The expedition was funded by Carnegie, who proposed to travel over 2,000 km (1,200 mi) from Coolgardie to Halls Creek. Much of the area was unexplored and unmapped, so Carnegie hoped to find good pastoral or gold-bearing land and make a name for himself as an explorer.

Carnegie's party consisted of five men. His traveling companions were the prospectors Charles Stansmore and Godfrey Massie, bushman Joe Breaden, and Breaden's Aboriginal companion Warri. The initial caravan consisted of nine camels.^{(Note 1)}

== Expedition ==
The party left Coolgardie on 9 July 1896. They traveled north to Menzies, then northeast. On 23 July, they entered the largely unexplored country and were immediately affected by the extreme scarcity of water.^{(Note 2)}

By 9 August, they were desperately short of water; that day they came upon a native, whom they captured and forced to show where water was located. They were led to an underground spring in a hidden cave, which Carnegie named Empress Spring after Queen Victoria. The party realized they could never have found water in the hidden spring without the assistance of a native, so for the remainder of the journey, whenever short of water, the party tracked down and captured natives and tried to force them to lead the expedition to water.^{(Note 3)}

Afterward, the expedition continued north. Throughout August, September, and October, the party passed through the desert country of the Gibson and Great Sandy Deserts. At first, the terrain was largely flat and consisted almost entirely of spinifex and sand (hence the name Spinifex and Sand for Carnegie's published account of the expedition). Later, the flatness of the land was broken up by regular sand ridges, running in an east–west direction. Since the party was traveling in a northerly direction, they had to cross these sand ridges at right angles, and this made travel even more difficult.^{(Note 4)}

On 2 November, with their journey nearing completion, a number of Carnegie's camels ate poisonous plants, and three died. Four weeks later, with the party only eight miles (13 km) from the Derby– Halls Creek road, Stansmore slipped while crossing a ridge and dropped his gun. When the gun hit the ground, the cartridge exploded, and Stansmore was shot through the heart. He died instantly and was buried nearby by his companions. The remaining members of the party reached Halls Creek in early December, after a journey of 149 days and 1,413 miles (2,274 km).^{(Note 5)}

On arriving at Halls Creek, the party was informed that two members of the Calvert Exploring Expedition were missing in the desert. The Calvert expedition had taken a path roughly parallel to the Carnegie expedition, but about 100 miles (160 km) further west. Carnegie offered to join the search for the missing men, but despite his familiarity with the search area, he was not sent out immediately, being instead put on standby in Halls Creek. He formulated a search plan and purchased three horses in anticipation of joining the search, but to the party's great frustration, they remained on standby for nearly fifteen weeks. Eventually, it became obvious that the missing men must have perished, and Carnegie retracted his offer of help.^{(Note 6)}

Carnegie's expedition was originally intended to terminate at Halls Creek, but since they had found no gold-bearing or pastoral land, the party decided to continue exploring by returning to Coolgardie by a more easterly overland route. The party left Halls Creek on 22 March 1897, heading east then southeast, before eventually turning south. At first, the going was easier than the trip north: water and game were easily found; the natives they encountered were friendly; and the camels' loads had been lightened, enabling them to carry a large supply of water. However, the three horses that replaced the three lost camels needed regular and generous watering, leading to the party experiencing similar hardships to their northerly trip. They arrived back in Coolgardie late in August 1897, having again found no land of interest to a prospector or pastoralist.^{(Note 7)}

== Accomplishments ==
Carnegie recorded the native words for a small number of common items and also produced sketches of native weapons and ceremonial implements.^{(Note 8)} He also documented his understanding of native marriage laws.^{(Note 9)}

== Publications ==
Carnegie later wrote of the land:

What heartbreaking country, monotonous, lifeless, without interest, without excitement save when the stern necessity of finding water forced us to seek out the natives in their primitive camps.^{(Note 10)}

The following publications contain information derived from this expedition:

- Carnegie, David W. (1898). Spinifex and Sand. London: C. Arthur Pearson. Republished in 1989 by Hesperian Press, Victoria Park, Western Australia. ISBN 0-85905-139-0.
- Peasley, William J. (1995). In the Hands of Providence: The Desert Journeys of David Carnegie. Perth, Western Australia: St George Books. ISBN 0-86778-056-8.

== Notes ==
All notes relate to Spinifex and Sand.

1. Part V Ch II
2. Part V Ch III
3. Part V Ch V
4. Part V Ch X
5. Part V Ch XIV
6. Part V Ch XV
7. Part VI
8. Appendix to Part V.
9. Part VI Ch I.
10. from Carnegie (1898).
