= John Carruthers (surveyor) =

John Carruthers (9 April 1847 – 22 April 1942) was a surveyor in South Australia, who fixed the boundary between the Northern Territory and Queensland.

== History ==
John Carruthers, Sr., (c. 1806 – 1 November 1887) originally from Dumfries, was a clothier with a business in Snow Hill, London. Deciding on the life of a farmer in the newly declared colony of South Australia, he emigrated aboard Cleveland with a supply of farming equipment, household furniture and two farm labourers, arriving in December 1839. He selected a property near the Torrens Gorge, where he established a makeshift dwelling in a cave, then built a comfortable cottage and shortly afterwards married Harriet Fill, a fellow passenger on the Cleveland.

In this idyllic setting their eldest daughter was born, but around 1842 he abandoned rural life for that of a publican, and moved into the city, taking over the "Royal Oak" hotel, then the "Globe Inn", on the Stephens Place corner of Rundle Street. In 1852 the licence was transferred to James Waterman, who died shortly after. In October 1852 he and his brother Robert, who had arrived aboard British Empire in August 1850, opened a wine and spirits shop at 51 Rundle Street as "J & R Carruthers", which business prospered, and for a time was the largest liquor outlet in Adelaide. Carruthers Creek was named for him by John McDouall Stuart on 30 April 1861. Then came the depression brought about by Governor Grey's financial stringency, and in 1864 with a crowd of creditors unable to pay their debts, Carruthers was forced to declare himself insolvent. His last decade was spent as a virtual recluse in his Pennington Terrace, North Adelaide home, an invalid in his last years but clear-minded and lucid to the last, survived a widowed daughter, one single and two married daughters, two married and three single sons.

John Carruthers, Jr. was born in Mitcham, and as a 10-year-old boy attended Mrs. Hillier's school at Brighton, and his cousin Robert Carruthers, Jr., were prize-winning students at Mr. Webster's Adelaide Commercial School, Grenfell Street in 1860. He also attended Adelaide Educational Institution, and Whinham College in North Adelaide. Leaving school, his first employment was with shipping agents Stilling & Co., then with landbroker W. M. Letchford (later Shuttleworth & Letchford), after which he served as clerk of works and timekeeper at the Government railway carriage and locomotive works, but was retrenched during the financial stringencies of the 1864–1866 drought. He decided to try his luck in New Zealand, but found things little better. He found work on a flax farm near Dunedin, and a potato farm near Lake Waikareiti, as a shipping foreman with Boyle & Co. in Dunedin, then at a flax mill. His last job in New Zealand was in charge of a horse working a whim over a coal mine.

At the age of 25 he returned to South Australia, and in 1873 after an interview with the Surveyor-General, George Goyder, he entered the service under Charles Wells. His first work was at Wirrabara. He was then appointed assistant to David Lindsay (who led the 1891 Elder expedition), working as surveyor in the south-east, surveying for "educational blocks" (whose income was earmarked for educational purposes) at Wirrega. From there to Kangaroo Island he cut up the Hundreds of Haines and Cassina for farms. Then he went up the Murray to the Hundred of Pyap, and Lyrup where there the Irrigation Settlements would be founded in 1894. In 1885 he and Larry Wells completed the boundary line between the Northern Territory and Queensland to the Gulf of Carpentaria. He undertook further surveying work in the Musgrave and Tomkinson Ranges, and Deering Hills to the western boundary.

He retired at the age of 49 to his property in Narracan, Gippsland.

== Family ==
John Carruthers (c. 1806 – 1 November 1887) married Harriet Fill (c. 1820 – 25 May 1899), a daughter of William Fill (c. 1888 – 16 January 1866) at Trinity Church on 12 December 1840. Their children were:

- Ellen Mary Carruthers (c. 1841 – 30 August 1919) married Benjamin James Price ( – 10 September 1882) on 9 February 1865. She was a noted citizen of Kapunda and Mount Barker.
- William Carruthers (c. 1843 – ) married Harriet Lucy Witherick (5 September 1853 – 14 May 1934) on 13 February 1876.
- Catherine Carruthers (27 April 1845 – 22 February 1925) married George Baynton (c. 1834 – 4 July 1921) on 9 February 1865 (a double wedding with sister Ellen)
- John Carruthers (9 April 1847 – 22 April 1942) married (Margaret Florence) Laura Carruthers (c. 1872 – 12 July 1958) on 27 June 1911. She was a daughter of Robert Carruthers (c. 1819 – 18 August 1873) and Mary Katherine Carruthers, née Hogg, (c. 1827 – 5 September 1909), married on 13 June 1855, of Mitcham.

- John Harrison Carruthers (19 August 1913 – 1998)

- Charles George Carruthers (9 August 1849 – 28 May 1926) married Eliza Graham Pizey (c. 1864 – 28 April 1898) on 21 August 1884.
- Lucy Harriett Carruthers (31 May 1851 – 21 July 1934) married Septimus Verinder Pizey (27 April 1838 – 14 December 1893) on 26 May 1870. He was secretary of Adelaide Jubilee International Exhibition, founder of Chamber of Manufactures.

- Elizabeth Hobart Pizey (1887–1925) married Clive Melville Hambidge (1888–1950) on 31 May 1913

- Cuthbert Carruthers (c. 1852 – 22 January 1937) married Rachel Mackman née Douglas (c. 1857 – 31 March 1943) on 3 November 1896
- Lillian Margaret Carruthers (c. 1861 – 11 July 1937) married Arthur Edward Barry (c. 1855 – 11 November 1944) on 20 August 1890
