= Gool Mahomet =

Afghan cameleer in Australia (1865–1950)

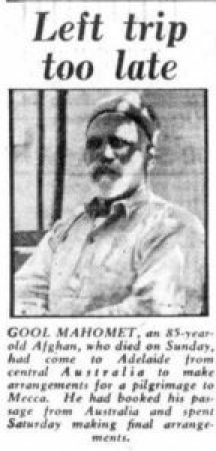
Gool Mahomet

Gool Mahomet (1865 – 21 May 1950), also known as Gul Muhammed, was an Afghan cameleer who immigrated from Kabul to Australia in the late 19the century. He worked in and around Central Australia.

== Early life ==
Gool Mahomet was born in 1865 in a small village near Kabul, Emirate of Afghanistan . He worked in Colombo, in Sri Lanka, to help pay for his passage to Australia. The date that Mahomet immigrated to Australia is uncertain, being recorded as both 1887 and 1897.

He initially arrived in Fremantle, Western Australia, before moving, almost immediately, to Port Augusta and then Parachilna in South Australia.

== Work as a cameleer ==
Once in South Australia Mahomet worked on the railhead and carted copper by camel from Blinman back to the railhead. Following this Mahomet worked in a number of jobs, including time at Hergott Springs, Mt Morgan, in Queensland (1905-1906), Wilgena Station in South Australia, and then, in 1907, to the Western Australian Goldfields around Kalgoorlie, where he carted wood. In these early years, Mahomet was a regular opium user, as was common at the time – many Afghans believed that opium was good for the stomach. However, after coming across a group of compatriots in a "dishonourable state", he never took it again.

In Kalgoorlie Mahomet met and married French prostitute Desiree Ernestine Adrienne Lesire, five weeks after meeting. They were married in the Kalgoorlie Mosque by Secundah Khan on 18 March 1907. Lesire converted to Islam and changed her name to Miriam Bebe, and their wedding was followed by a civil ceremony in Port Augusta on 17 August 1907. This marriage attracted a lot of interest, and onlookers were apparently confounded and dumbfounded by the match with many surmising that it was a "business flirtation". It was reported that, as a well-known camel contractor, Mahomet was "in the possession of more than the average man's share of this world's goods" and that he held the bill of sale over at least 60 head of camels.

It is unsure where the couple lived in the years immediately following their marriage but their son, Sallay Mahomet, was born in Coolgardie, Western Australia on 16 September 1911, and the couple had five more children: two more sons and three daughters.

In 1913 the family settled at Bummers Creek, near Leonora, where they established a market garden at the Afghan settlement where they grew melons, vegetables, and dates, as well as providing water and wood to the gold miners.

The family continued to move around the country, travelling across the country by camel on a regular basis, including one trip from Perth to Broken Hill, a distance of almost 3,000 km (1,900 mi), to visit a sick friend or relative.

From 1919 to 1934 Mahomet worked for Elder Smith & Co. Ltd carrying supplies for their numerous properties, until Mahomet leased Mulgaria Station, a 363-square-mile (940 km^{2}) property on the shores of Lake Torrens northwest of Beltana. In 1935, with motor vehicles taking over, he let his camels free to roam.

Eventually, in 1939, he bought the station, with Elders' help, and he began training racehorses. Following his death, his son Sallay took over the management of the station before selling it in 1962 to move to Alice Springs, where he established the Mahomet Trucking Company.

Miriam Bebe, Mahomet's wife, never lived at Mulgaria, preferring to stay in Farina. She died of a heart attack on 16 January 1939 at the age of 58.

In 1940 Mahomet became mullah, alongside his son Sallay, at the Adelaide Mosque in Little Gilbert Street, and began travelling regularly to Adelaide. The mosque was impoverished at this time and Mahomet paid the rates and taxes on the property.

== Death ==
In 1950 Mahomet decided to return to home to Afghanistan and, on his way there, make a visit to Mecca. Having booked his passage, he died on 21 May 1950, in the Adelaide Mosque, aged 85.

He was referred to as one of the "best known members of the Australian Afghan community".

== In popular culture ==
The 2026 play Logan St, written and directed by Jacob Boehme and staged by the State Theatre Company of South Australia, features the 1940s friendship between Gool Mahomet, played by Ali Ammouchi, and Aboriginal woman Dulcie Sansbury, played by Alexis West

== See also ==
- Afghan cameleers in Australia
- Islam in Australia
