= Faiz Mahomet =

Afghan cameleer in Australia (1848 – 1910)

Faiz Mahomet (c. 1848 – 1910) was an Afghan cameleer who migrated to Australia in 1870. He worked in South Australia and Western Australia, including in partnership with his brother Tagh Mahomet, and laid the foundation stone for the Perth Mosque in 1905. His wife was first cousin to the Amir of Afghanistan.

== Life ==
Faiz Mahomet was born in Kandahar, Afghanistan, but moved with his family to Karachi, following their pilgrimage to Mecca while he was six years old. At the age of seven he and his brother, Tagh Mahomet, lost both their parents. First working as a building labourer, he later served in the Abyssinian War during his teenage years as part of the transport service of the British Artillery. Following this he workerd on the construction of the telegraph line across Karachi and Balochistan, and the Karachi breakwater, where he supervised 500 camel drivers.

On December 31, 1865, he travelled to Australia with his brother Tagh to operate Elder Smith & Co.'s camel station in Marree, South Australia. In 1880, Mahomet bought the station and in 1888, Sir Thomas Elder loaned Mahomet 1000 pounds to purchase camels at Farina. From there he travelled to Karachi to purchase 300 camels and hire 70 camel drivers, with whom he returned to Australia. His son Gholam Mahomet was born in Karachi, in 1885.

In 1892, Faiz and Tagh established themselves in the Western Australian goldfields, and set up camel stations and stores in Coolgardie, Geraldton, Cue, Day Dawn and Mullewa.

When miners seeking gold out of Coolgardie were at risk of famine in 1893, Faiz Mahomet sent out his cameleers to provide them assistance. Though offered payment by the government as compensation, Mahomet refused, saying that "These men are the Sons of God and therefore I have saved them".

In 1895, Mahomet was involved in petitioning for the protection of the lives and property of Afghans in Australia against threats from Europeans.

His brother, Tagh, was murdered on 10 January 1896 while praying in the Coolgardie Mosque. Goulah Mahomet was hanged at Fremantle Prison for shooting Tagh in the back, who he claimed had threatened him.

Despite receiving permission from the Western Australian government of Sir John Forrest to import 500 camels and their drivers in 1900, this permission was subsequently revoked by the later government of George Leake. This decision had significant financial consequences for Faiz Mahomet and a select committee determined that he was entitled to compensation.

Faiz Mahomet was involved in raising funds for the construction of the Perth Mosque, travelling across Western Australia to seek donations from Afghan cameleers. On 13 November 1905, Faiz Mahomet laid the foundation stone for the mosque.

Mahomet later returned to India, where he died in 1910.

== Legacy ==
A commemorative plaque for Faiz and Tagh Mahomet is located on St Georges Terrace in Perth, noting their work in creating access to the interior of Western Australia in the 1890s, before the building of the railway.

== See also ==
- Afghan (Australia)
- Afghan cameleers in Australia
- Islam in Australia
