= George Arthur Keartland =

Australian typographer and ornithologist

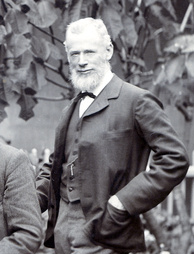
George Arthur Keartland

George Arthur Keartland (11 June 1848 – 21 May 1926) was an Australian typographer and ornithologist notable for his collecting work on the Horn and Calvert scientific exploring expeditions.

Keartland was born in England at Wellingborough, Northamptonshire, but moved to Melbourne in the Colony of New South Wales with his family in 1850. In 1851 the area became the Colony of Victoria. He attended school in Fitzroy, trained as a photographer, completed an apprenticeship to a printer and became a compositor at The Age for over fifty years. Keartland joined the Melbourne Typographical Society in 1871 and served as president of the Australasian Typographical Union twice. In 1873 he married Margaret Jane Nicol, the couple settling in Collingwood.

From the mid-1880s Keartland became increasingly interested in natural history and, especially, ornithology. He joined the Field Naturalists Club of Victoria (FNCV) in 1886 and became expert at skinning birds. He served as the ornithologist/collector on the Horn Expedition to central Australia in 1894 as well as on the Calvert Expedition to north-west Australia in 1896–97, bringing back important collections of bird specimens from both.

Keartland was a founding member of the Royal Australasian Ornithologists Union in 1901 as well as serving as President of the FNCV in 1907–1909. He died of cancer at his home in Preston, being survived by his wife, two of five sons and four of six daughters. He is commemorated in the scientific name of the grey-headed honeyeater (Lichenostomus keartlandi).

Keartland is buried at Coburg Cemetery, Preston, Victoria. His grave is included in a self-guided heritage walk at the cemetery and information about his life is available on a sign posted at his graveside.
