= Augustus Poeppel =

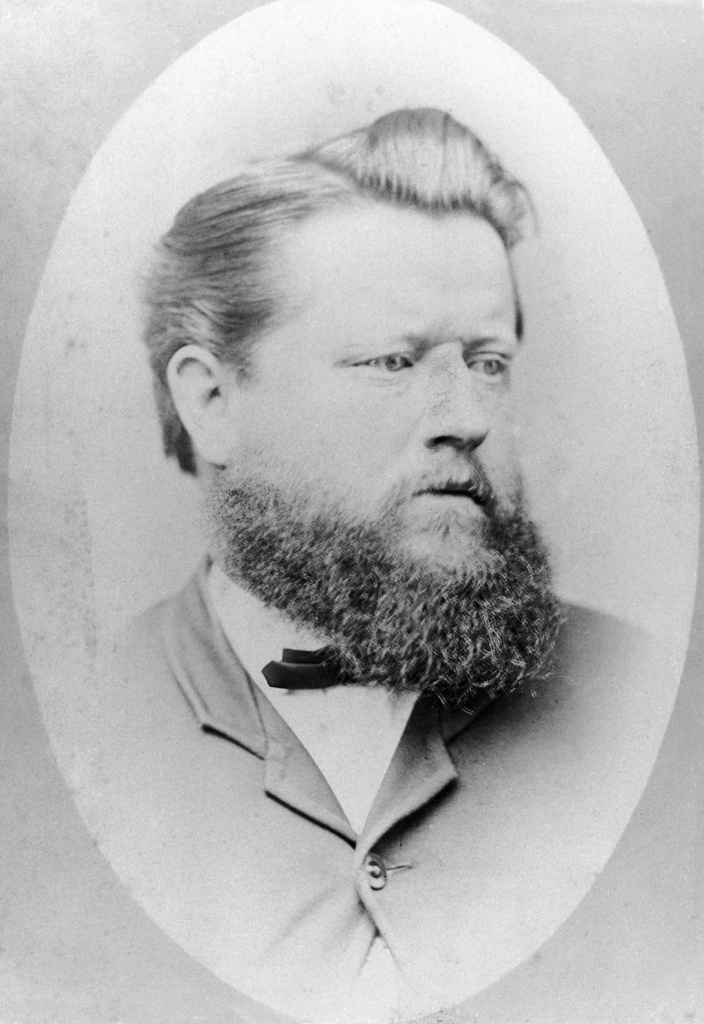
Augustus Poeppel, circa 1880

Augustus Poeppel (1839–1891) was a surveyor and explorer in Australia. He surveyed the borders between Queensland, South Australia and the Northern Territory.

== Early life ==
Augustus Poeppel was born in Hamburg, Germany in 1839, the son of an architect. Emigrating with his family in 1849, he settled in South Australia.

== Surveying career ==
Poeppel moved to Victoria to become a mining surveyor and architect. In 1878, after short periods in New Zealand and Western Australia, Poeppel joined the South Australian Lands Department and was soon appointed to the border surveys. He surveyed both Poeppel Corner (the point where the Northern Territory, Queensland and South Australian borders meet) and Haddon Corner (where the Queensland and South Australian borders meet).

During the Queensland-Northern Territory border survey, from the 142-mile post, he suffered from trachoma and lost 13 kg in weight, forcing his withdrawal in July 1885. His health was broken and he later lost sight in one eye.

== Later life ==
Poeppel retired to Melbourne where he died in 1891 aged 52.

== Legacy ==
Poeppel Corner (the point where the borders of Queensland, South Australia and the Northern Territory meet) was named after him and is listed in the Queensland Heritage Register. Haddon Corner is also listed on the Queensland Heritage Register.

There is a monument to Poeppel across the road from the Birdsville Hotel in Birdsville, Queensland (25.899241°S 139.351496°E). It was dedicated on 2 October 2003.
