= Central Adelaide Mosque =

Mosque in Australia

Central Adelaide Mosque Afghan Chapel
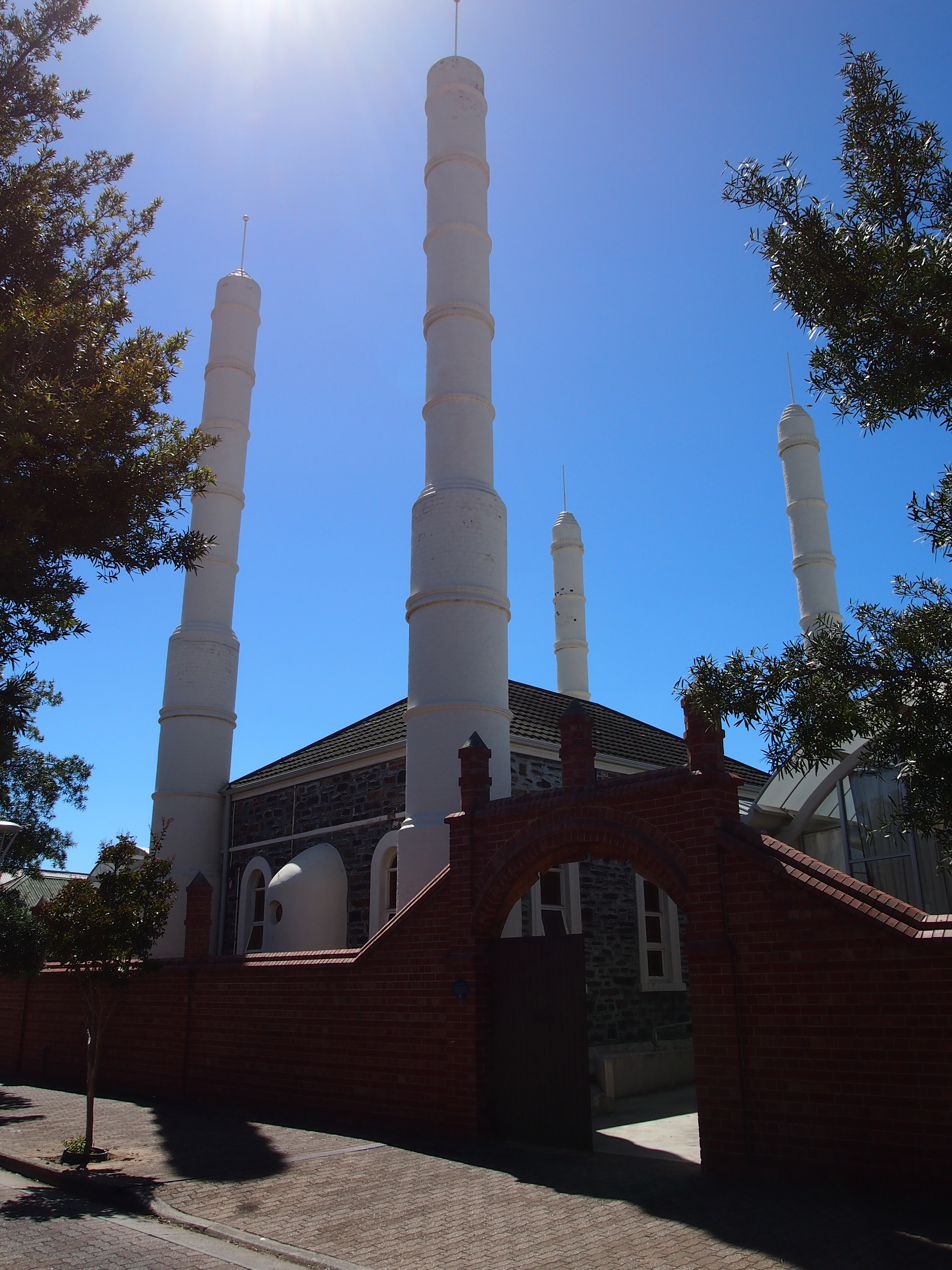
- Adelaide Mosque

- Location in South Australia

Religion
- Affiliation: Sunni Islam
- Sect: Hanafi
- Ecclesiastical or organisational status: Mosque
- Status: Active

Location
- Location: Adelaide, South Australia
- Country: Australia

Architecture
- Type: Mosque
- Established: 1888
- Construction cost: £450

Specifications
- Dome: 1
- Minaret: 4

The Central Adelaide Mosque, also known as Adelaide City Mosque or Adelaide Central Mosque or Adelaide Mosque, and formerly known as the Afghan Chapel, is a mosque located in Adelaide, South Australia. The mosque was built in 1888–1889, with its four distinctive minarets added in 1903, and is the oldest permanent mosque in Australia. Located in Little Gilbert Street in the south-west corner of the Adelaide city centre, the mosque was originally built to accommodate the spiritual needs of "Afghan" cameleers and traders coming in after working in South Australia's northern regions. After the congregation dwindled and the mosque fell into disrepair in the early 20th century, it took on a new lease of life with post-World War II Muslim migration, and has since been thriving.

== History ==
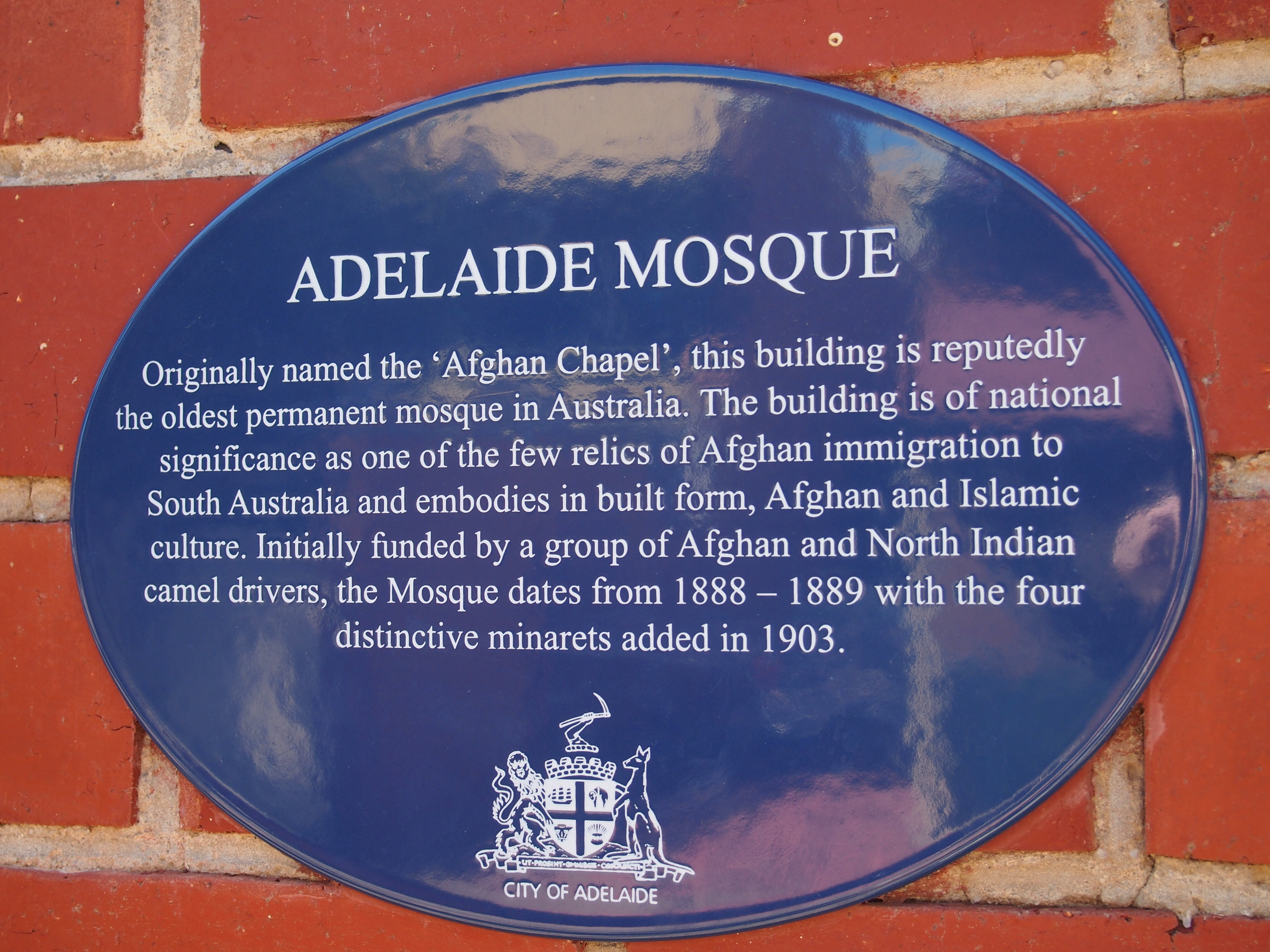
Adelaide Mosque historic plaque

Hadji Mullah Merban came from Kandahar, Afghanistan. He planned on retiring and moving to Adelaide after leading camel teams on the Australian Overland Telegraph Line and subsequently becoming a respected spiritual leader, led the moves to have a mosque built. Abdul Wade (also known as Wadi, Wabed, Wahid), originally from the Quetta district (now Pakistan) and then merchant and cameleer in the area of Bourke, New South Wales, became the trustee and builder of the mosque. Funding was raised through donations from the small Muslim community in Adelaide and also from Melbourne.

Plans for the mosque were approved by the Adelaide City Council in 1887 and the simple building of brick and stone, costing £450, took two years to complete. Hadji Mullah became the first caretaker of the mosque, living with his wife in a cottage in the grounds. There was also accommodation provided for aged and unemployed cameleers and other members of the community.

In July 1890, it was reported that Friday night worshippers usually numbered 20–40, with up to 100 attending on big occasions. Muslims from as far away as Broken Hill and Kalgoorlie gathered at least once a year at the Adelaide Mosque, usually for the Fast of Ramadan. In August 1890, over 80 Muslims and one Hindu were present to observe this important festival.

Four minarets were added in 1903, and the mosque gardens grew lush and mature.

Over time, as the cameleers passed on or returned to their countries of origin, the mosque became unused and decrepit, until the post-World War II wave of migration to Australia. Muslims arriving mostly from Bosnia and Herzegovina in the then Yugoslavia, and the newly independent Indonesia boosted the congregation.

In 1950, Ahmed Skaka, who had trained as an imam in Sarajevo and enlisted in the Yugoslav Army before being imprisoned by the Nazis in Bosnia, migrated to Australia. After moving to Adelaide from Melbourne, he and a fellow Muslim from Romania obtained work at Clipsal. (Note: This Ahmed Skaka should not be confused with the Croatian Imam who was in the Croatian Army during the second world war and looked exactly the same as the one in question. This Ahmed Skaka is a completely different one.)

They were alerted to the existence of the mosque upon hearing of the death of Gool Mahomet, who had donated money to construction of the mosque, been Mullah there since 1940, and stayed there on frequent visits to Adelaide. The pair set out to find the mosque and found that the congregation consisted of only two or three aged Afghans. Skaka then became Imam at the mosque. In 1951, only seven people attended the Eid prayer. All of the old Afghans continued to wear national dress, including the old caretaker, Iset Khan, who lived at the back of the mosque and refused to use electric lighting. In 1952, a small number of "ancient, turbaned men", aged from 87 to 117, were reported to be still living at the Adelaide mosque. The new migrants cared for the old people and set about restoring the mosque after their death.

Since then, the Adelaide Mosque has become a place of prayer for Muslim migrants from Bosnia, Lebanon, India, Pakistan, Indonesia, Malaysia and other countries, as well as Australian-born Muslims and converts.

== Names ==
The mosque used to be referred to as the Afghan Chapel, and the current website refers to itself as Adelaide City Mosque or Adelaide Central Mosque.

== In popular culture ==
The 2026 play Logan St, written and directed by Jacob Boehme and staged by the State Theatre Company of South Australia, features the 1940s friendship between Gool Mahomet, played by Ali Ammouchi, and Aboriginal woman Dulcie Sansbury, played by Alexis West.

== See also ==
- List of mosques in Oceania
- Afghan (Australia) (about the cameleers)
