= Perth Mosque =

Mosque in Perth, Western Australia, Australia

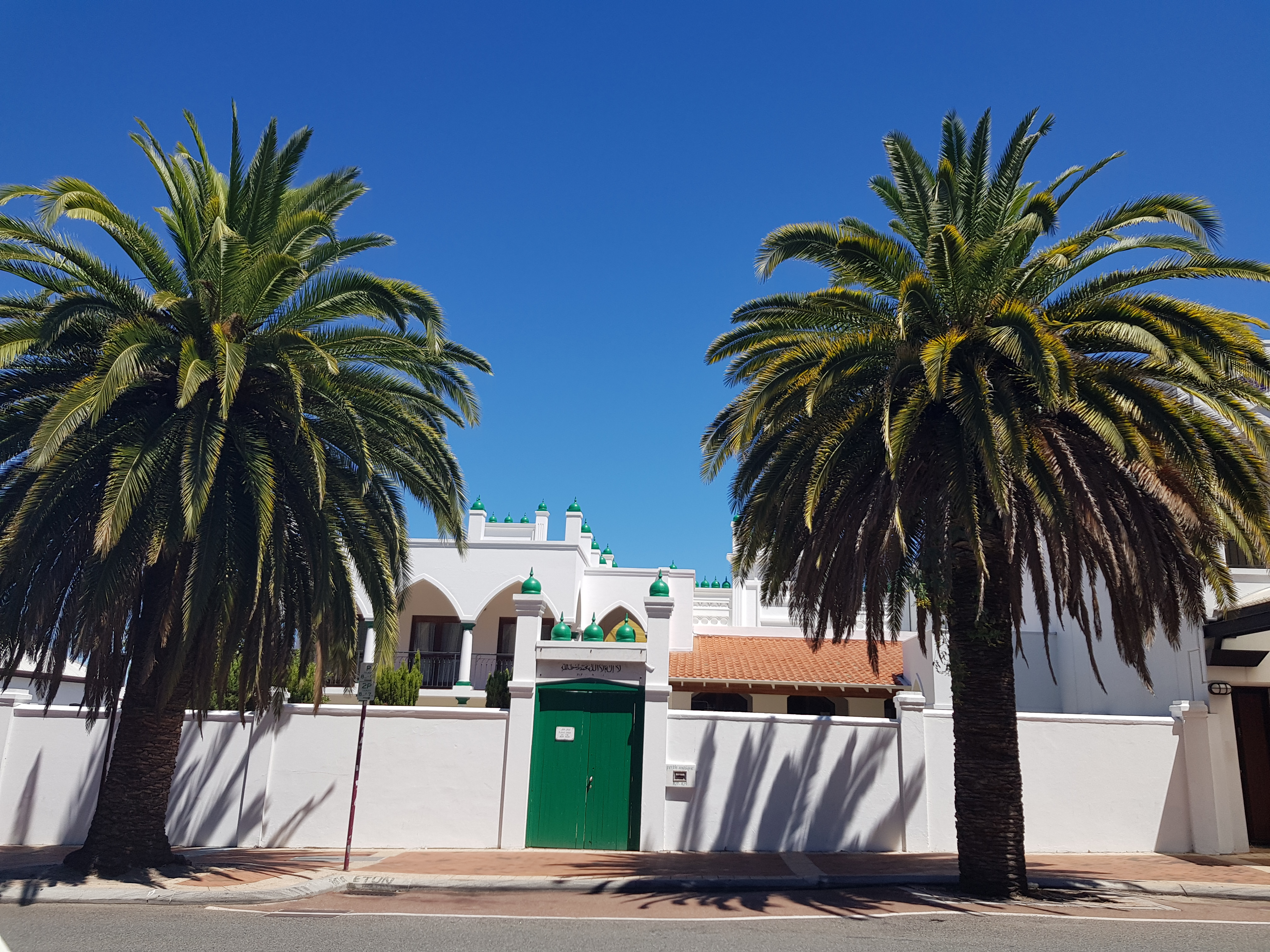

- Location of the mosque in Perth

Religion
- Affiliation: Islam
- Ecclesiastical or organisational status: Mosque
- Status: Active

Location
- Location: 427 William Street, Perth, Western Australia
- Country: Australia
- Coordinates: 31°56′37″S 115°51′45″E

Architecture
- Architect: Din Mohammed
- Type: Mosque architecture
- Groundbreaking: 1905; 121 years ago
- Completed: 1906; 120 years ago
- Direction of façade: East

Western Australia Heritage Register
- Type: Heritage Listed Place
- Designated: 13 November 1995
- Reference no.: 2156

Perth Mosque, located in Perth, Western Australia is the oldest mosque in Perth and the second oldest purpose-built mosque in Australia.

== History ==
The mosque was designed and built between 1905 and 1906. Din Mohammed drew up the designs and the plans for the mosque, with John Eliot the supervising architect during its construction. The mosque was founded by Hassan Musa Khan and Khawaja Mohammad Bakhsh in 1906. Prior to the construction of the mosque, Muslims in Perth typically prayed at home or in informal gatherings.

Donations to construct the mosque were collected by Faiz Mahomet from Afghan cameleers and Muslim merchants across Western Australia, while Musa Khan raised funds in Perth. On 13 November 1905, Faiz Mahomet laid the foundation stone for the mosque. Accommodation at the mosque, added after its initial construction, provided refuge for cameleers during their old age.

Fatteh Mohammad Dean, a superintendent for a night-watch company and an immigrant from Punjab, was among the first trustees of the mosque. In 1906, Emir Habibullah Khan of Afghanistan was named trustee of the mosque to resolve tensions within the Perth Muslim communities.

The mosque was originally registered under the name The Mohammedan Mosque, but this was changed to Perth Mosque in June 1951. Additions and renovations have been subsequently made to the original building over time, including in 1979, 1984 and 1997.

In 2020, it was reported that on average 500 people regularly attended prayers on Fridays, with 100 people on average attending through the rest of the week.

== See also ==
- Islam in Australia
- List of mosques in Australia
