= Calvert expedition =

1896 exploring expedition in Australia

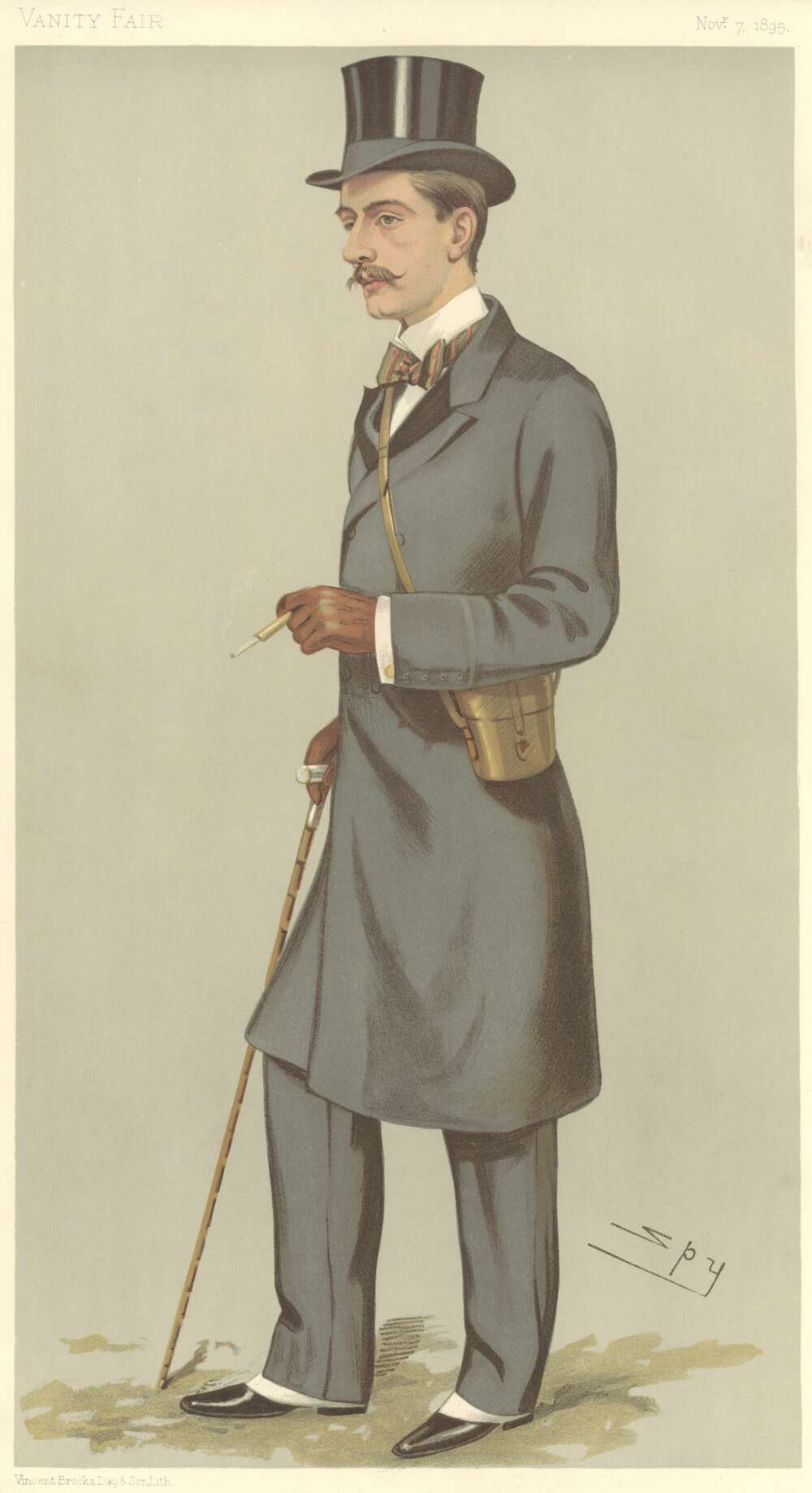
1895 illustration of Albert Calvert published in Vanity Fair

The Calvert Scientific Exploring Expedition took place in central and northern Western Australia in 1896 and 1897, using camels as the principal means of transport.

== Aims and personnel ==
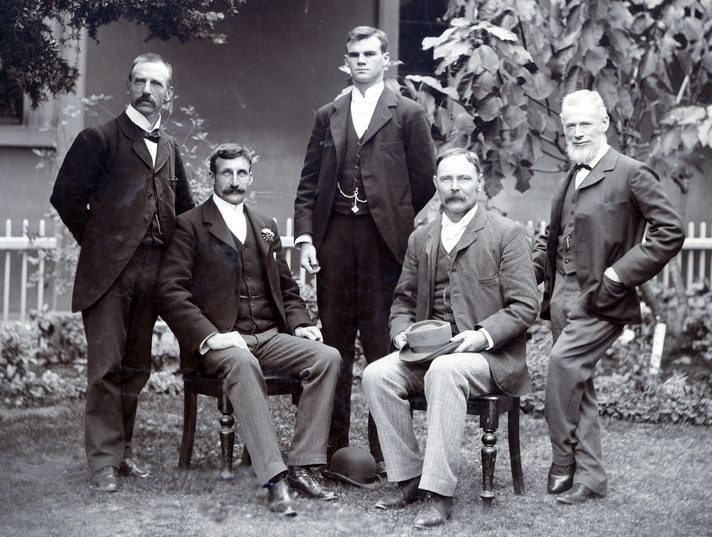
Expedition members. Left to right: A. T. Magarey, L. A. Wells, G. L. Jones, C. F. Wells and G. A. Keartland

The expedition was financed by Albert Frederick Calvert (1872–1946), a London-based mining engineer and author, and conducted under the auspices of the South Australian Branch of the Royal Geographical Society of Australasia. Its main aim was to build on the achievements of the 1891 Elder Expedition in exploring a still largely unknown inland area of Western Australia, mainly in the Great Sandy Desert. Other aims included, as well as the collection of scientific specimens, finding evidence of the fate of the lost Leichhardt expedition of 1848, and opening a stock route between the Northern Territory and the Western Australian goldfields. Expedition personnel included Larry Wells (leader); Charles Wells (his cousin and the second in command); George Jones (mineralogist and photographer); George Keartland (naturalist); James Trainor; with Dervish Bejah and Said Ameer (camel drivers) and 20 camels.

== Expedition ==
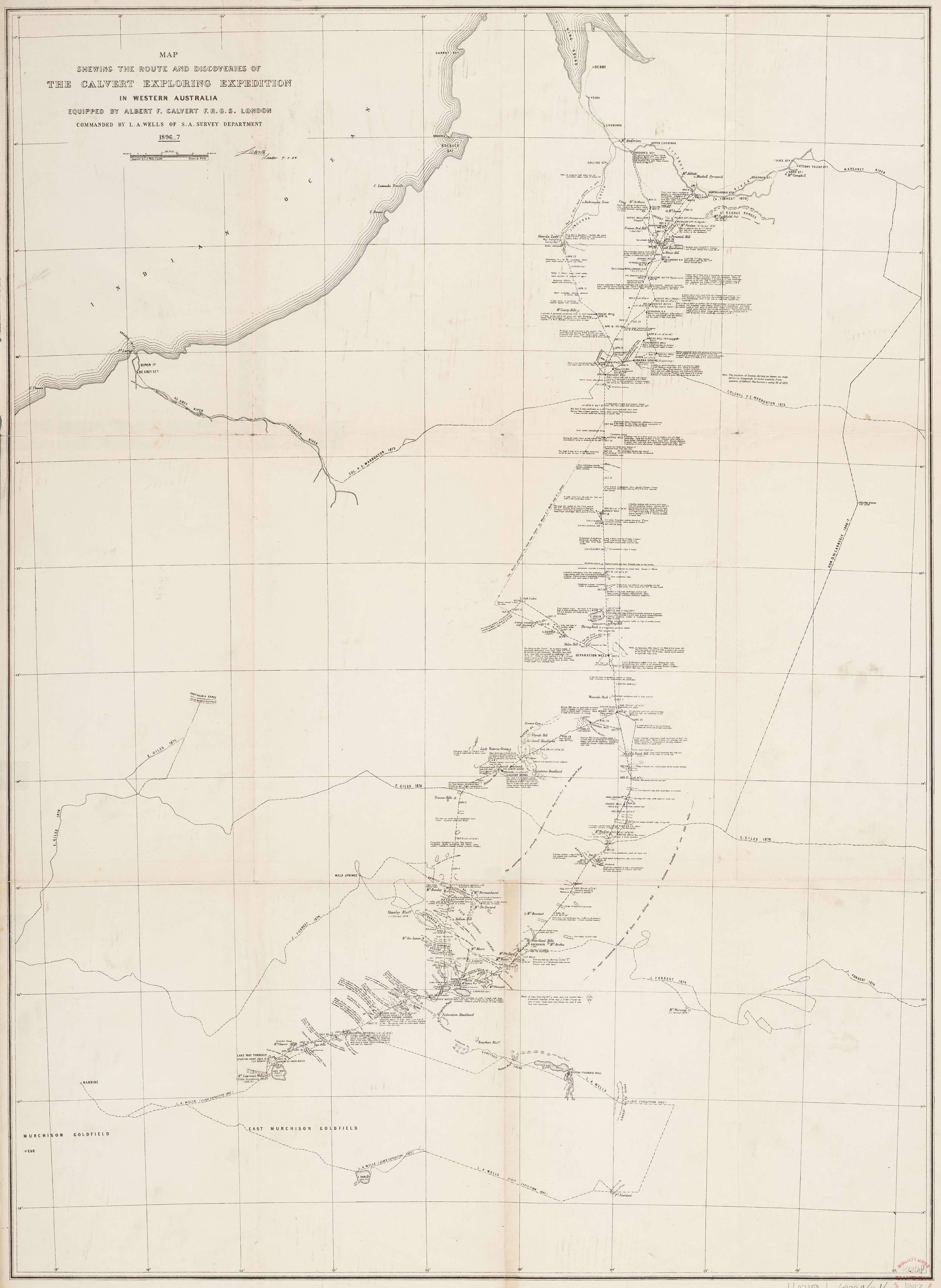
1902 map of the expedition's trajectory

The expedition departed Mullewa in Western Australia on 13 June 1896, heading north towards the Fitzroy River in the West Kimberley. By 21 July, they had reached the limits of previously explored territory and known water supplies. In early August, they were advancing into the Great Sandy Desert and having problems with the availability of water and with camels falling sick through the consumption of poisonous plants. In October, Charles Wells and Jones left to make a side journey towards the north-west, intending to rejoin the others later. On 9 November, the main party reached the track from Derby to the Fitzroy Crossing, and Quanbun Station on 13 November. Concern for the two missing members of the expedition led to a series of search parties, with their mummified bodies eventually being found on 27 May 1897. Jones' diary, found with his body, indicated that they had died from extreme heat and lack of water on about 21 November 1896 while following in the tracks of the main party. The bodies were returned to Adelaide, where a state funeral was held for them on 18 July 1897.

== Aftermath ==
Albert Calvert was unable to meet the full costs of the expedition and the subsequent search parties, with the shortfall made up by the South Australian and Western Australian governments. Larry Wells’ leadership was heavily criticised in the media, though some two years later a Parliamentary select committee cleared him of any blame.

A stained glass window commemorating Wells and Jones was unveiled by the Governor on 27 June 1937 in North Adelaide Congregational Church. The expedition was dramatised in Megan Machin's radio serial Bejah Plants a Date Seed.

== See also ==
- Carnegie expedition of 1896
