= Lawrence Wells =

Lawrence Allen Wells
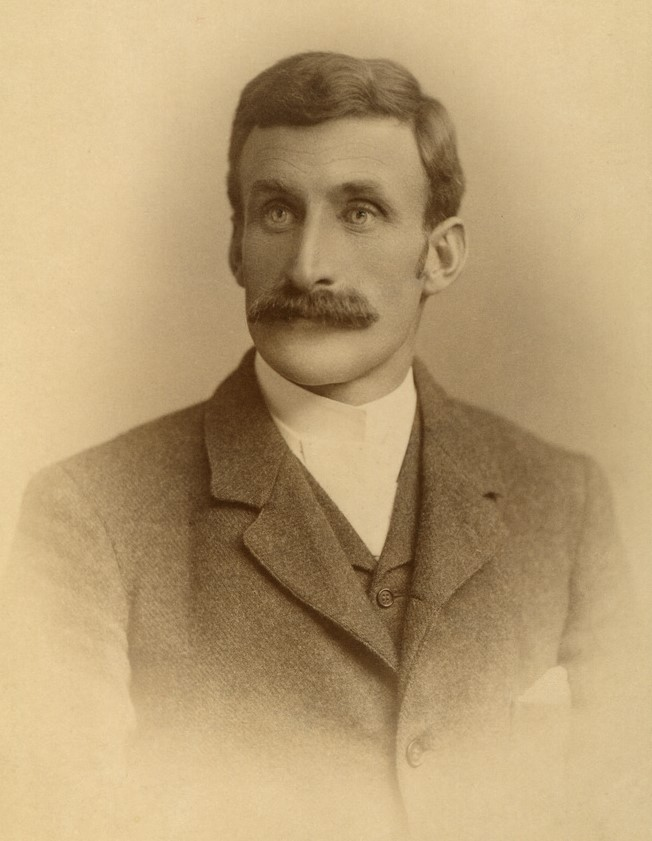
- Born: 30 April 1860; Penola, South Australia, Australia
- Died: 11 May 1938 (aged 78); Adelaide, Australia
- Known for: Australian explorer

Lawrence Allen "Larry" Wells (30 April 1860 – 11 May 1938), frequently spelled Laurence Allen Wells, was an Australian explorer.

Wells was born at Yallum Station near Penola, South Australia and grew up in the Mount Gambier, South Australia district, and after a short stint in a merchants office, joined the South Australian Survey Department in October 1878. In 1883 the surveyor General, G.W. Goyder, offered him the Assistant Surveyor position to the Northern Territory and Queensland Border Survey Expedition, under Augustus Poeppel. This task took almost three years to complete, the honours of driving in the last peg being shared with assistant John Carruthers. and Wells spent the next couple of years working in the far north of S.A. and the N.T., surveying pastoral boundaries.

In 1891 he was appointed surveyor to the Elder Scientific Exploring Expedition, under David Lindsay. Lindsay's instructions were to investigate the remaining "blanks on the map" of Australia, (essentially the Great Victoria, Little Sandy, Great Sandy, Tanami, and the Simpson Deserts. After a good start, the expedition suffered hardship and psychological problems, which saw Lindsay returning to Adelaide to explain the situation, leaving Wells in charge of the remnants of the expedition. It was disbanded in March 1892, after Wells had discovered evidence of gold at what became Wiluna. Only Wells and the cook, Warren, came away with a "clean slate". Returning to the Survey Department, Wells married Alice Marion Woods (14 Feb 1870 – ) on 22 September 1892. Alice was a daughter of noted Adelaide architect E.J. Woods.

In 1896 Albert Calvert, a London mining engineer, proposed through his Adelaide Agent, A.T. Magarey, to finance an expedition to complete the task of the Elder Expedition, again supervised by the South Australian Branch of the Royal Geographical Society of Australasia. Wells was selected to lead the Calvert Exploring Expedition of seven men and twenty camels, which left Lake Way, near present-day Wiluna, on 16 July 1896, and headed northeast into uncharted country.

After a substantial reconnaissance trip, October found the party just over halfway through the two Sandy Deserts, when it was decided that Wells's older cousin Charles Wells (2IC) and George Jones, (the 18 year old nephew of David Lindsay) would make a 'flying trip' to the west, and then rendezvous with the main party at Warburton's Joanna Spring, some 300 km further north. The increasing heat of the advancing summer, lack of feed for the camels, and scant water, caused both parties incredible hardship - the main party was soon only travelling at night, and were forced to abandon virtually everything at Adverse Well, and the remainder the following day. Low on water and unable to locate Joanna Spring, innocently mismapped by Warburton, they made a desperate dash for the Fitzroy River.

Charles Wells and Jones abandoned the flying trip, and following the main party by about twelve days, perished. Their sun dried bodies were finally found on 27 May 1897, 26 km south west of Joanna Spring, after five search expeditions by Larry Wells.

From August 1897, Wells transferred to the Pastoral Board, but from March to September 1903 led the Government North-West Prospecting Expedition. Returning to the Surveyor General's Office, Wells spent three years till September 1908 on a trigonometrical survey in the north west of the N.T.

In 1909 Wells joined the State Taxation Department, and the following year became the Federal Deputy Commissioner of Land Tax for S.A., rejoining the Land Board as chairman in 1918, until his retirement in 1930.

Again pulling on his explorers boots, he led the (private) Quest (1930), Endeavour (1932) and Tarcoola (1933) Expeditions.

Wells was dubbed by J. M. Maughan "the Last Australian Explorer", and though not the only one so called, he did stand out as one who treated Aboriginals with an unprecedented level of humanity.

In 1935 Wells received the Jubilee Medal, and in 1937 the O.B.E.

Wells died after being struck by a rail car near Blackwood Railway Station on 11 May 1938, and was buried at the Mitcham Cemetery.
