= Muslim Council =

Muslim Council may refer to:

== Europe ==
- Central Council of Ex-Muslims, in Germany
- French Council of the Muslim Faith, founded 2003 by Nicolas Sarkozy
- Muslim Council for Cooperation in Europe, based in Strasbourg, France
- Muslim Council of Sweden, founded 1990

== United Kingdom ==
- Muslim Council of Britain, founded 1997
- Sufi Muslim Council, founded 2006

== United States ==
- American Muslim Council, based in Chicago
- Indian American Muslim Council
- Muslim American Public Affairs Council, based in Raleigh, North Carolina
- Muslim Public Affairs Council, based in Los Angeles

== Other places ==
- Muslim Council of NSW, Sydney, Australia
- National Muslim Council of Tanzania
- Supreme Muslim Council, historical body in charge of Muslim community affairs in Palestine under British control

== See also ==
- Australian Federation of Islamic Councils, a Sunni umbrella body for state organisations, including
  - Islamic Council of Queensland, Australia
  - Islamic Council of Victoria, Australia
- Islamic Council Norway
- Islamic Council of Herat, Afghanistan
