= Islamic organisations in Australia =

Islamic organisations in Australia include a wide range of groups and associations run and supported by the Islamic community in Australia. Organisations include major community councils, local organisations, mosques and schools. Most Australian Muslims are Sunni but there is also a Shia minority. There is also a minority Ahmadiyya community.

== Major organisations ==
- Australian Federation of Islamic Councils - The Australian Federation of Islamic Councils (AFIC) (also known as Muslims Australia) was founded in 1964 as an umbrella group for various Islamic groups and councils, and is Australia's most important Islamic organisation. The AFIC sees its role to represent Islam and Muslims of Australia to the Australian government and other bodies nationally and internationally. AFIC coordinates and provides resources for activities of its State Islamic Councils and member Islamic societies.
- Australian National Imams Council - The Australian National Imams Council (ANIC) was formed in 2006 during a meeting of more than 80 imams which had gathered to discuss the crisis created by comments made by Taj El-Din Hilaly. ANIC appoints the Grand Mufti of Australia.
- Darulfatwa – Islamic High Council of Australia - Darulfatwa - Islamic High Council of Australia was established in 2004 as an, "independent and moderate, symbol of hope for Australian Sunni Muslims". It is also known as Darul-Fatwa and provides fatwas. It is based in Bankstown, Sydney.
- Lebanese Muslim Association - The Lebanese Muslim Association is an Australian non-profit welfare organisation based in Lakemba, a south-western suburb of Sydney. The Association was founded in the early 1960s as a community project to service the social, religious, recreational and educational needs of local Muslims. The group operates the Lakemba Mosque which has 5,000 members.

== Minor groups and associations ==
- Crescents of Brisbane - Crescents of Brisbane was formed in 2004 as a community-based organisation promoting healthy lifestyle through sport, entertainment, education and culture, among the Muslim community in Queensland. They publish an e-newsletter on their website called "Crescent Community News" every Friday/Saturday that includes general news about the Muslim community, as well as local events and activities.
- Islamic Community Milli Görüş Australia - Islamic Community Milli Görüş Australia (ICMG) is an Islamic community which comprehensively organises the religious lives of Muslims. The ICMG not only aims at maintaining the Islamic teachings, proclaiming the Islamic creed and communicating religious duties resulting from that proclamation. Other than that the ICMG addresses all issues regarding Muslims while at the same time representing their interests. It is the goal of the ICMG to improve the living circumstances of Muslims as well as to provide for their fundamental rights.
- Islamic Friendship Association of Australia - The Islamic Friendship Association of Australia (IFAA) is an organisation founded by Keysar Trad, a former director of the Lebanese Muslim Association.
- Islamic Information and Services Network of Australasia - The Islamic Information and Services Network of Australasia (IISNA) is an independent Islamic organisation based in Broadmeadows, Melbourne.
- Islamic Museum of Australia - The Islamic Museum of Australia (IMA) is a not-for-profit foundation noted for establishing the first Islamic Museum in Australia. The museum showcases the artistic heritage and historical contributions of Australian Muslims and those from abroad through the display of artwork and historical artefacts.
- Islamic Research and Educational Academy - The Islamic Research and Educational Academy (IREA) is an Islamic dawah organisation based in Hoppers Crossing, Melbourne.
- Islamic Women's Welfare Council - The Islamic Women's Welfare Council of Victoria (IWWC) is a community welfare organisation supporting Islamic women in Victoria. Founded in 1991, the group's director is Joumanah El Matrah. In 2011, the group was renamed to the Australian Muslim Women's Centre for Human Rights (AMWCHR).
- Muslim Aid Australia - Muslim Aid Australia (MAA) is as an Australian-based relief organisation whose main work is humanitarian relief in Muslim countries. Founded in 1989, the organisation is a branch of Muslim Aid UK. The group has raised funds from Australians for the purpose of assisting victims of the 2004 tsunami in South East Asia. The group has been criticised for not providing enough transparency in how funds were distributed.
- Muslim Business Network - The Muslim Business Network (MBN) was established in 2006 with the aim of creating a network for Muslim businesspersons and to advance the business interests of Muslims. The group's presidents include Farouk Adam and Mahomed Khatree.
- Muslim Community Reference Group - The Muslim Community Reference Group was an advisory body to the Australian federal government, set up by the Howard Government, from mid-2005 to mid-2006.
- Muslim Women's Association - The Muslim Women's Association (MWA) was formed in 1983. The executive director is Maha Abdo. The group's president is Joumana Harris. The group initially included many women activists from Lebanon but women from Turkey, Singapore, Egypt and other Muslim countries participated as well. The group received support of the Sheik Taj El Din Hilaly. The group supports women who suffer domestic violence or other forms of abuse at home. The MWA has also established child care centres in local communities. The group supports the Islamic women's magazine Reflections. According to the group's 2013 annual report, the yearly budget for the organisation is approximately $950,000 (AUD).
- Muslim Women's National Network Australia - The Muslim Women's National Network Australia (MWNNA) is a Sydney-based association representing a network of progressive Muslim women's organisations and individual Muslim women. MWNNA runs events and projects for Muslim women across all ethnic backgrounds, and represents their views to media and government organisations. It was founded in 1990 by Aziza Abdel-Halim AM, and Zubeda Raihman is the current President.
- National Zakat Foundation - The National Zakat Foundation is one of a number of Australian Islamic organisations established to distribute Zakat to each of the eight categories of needy Muslims.

== Mosques ==
A listing of the 384 Australian Mosques, Masjids and Musallahs is maintained by Islamiaonline.

== Media ==
- Australasian Muslim Times - The Australasian Muslim Times is a Sunni-based community newspaper presenting news and views using multimedia technologies.
- Muslim Community Radio - The Muslim Community Radio (2MFM) is a community radio station based in Chester Hill, Sydney. It is co-located with Darulfatwa - Islamic High Council of Australia and Salamah College.
- OnePath Network - OnePath Network was established in 2015, "to counter the mainstream media's treatment of Islam in Australia". It is a Sunni-based.

== Schools ==
Islamic schools in Australia are predominantly located in New South Wales and Victoria.

State	School
New South Wales	Islamic Sciences and Research Academy of Australia (ISRA), University and School
New South Wales	Al Kauthar Institute
New South Wales	Al-Faisal College
New South Wales	Unity Grammar College
New South Wales	Al-Noori Muslim Primary School
New South Wales	Qibla College
New South Wales	Al Zahrah College
New South Wales	Arkana College
New South Wales	Australian Islamic College of Sydney (formally King Abdul Aziz College)
New South Wales	Irfan College of Australia
New South Wales	King Abdul Aziz School
New South Wales	Malek Fahd Islamic School
New South Wales	Noor Al Houda Islamic College
New South Wales	Rissalah College
New South Wales	Sule College
Victoria	Al Iman College
Victoria	Al Siraat College
Victoria	Australian International Academy (formerly King Khalid Islamic College)
Victoria	Darul Ulum College
Victoria	East Preston Islamic College
Victoria	Ilim College of Australia
Victoria	Minaret College
Victoria	Werribee Islamic College
Northern Territory	Australian International Islamic College (Darwin campus)
Queensland	Islamic College of Brisbane
Queensland	Australian International Islamic College (Durack, Brisbane, Gold Coast and Logan campus)
South Australia	Islamic College of South Australia
Western Australia	Langford Islamic College
Western Australia	Australian Islamic College
Western Australia	Al-Hidayah Islamic School

== Extremist Islamic groups ==
A number of Australians, from these organisations, have been identified as radicalising youth which in some instances has in resulted in people joining ISIS.

- Ahlus Sunnah Wal Jamaah Association - The Ahlus Sunnah Wal Jamaah Association of Australia (ASWJA) was founded by Melbourne sheik Mohammed Omran. Ahlus Sunnah Wal Jamaah is a generic term referring to Sunni Islam. Those who adopt it as organisational name, do so as adherents of the Wahabi movement.
- Global Islamic Youth Centre - The Global Islamic Youth Centre is an organisation founded by Feiz Mohammad in Liverpool, Sydney. It is linked to the ASWJA. Local residents have opposed the group on the premise that it would seek to spread a fundamentalist form of Islam. Opposition education spokesman Andrew Stoner said the NSW government must closely watch the school and what it may teach, to ensure that it would not teach the "extremist views" and "messages of hate" to young school children.
- Hizb ut-Tahrir - The Hizb ut-Tahrir is a radical Muslim group operating in Australia. The group adheres to a form of Islamic fundamentalism and has been reported calling for Australian Muslims to reject democracy and not to co-operate with Australian law enforcement officers. A speaker associated with the group was criticised for his views on honour killings, leading to a cancellation of one of his talks. An Australian Hizb ut-Tahrir spokesman has, "threatened to make Jews pay with blood". The group has come under scrutiny of the Australian government although no legal action has been taken against it. Columnist, Janet Albrechtsen says, "the young men from Hizb ut-Tahrir are a slippery bunch. They dance around our laws. So let's expose, debate, confront every one of their utterances instead of ignoring them".
- Islamic Youth Movement - The Islamic Youth Movement is an offshoot group of the ASWJA. The group was raided by the ASIO following 11 September 2001. The group runs the Sydney-based online publication of Nida'ul Islam, "The Call of Islam." The publication is noted for releasing a number of interviews with persons associated with Islamic terror groups, including al-Qaeda leader, Osama bin Laden. The group's publication has been criticised for publishing inflammatory material condemning the West, Christianity and Judaism.

== Islamic militant groups ==
A number of small Islamic militant groups have existed in Australia since the 2000s, these groups were believed to have either plotted or carried out acts of terror in Australia.

- "Ahmed Y" group - An Algerian man, known as "Ahmed Y," arrived in Australia in the late 1980s. Ahmed established a small militant group in Australia in 2001 and supported the idea of establishing an Islamic State in Australia and the use of violence against Australians.
- Benbrika group (Melbourne) - A group led by Algerian cleric Abdul Nacer Benbrika in Melbourne was active until Australian police arrested its members in 2005.
- Cheikho group (Sydney) - A group led by Khaled Cheikho was active in Sydney until the Australian police arrested its members in 2005 under Operation Pendennis.
- Lashkar-e-Taiba - The Lashkar-e-Taiba, a proscribed terrorist organisation operating in India and Pakistan, set up a terror cell in Australia. French convert to Islam, Willie Brigitte, accused of planning an attack in Australia, was trained by Lashkar-e-taiba.
- Mantiqi 4 (Jemaah Islamiah) - A short-lived terror cell, known as Mantiqi 4, existed in Australia for several years. The group was sponsored by Jemaah Islamiah (JI), a terrorist group known for their attacks in Indonesia, and was established by Abdul Rahim Ayub, a member of Jemaah Islamiah. Ayub resided in Perth during the late 1990s all while being an active JI member, travelling and attending the group's leadership conferences in Indonesia. In contrast to the Jemaah Islamiah's other cells in Southeast Asia, the Mantiqi 4 cell was less of a focus for the organisation. The activities of the Australian branch of JI included fundraising among the local Indonesian community in Australia. Jemaah Islamiah leadership also expressed intent on identifying targets in Australia to be attacked by Al Qaeda.
- Al-Shabaab - The Al-Shabaab terror group is believed to have been behind the Holsworthy Barracks terror plot.
- Syrian syndicate - A group referred to as the "Syrian syndicate" has been investigated for sending Australian Muslims to fight in the Syrian Civil War. Australian Counterterrorism Police have investigated Wassim Fayad in connection to an attempt to ram an ATM during the 2011 Auburn riots. It is suspected that the funds were to be used in connection to local efforts of involvement in the Syrian conflict.

== Outlawed terrorist organisations ==
As at January 2015, there were 20 organisations designated and banned, by a court or a government department, for active involvement in terrorism. Identification of terrorist organisations may result from a prosecution for a terrorist offence, or from a listing determined by the Attorney-General of Australia.

== See also ==
- Islam in Australia
- Islamic schools and branches
- Education in Australia
- Religion in Australia
