= West Croydon =

West Croydon may refer to:

- West Croydon, South Australia, a suburb of Adelaide
- West Croydon railway station, Adelaide, South Australia
- West Croydon station, Croydon, England

== See also ==
- West Croydon to Wimbledon Line, a former railway line in south London, England
- Croydon West (UK Parliament constituency), used from 1950 to 1955 and since 2024.
