= Salamah College =

Location
- 1/40 Hector Street, Chester Hill, South-western Sydney, New South Wales; Australia; 33°52′35″S 151°00′29″E

Information
- Type: Independent co-educational primary and secondary day school
- Motto: Education. Faith. Discipline
- Denomination: Islamic
- Established: 2012; 14 years ago
- Educational authority: New South Wales Department of Education
- Oversight: Islamic Charity Projects Association
- Principal: Ayman Alwan
- Years: K–12
- Campus type: Suburban
- Colors: Maroon and grey
- Website: www.salamah.nsw.edu.au

Salamah College is an independent Islamic co-educational primary and secondary day school, located in Chester Hill, a suburb of Sydney, New South Wales, Australia. The school motto is Education. Faith. Discipline.

Salamah College commenced its first year of K–8 in 2012. However, after expansions, the school teaches K–12.

The campus features a soccer field, gymnasium and mosque.

The campus has over 700 students in both primary and secondary. The school employs more than 100 staff members.

It is co-located with Darulfatwa – Islamic High Council of Australia and radio station 2MFM.

In June 2016 it was reported that student numbers would increase five-fold, and there were approved plans for $27 million extensions for new classrooms, a childcare centre and a sports centre.

Salamah College is a project developed by the Islamic Charity Projects Association (ICPA). ICPA also founded Al Amanah College in Bankstown and Liverpool.

== See also ==
- Al Amanah College
- Darulfatwa – Islamic High Council of Australia
- Islam in Australia
- Islamic organisations in Australia
- Islamic schools and branches
