= Muslim Community Reference Group =

The Muslim Community Reference Group (MCRG) was an advisory body to the Australian federal government, set up by the Howard government, from mid-2005 to mid-2006. The board served to provide the federal government with proposals on strategies and practices to help integrate the Muslim community and to foster greater understanding towards Muslims among the general society, public institutions and governmental bodies.

== Founding ==
The Muslim Community Reference Group was founded by John Cobb, the former Minister for Citizenship and Multicultural Affairs. The Department of Immigration and Multicultural Affairs (DIMA), under Parliamentary Secretary Andrew Robb, provided secretariat support to the MCRG.

== Board members ==
The following members were listed as members of the MCRG's main board in the group's September 2006 report:

- Ameer Ali, an Australian academic and former President of the Australian Federation of Islamic Councils, an umbrella group for various Islamic groups or councils in Australia, was the appointed chairman of the Australian Muslim Community Reference Group in 2006.
- Dr. Mustapha Kara-Ali served as a member of the MCRG and chaired its Schooling Subgroup. He is a community developer and a former Harvard University scholar who worked on political philosophy and religion. Prior to that he won a Commonwealth Endeavour Award for his PhD on comparative philosophy. In relation to the work of the MCRG, he founded Birr in 2006 as a Government-Community Partnership in Western Sydney.
- Sheikh Taj El-Din Hilaly, Imam of the Lakemba Mosque in Sydney and appointed Mufti of Australia by the Australian Federation of Islamic Councils in 1988, was a member of the board until he was sacked in July 2006 following comments he made in which he denied the Holocaust, calling it a "Zionist lie."
- Aziza Abdel-Halim, President of the Muslim Women's National Network Australia.
- Mohammed Taha Al-Salami, President of the Iraqi Islamic Council of Australia was also among the initial group of Australian Muslim leaders who met with John Howard in 2005.
- Sheikh Fehmi Naji El-Imam
- Nadia Gani
- Amin Hady
- Harry Hage
- Iktimal Hage-Ali
- Kemal Ismen
- Abdul Jalal
- Yasser Soliman
- Malcolm Thomas

=== Others ===
- Zachariah Matthews, an author and public speaker on Islamic topics, former president of the Australian Islamic Mission (AIM) and board member of the Australian Muslim Civil Rights and Advocacy Network (AMCRAN), helped craft the board's public statements.

== See also ==
- Islam in Australia
