= Keysar Trad =

Australian Muslim spokesman

- Born: Lebanon
- Occupations: Founder of the Islamic Friendship Association of Australia, Former president of the Australian Federation of Islamic Councils, Author
- Spouse: Hanifeh
- Children: 9

Keysar Trad is the founder of the Islamic Friendship Association of Australia and is the former president of the Australian Federation of Islamic Councils.

== Background ==
Trad was born in Lebanon and came to Australia at the age of thirteen under the Australian government's family reunion program. He met and married his wife, Hanifeh, when he was in his early twenties. They live in south-west Sydney and have nine children.

After a pilgrimage to Mecca in 1987, Trad decided to become a much stricter Muslim, rather than to follow the more liberal form of Islam that he observed around him in Lebanon and Australia. Trad began to take an active role at the Lakemba Mosque in Sydney shortly thereafter.

== Career ==
Trad is well known for his former role as an interpreter and spokesperson for Sheik Taj El-Din Hilaly.

He is also an author, having released several books.

After leaving the Lebanese Muslim Association, Trad founded his own organisation, the Islamic Friendship Association of Australia Inc (IFAA).

Following the actions of an Australian suicide bomber, who had killed at least five people and injured up to 90, Trad said, "I have always been opposed to suicide bombing. I'm opposed to any form of senseless taking of human life".

Trad has entertained the possibility of becoming a candidate for both the Labor Party and for the Liberal Party. Because of his background Senator Bernardi has raised concerns saying, "Mr Keysar Trad is wholly unsuitable to be a member of parliament".

In July 2016 Trad was elected President of the Australian Federation of Islamic Councils following the standing down of the previous President.

== Defamation case ==
Around the time of the 2005 Cronulla riots, Sydney commercial radio station 2GB broadcast comments by Alan Jones and Jason Morrison on Lebanese Muslims in Sydney. In the aftermath of the Cronulla riots, a rally was held in Hyde Park on 18 December 2005 in the centre of Sydney, attended by some 5,000 people. Keysar Trad attended the rally and spoke about "the suffering of Muslims in Australia" as a result of "predominantly one radio station" which the crowd identified as 2GB. The next day, 2GB ran an 11-minute broadcast with Jason Morrison that included a recording of the rally, as well as a talk back section.

Keysar Trad commenced legal proceedings against Harbour Radio, the operator of 2GB, for alleged defamation during the 11-minute broadcast on 19 December 2005. The plaintiff alleged eight defamatory imputations of comments made in the broadcast under the Defamation Act 1974, and Harbour Radio defended the comments under Sections 15 and 16 of the act which provide a legal defense if "imputation is a matter of substantial truth" and "either relates to a matter of public interest or is published under qualified privilege." Supreme Court justice Peter McClellan ruled against the plaintiff. The claim has gone to the High Court of Australia, and the New South Wales Court of Appeal.

The case against Jason Morrison is one of the longest running cases in recent Australian history, and is believed to have incurred $4 million in legal fees for Harbour Radio, who continued to defend Morrison after he left for a rival station.

In 2015 the matter was resolved by the High Court of Australia and he was forced to pay $290,000 in damages. In a separate case, Trad won a defamation action against the same radio station and was awarded $10,000.

== Controversy ==
Trad is a controversial figure in Australia due to many of his activities, comments and views on matters relating to Islam:

- He once translated some articles for "Nidal ul Islam", the magazine of an Australian-based group called the 'Islamic Youth Movement', of which Bilal Khazal was once a member. The group has since been investigated for alleged terrorism-related offences.
- In 1995 he said, "The criminal dregs of white society colonised this country and...the descendants of these criminal dregs tell us that they are better than us."
- Trad was accused by the mainstream media of supporting "terrorism". They used his refusal to condemn organisations such as Hezbollah as an example, when in fact the only part of Hizbollah banned in Australia is the "Hezbollah External Security Organization". In addition, his frequent criticism of Israel has been used by the media to portray him as anti-Semitic. Moreover, in August 2006, shortly after a ceasefire between Israel and Hezbollah was agreed to in order to end conflict, Trad and Hilaly wrote to the Lebanese Prime Minister, Fouad Siniora, urging him to reject Australian peacekeepers.
- He offended many moderate Muslims, as well as some Australians of Turkish background, when he alleged "Atatürk was in fact an opponent of the practice of Islam" when responding to Australian Treasurer Peter Costello's speech suggesting Atatürk as a model for Muslims.
- Throughout his years as Hilaly's spokesperson, Trad has been heavily criticised - and satirised - for continually defending Hilaly with his insistence that Hilaly has been taken out of context or misunderstood. For example, following the comments made by Hilaly in October 2006 which said that if a woman is raped it is usually her own fault, Trad said that Hilaly was talking about adultery, not rape. Sydney Morning Herald columnist Paul Sheehan accused him of lying.
- In response to comments made about Australians by Sheik Hilaly on Egyptian TV, Trad said some of his comments were "ill advised".
- Trad succeeded in bringing a defamation claim against a Sydney radio station which described him as racist and offensive. A three judge panel in the Court of Appeal found that the Supreme Court Judge did not have a basis for describing Trad racist or offensive. However, the court ordered that only half of Trad's appeal costs be paid as some of the imputations fell under the technicality "reply to attack".
- In 2010, Trad advocated Shari'ah courts for Muslims to deal with matters relating to divorce and inheritance. He has also supported polygamy as an alternative to extramarital relations.
- In 2014 Trad defended boys performing as, "Soldiers of Khilafa" who were chanting the American President should go to hell and calling for the head of the Syrian President. Trad said, rather, they were singing a song about the Syrian revolution.
- In September 2016 Trad said he wanted a second wife, with his current wife who is a year younger than him being supportive.
- In February 2017, in response to a question regarding the meaning of Quran Chapter 4, Surah 34, Trad said a husband can beat his wife, but only as "a last resort". He later apologised for his statements mentioning that Islam does not allow for this by telling the truth that the Quran condemns all violence against women.

== See also ==
- Australian Federation of Islamic Councils
- Islam in Australia
- Islamic organisations in Australia
