= ICQ (disambiguation) =

ICQ May refer to:

- ICQ, an instant messaging software
- International Comet Quarterly (ICQ), a non-profit scientific journal
- Islamic Council of Queensland (ICQ), a community organization in Australia
- Chenzhou West railway station, China Railway telegraph code ICQ
