= Muslim Council of NSW =

Islamic organization based in New South Wales, Australia

- Predecessor: Supreme Islamic Council
- Formation: 2003
- Type: Nonprofit religious body
- Location: Sydney, Australia

The Muslim Council of NSW is or was a not-for-profit organisation based in Sydney, Australia. It was formed in 2003, with the support of 21 Islamic societies; 10 new societies and 11 transferring from the Supreme Islamic Council of NSW. It replaced the Supreme Islamic Council, which had replaced the Islamic Council of NSW, as a member of the Australian Federation of Islamic Councils (AFIC). It represented AFIC in the state of New South Wales.

In May 2006, the council, along with the Islamic Council of Victoria, came into conflict with AFIC, claiming that voting for the AFIC board members had not adhered to its constitution.

Farouk Kassar was the chair in 2003. In 2007 Neil Kadomi occupied the position.

The president was Amjad Mahboob in 2011.
