= Islamic College of Brisbane =

Independent school in Karawatha, Queensland

Coordinates: 27.618731°S 153.092081°E

Information
- Motto: Seek Knowledge
- Religious affiliation: Islamic
- Established: 1995
- Status: Active
- Principal: Ali Kadri
- Teaching staff: 112
- Employees: 195
- Gender: Co-education
- Enrollment: 1,712 (2025)
- Information: Member school of Independent Schools Queensland
- Website: icb.qld.edu.au

The Islamic College of Brisbane (ICB) is an independent, Islamic, co-educational, P-12 school located in the suburb of Karawatha in Brisbane, Australia. In 2025, ICB had an student enrolment of 1,712 and 112 teaching staff. The school serves students from Prep to Year 12, and was the first Muslim school to be opened in Queensland.

== History ==
The school was established on 5 January 1995, and opened on 30 January with the lowest tuition fees of any private school in Queensland at the time. Mohammed Ally was the schools founding principal.

2015 saw the dismissal of college principal Dr. Mubarak Noor: it was suspected that he was let go after he and the school board "disputed a $288,420 withdrawal from the school's bank account" by the Australian Federation of Islamic Councils due to the council not seeking the approval of the school board or chairman prior to authorising the transaction. Even though the principal was let go, "the withdrawal was reversed six weeks later, following Noor's objections."

In 2017, a pig's head was dumped right outside the school with a label of a swastika, and the then acting chair of the school, blamed right-winged politics for stirring up hatred toward the Islamic community.

After the Queensland Government announced the Anti-Discrimination Bill 2024, the school voiced objections, due to the fact that the bill could "stifle religious freedom and inflame "culture wars" within faith-based schools."

== Controversies ==
In 2015, a long-running dispute between the College and the Australian Federation of Islamic Councils, which owns the land, has resulted in members of the school board and principal being dismissed or resigning. The college has been asked to show-cause that it, "complies with registration and accreditation requirements".

In May 2015, it was reported that Queensland Police were investigating a claim made by a former principal that moneys have been removed from school accounts and school loans had been falsified, with possibly up to $1 million involved. A senior officer of the AFIC has been implicated.

In February 2016, it was reported that a federal government audit uncovered that millions of dollars had been improperly passed from school to the Australian Federation of Islamic Councils.

These controversies eventually led to the Australian Government putting the school on notice for breaching the Education Act; if the school did not comply "with financial management and governance requirements" they would cease funding.

== Notable alumni ==
- Yassmin Abdel-Magied

== See also ==
- Australian Federation of Islamic Councils
- Islam in Australia
- Islamic organisations in Australia
- Islamic schools and branches
