= Islamic High Council of Australia =

Islamic organisation based in Australia

Darulfatwa - Islamic High Council of Australia
- Registration no.: 14 740 297 660 (ABN)
- Location: 35 Brancourt Avenue, Bankstown, 2200
- Coordinates: 33.8765°S 151.0081°E
- Website: www.darulfatwa.org.au

Darulfatwa - Islamic High Council of Australia is an Australian organisation of Muslims.

Darulfatwa (also known as Darul-Fatwa or House of Fatwa) provides Fatwas and is associated with a number of Australian Islamic organisations and Muslim schools. including the colocated Salamah College and radio station 2MFM.

In 2005, Prime Minister John Howard commended the Darulfatwa - Islamic High Council of Australia for organising an anti-terrorism forum, "Sunnis against Extremism", which was attended by 200 members of the Islamic community. It has also been congratulated within the New South Wales Legislative Assembly for its role as the leading representative for Muslims in Australia.

== See also ==
- 2MFM
- Islam in Australia
- Islamic organisations in Australia
- Islamic schools and branches
