= Allenby Gardens, South Australia =

Allenby Gardens
- Suburb
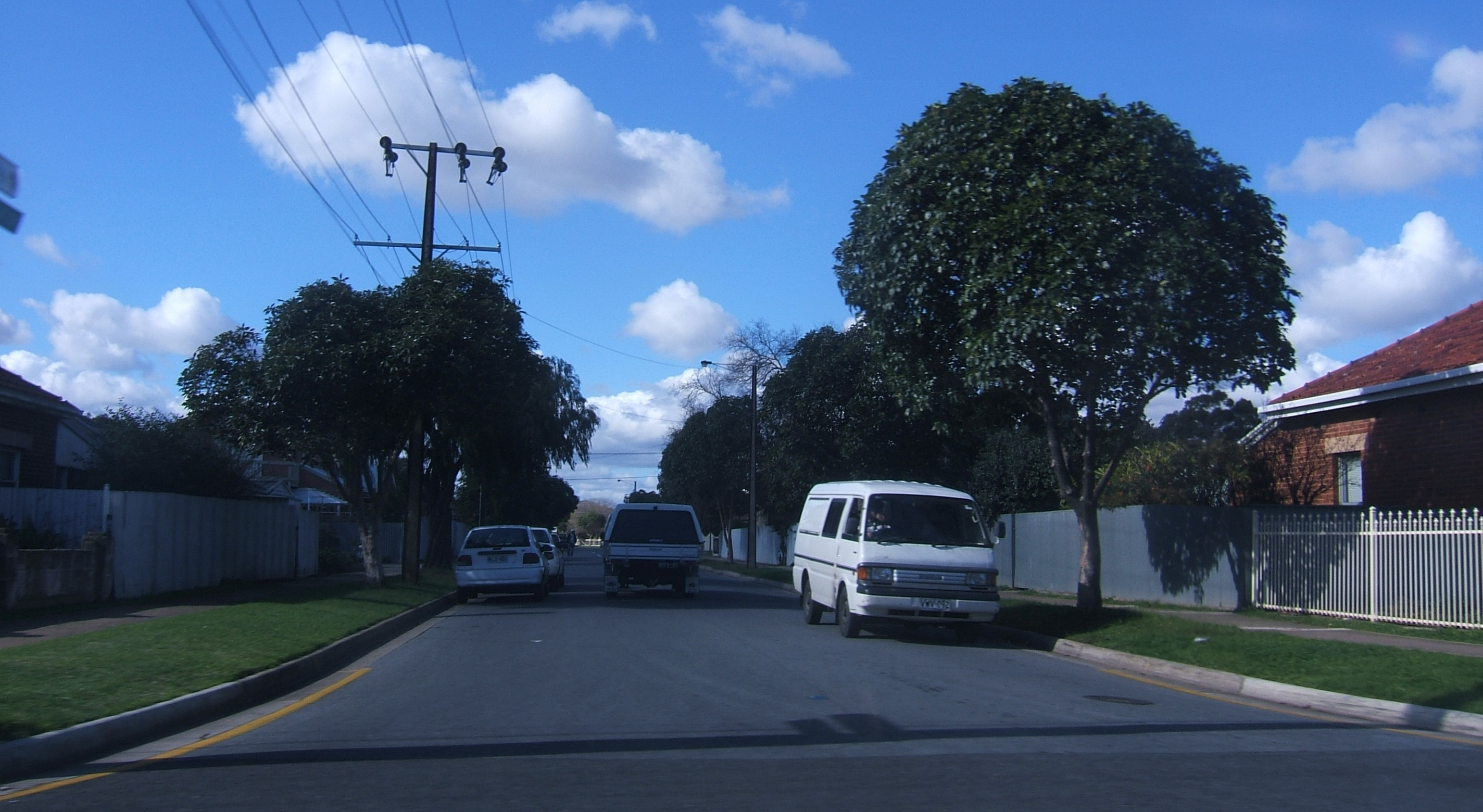
- Street in Allenby Gardens

- Interactive map of Allenby Gardens
- Country: Australia
- State: South Australia
- City: Adelaide
- LGA: City of Charles Sturt
- Location: 4.7 km (2.9 mi) NW of Adelaide city centre
- Established: 1922

Government
  - State electorate: Croydon West Torrens
  - Federal division: Adelaide

Population
  - Total: 2,045 (SAL 2021)
- Postcode: 5009
Suburbs around Allenby Gardens
Beverley	West Croydon	West Croydon
Beverley	Allenby Gardens	Welland
Flinders Park	Torrensville	Torrensville

Allenby Gardens is a western suburb of Adelaide, South Australia. It is located in the City of Charles Sturt.

== History ==
The site was laid out in 1922 by State Town Planner Charles Reade. It was briefly advertised as 'Gallipoli Gardens' (or 'Gallipoli Garden Suburb') before being named 'Allenby Gardens' in honour of the British Field Marshal, Lord Allenby.

The first Allenby Gardens Post Office was renamed West Croydon, South Australia on 1 March 1945; on the same day a new office opened within the present boundaries of the suburb.

== Geography ==
Allenby Gardens is bordered by multiple roads and other points of interest. The suburb itself is separated in two by Grange Road, with the northern end of the suburb being bordered by Port Road and its North-eastern border being East Avenue. The southern end of the suburb is bordered by the River Torrens (Karrawirra Parri) and the Linear Park Trail. The suburb's public transport is serviced by Adelaide Metro.

== Demographics ==
The 2021 Census by the Australian Bureau of Statistics counted 2,045 persons in Allenby Gardens on census night. Of these, 47.7% were male and 52.3% were female.

The majority of residents (71.2%) are of Australian birth, with other common census responses suggesting origins in India (4.3%), Italy (2.7%), Vietnam (2.2%), England (2.1%), and Greece (2.1%). Additionally, people of Aboriginal and/or Torres Strait Islander descent made up 1.1% of the suburb.

The age distribution of Allenby Gardens residents is similar to that of the greater Australian population. 71.4% of residents were over 24 years in 2016, compared to the Australian average of 69.9%; and 28.6% were younger than 24 years, compared to the Australian average of 30.1%.

In terms of religious affiliation, 31.1% attributed themselves to being irreligious, 27.0% of residents attributed themselves to being Catholic, 12.5% attributed themselves to be Eastern Orthodox, and 3.7% attributed themselves to being Anglican. Within Allenby Gardens, 95.6% of the residents were employed, with the remaining 4.4% being unemployed.

== Politics ==
=== Local government ===
Allenby Gardens is part of Beverly Ward in the City of Charles Sturt local government area, with representative councillors, Labor member Matt Mitchell and Independent Edgar Agius.

=== State and federal ===
Allenby Gardens lies in the state electoral district of Croydon and West Torrens and the federal electoral division of Adelaide. The suburb is represented in the South Australian House of Assembly by leader of the South Australian opposition, Labor member Peter Malinauskas (Croydon) as well as Labor Member Tom Koutsantonis (West Torrens), and federally by Steve Georganas.

== Education ==
Allenby Gardens Primary School is located on Barham Street and had been in operation since its establishment in 1926.

== Facilities ==
=== Parks ===
Allenby Gardens main park is the Allenby Gardens reserve, with the smaller River Park reserve servicing the southern end of the suburb.

=== Shopping ===
Allenby Gardens shopping is mainly catered by smaller cafes and boutiques along Grange Road, as well as the Allenby Gardens Shopping Complex also on Grange Road.

== See also ==
- List of Adelaide suburbs
