= Muslim Women's National Network Australia =

Islamic organisation based in Australia

- Abbreviation: MWNNA
- Formation: 1990; 36 years ago
- Founder: Aziza Abdel-Halim
- Headquarters: Australia

Muslim Women's National Network Australia (MWNNA) is an association in Australia which represents a network of progressive Muslim women's organisations and individual Muslim women. MWNNA runs events and projects for Muslim women, and represents their views to media and government organisations.

== History ==
The MWNNA was founded in 1990 by Aziza Abdel-Halim AM and her husband as a community centre to teach English and Arabic. Over time it came to advocate in Australia for Muslim women across all ethnic backgrounds. It is involved with and organises cross-cultural and interfaith events to educate the wider community about Islamic issues. Aziza Abdel-Halim was President, before becoming an Advisor. Silma Ihram is a board member.

The goals of the organisation are:

1. The education of Muslim women and girls to know and appreciate their Islamic rights and duties.
2. Advocacy with government and non-government institutions on behalf of Muslims, especially women and children.
3. Maintaining good relations with Australians of other faiths and joining with them in interfaith meetings and events.
4. Assisting refugees and others in need of help in our society.

== Activities ==
In 2003 the MWNNA developed and implemented a strategy to meet with and educate media executives, journalists, and journalism students to discuss the impacts of negative stereotyping and misreporting in the media, and build relationships between the media and Muslim communities. Training modules and online resources were delivered through a number of universities that taught media, covering controversial topics such as the hijab, Islam, and terrorism.

In 2004 the President of the MWNNA, Aziza Abdel-Halim AM, was member of the Muslim Community Reference Group to provide the federal government with advice on how to help the Muslim community integrate and foster understanding of Muslims amongst Australian society, public institutions and government bodies.

In the lead up to the 2004 federal election and the 2007 federal election, the MWNNA ran "Learn To Lobby Your Polly" workshops and "How To Vote" seminars to educate Muslims about voting in Australia and raise their awareness of the Australian political process.

In 2006 MWNNA members contributed to the Muslim Women's Project run by the Human Rights and Equal Opportunity Commission. The Muslim Women's Project was created in response to the findings from the 2004 Islamic Report, which found that it was women who were most affected by racial and religious discrimination, to engage with Muslim Women about human rights and responsibilities.

In 2008 the MWNNA gained a $99,991 grant from the Federal Government for the purpose of helping "Australian Muslim women develop self-esteem and overcome discrimination.

In 2008 MWNNA published a book entitled Did You Know: Refuting Interpretations Concerning The Position of Women in Islam, and Muslim's interaction with non-Muslims, written by Aziza Abdel-Halim AM, and funded by the Department of Immigration and Citizenship as part of the National Action Plan to Build on Social Cohesion, Harmony and Security. The book aims to address the misinterpretation and misapplication of Islam as it affects the role, position and rights of Muslim Australian women.

MWNNA spokeswomen are sometimes quoted in the media discussing controversial subjects alongside other Australian Muslim community leaders from organisations such as the Islamic Women's Welfare Council of Victoria, Islamic Council of Victoria and the Iraqi Islamic Council of Australia. For example, MWNNA spoke out against a Muslim cleric who blamed women wearing "immodest dress" for rape; against domestic violence in the Muslim community; discussed Australian Muslim women's "cultural" rather than "religious" choice to wear or not wear the niqab and burqa when Senator Cory Bernadi wanted them banned; recommended increased vetting and accreditation of imams to ensure they understand Australian law and society, particularly non-violence and women's equality; and criticised the introduction of the Federal Government's anti-terrorism laws, which allow surveillance and indefinite detention of citizens without needing any proof of guilt or charge.

The MWNNA was one of 19 national women's organisations within the Australian Women's Coalition (AWC). The AWC was one of four alliances funded by the Federal Office for Women.

== See also ==
- Islam in Australia
- Muslim Community Reference Group
- Aziza Abdel-Halim
