= Welland, South Australia =

Welland
- Suburb
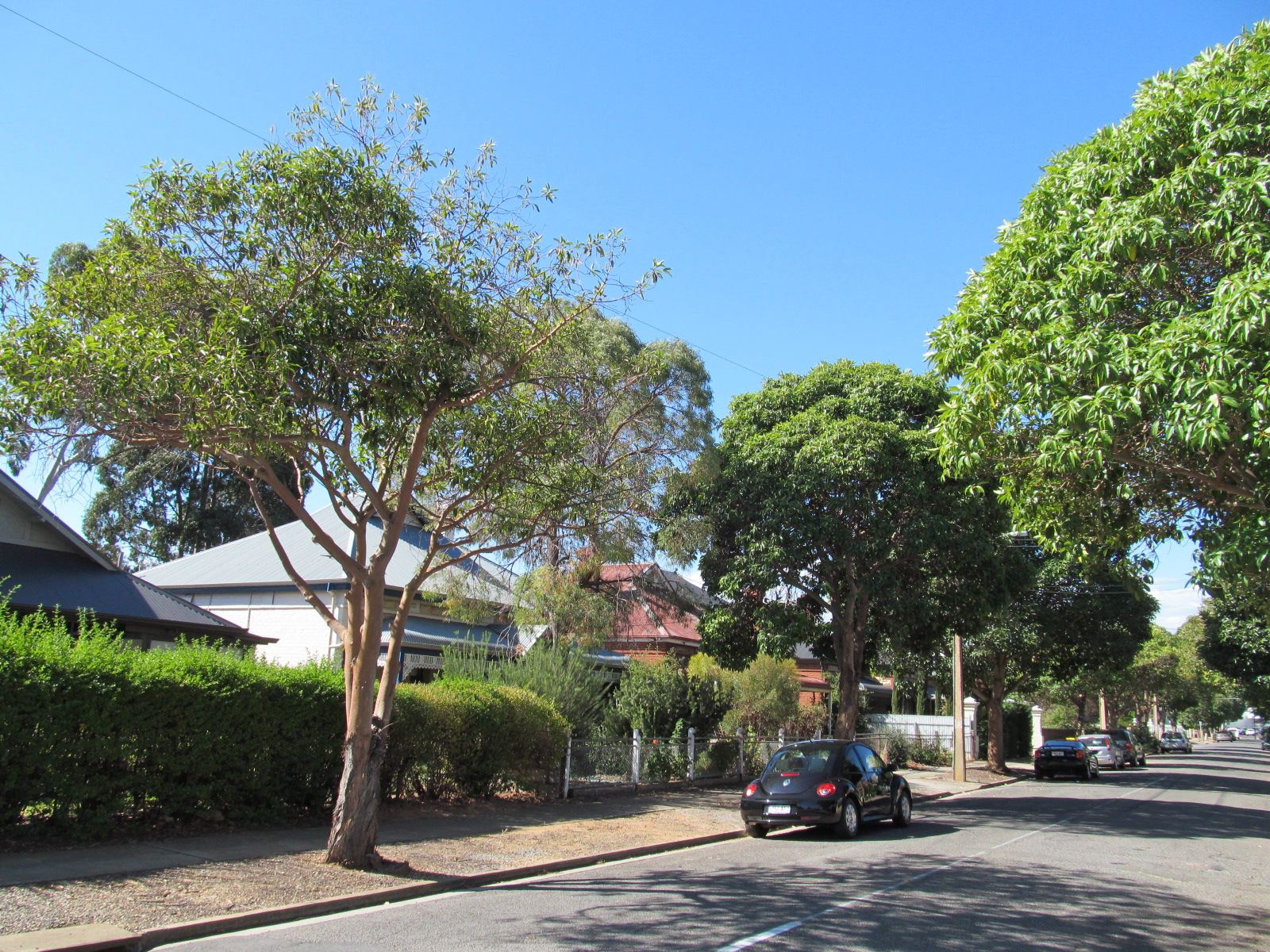
- Houses on Welland Avenue

- Interactive map of Welland
- Country: Australia
- State: South Australia
- City: Adelaide
- LGA: City of Charles Sturt
- Location: 5 km (3.1 mi) from Adelaide

Government
  - State electorate: Croydon West Torrens
  - Federal division: Adelaide

Population
  - Total: 881 (SAL 2021)
- Postcode: 5007
Suburbs around Welland
| West Croydon | West Croydon | Croydon |
| Allenby Gardens | Welland | West Hindmarsh |
| Torrensville | Torrensville | Thebarton |

Welland is an inner suburb of Adelaide in the City of Charles Sturt local government area. It is around 5 km west northwest of the city centre. It was named for Welland, Worcestershire in 1907.

== History ==
Welland Post Office opened on 3 October 1921. For much of the twentieth century, Welland and surrounding suburbs were known for the brickmaking industry located near the Torrens River, memorialised today by the large remnant kiln chimney at the Brickworks Marketplace (formerly Brickworks markets) in the extreme north east of Torrensville. In 1923 severe flooding of the Welland brick fields by the Torrens River forced some of the industry to move further west and downstream into Beverley and Allenby Gardens.

== Geography ==
Welland is small, long suburb bordered by multiple roads and the River Torrens (Karrawirra Parri), with the Linear Park Trail. The suburb itself is separated in two by Grange Road, with the northern end of the suburb being bordered by Port Road. The suburb's public transport is serviced by Adelaide Metro.

== Demographics ==
The 2016 Census by the Australian Bureau of Statistics counted 866 persons in Welland on census night. Of these, 49.7% were male and 50.3% were female. This increased to 881 persons in the 2021 census, of which 46.1% were male and 53.9% were female.

As of 2021, the majority of residents (67.8%) are of Australian birth, with other common census responses being Greece (4.9%), Italy (3.9%), India (3.2%), England (1.8%), and Scotland (1.2%). Additionally, people of Aboriginal and/or Torres Strait Islander descent made up 1.1% of the suburb.

The age distribution of Welland residents is similar to that of the greater Australian population. 71.5% of residents were over 24 years in 2016, compared to the Australian average of 68.5%; and 28.7% were younger than 24 years, compared to the Australian average of 31.5%.

In terms of religious affiliation, 34% of residents attributed themselves to being of no religion, 26.2% of residents attributed themselves to being Catholic, 18.2% attributed themselves to be Eastern Orthodox, and 2.7% attributed themselves to being Buddhist. Within Welland, 5.6% of residents stated they are unemployed.

== Politics ==
=== Local government ===
Welland is part of Beverly Ward in the City of Charles Sturt local government area, with representative councillors, Labor member Matt Mitchell and Independent Edgar Agius.

=== State and federal ===
Welland lies in the state electoral district of Croydon and West Torrens and the federal electoral division of Adelaide. The suburb is represented in the South Australian House of Assembly by leader of the South Australian opposition, Labor member Peter Malinauskas (Croydon) as well as Labor Member Tom Koutsantonis (West Torrens), and federally by Steve Georganas.

== Education ==
Welland itself contains no schools or education facilities, however there is Allenby Gardens Primary School is located on Barham Street.

== Facilities ==
=== Shopping ===
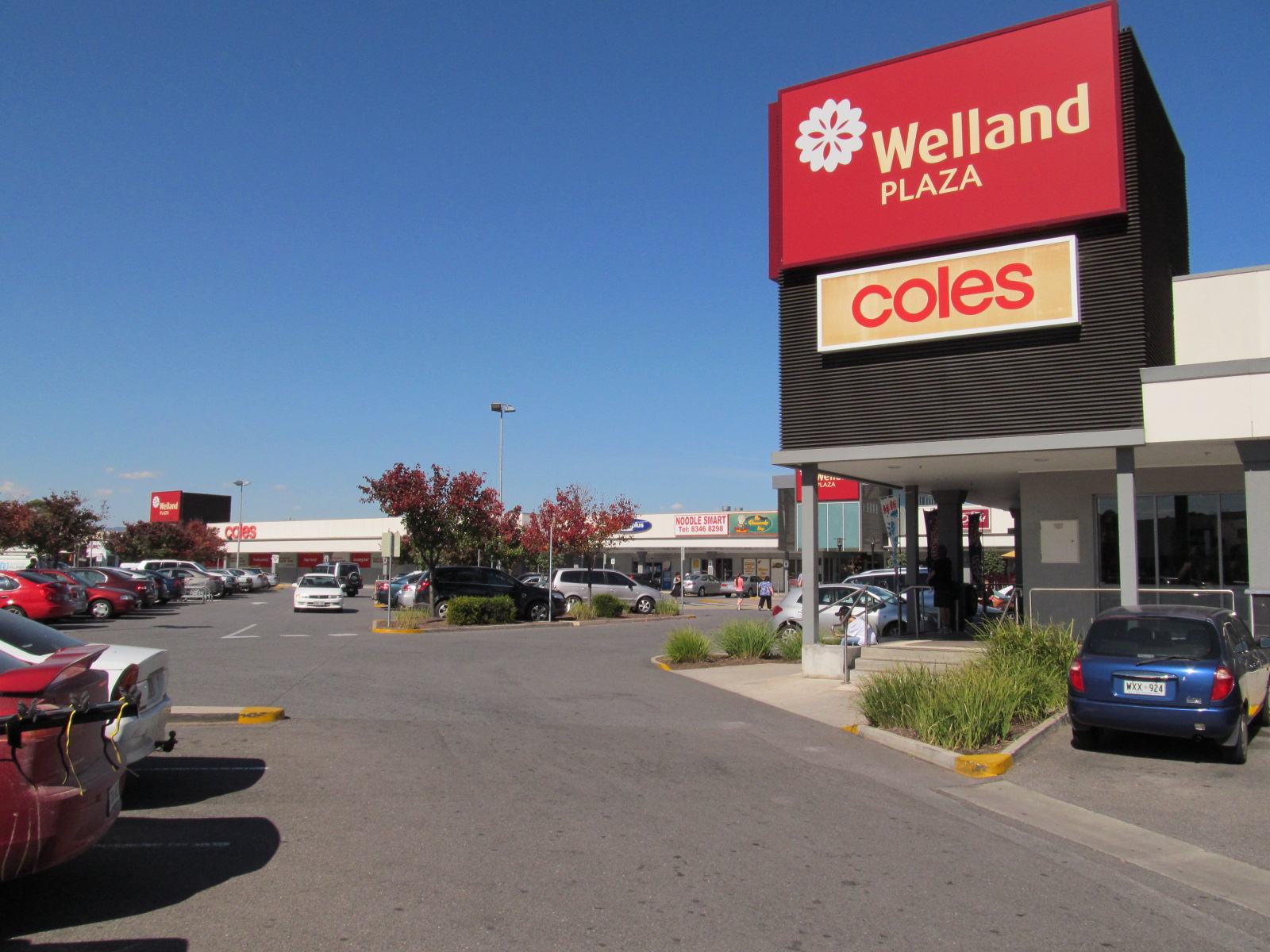
Welland Plaza Outside

Welland shopping is mainly serviced through Welland Shopping Centre, which contains a Coles Supermarket, multiple cafes and restaurants and other miscellaneous shops. Additionally, Welland also contains a few other shopping complexes which are situated upon Grange Road.
