= Feiz Mohammad =

Australian Muslim preacher

- Born: 1970 (age 55–56); Sydney, Australia

Feiz Mohammad (born 1970) is an Australian Muslim preacher.

== Biography ==
Mohammad is of Lebanese origin, and was born in Sydney, in 1970. After quitting school at year 10 to learn carpet laying, he took an interest in boxing, where he became the NSW amateur welterweight champion in 1987, and in bodybuilding, winning the national under-19 bodybuilding title in 1989. At the age of 19 he began explore world religions, studying Christianity, Buddhism and Judaism before finally choosing Islam.

Mohammad studied under Sheikh Mohammed Omran, the spiritual leader of Ahlus Sunnah Wal Jam'ah Association of Australia, who sent him, in 1990, to Saudi Arabia's Islamic University of Madinah, where he spent four years studying Islamic law. He returned to Australia in 1997.

Mohammad fled to Tripoli, Lebanon, in November 2005 and was believed to have lived there from 2007 through at least December 2008. He relocated to Malaysia to continue Islamic studies, aiming for a PhD in Sharia, and returned to Australia, likely in 2010, to open a new prayer hall in Auburn.

In March 2011, Mohammad returned to Australia after a six-year absence. He established the Dawah Central centre in Auburn (now the Ahlus Sunnah Wal Jam'ah Association of Australia Auburn). It has a number of other locations in Sydney and elsewhere in Australia. He is associated with and supported by the Islamic organization Ahlus Sunnah Wal Jam'ah Association of Australia, and has delivered sermons at their centre in Auburn. His last known residence as of September 2012 was in the Southern Highlands.

=== Global Islamic Youth Centre ===
In Australia, Mohammad and others founded the Global Islamic Youth Centre in the Sydney suburb of Liverpool in 2000 to "cater for the physical, social, educational and religious needs, especially for the youth and the children, in accordance with the teachings of the Quran". He was its head in 2005, and in 2008 was still active at the centre. Even after he left Australia for Lebanon, he continued to direct the centre from abroad.

As of December 2008, the Global Islamic Youth Centre had raised $700,000 towards a new facility in Liverpool. A Centre spokesman said that the centre was "for all those kids out there who are lost," and would "encourage them to try to follow the right path."

== Controversy ==
=== Death Series DVD lectures ===
In 2007, a box set of 16 DVDs of Mohammed's sermons, called the Death Series, became a focus of attention of the Attorney-General of Australia. The DVDs urge young Muslims to kill infidel non-believers and sacrifice their lives for Allah. It says the children should be taught that there is "nothing more beloved to me than wanting to die as a Muhajid [holy warrior]," and that the parents should "put in their soft, tender heart the zeal of jihad and the love of martyrdom", preach jihad. He said: "Kafir (disbeliever) is the worst word ever written, a sign of infidelity, disbelief, filth, a sign of dirt". He also calls Jews "pigs," and laughs about killing them, as he makes snorting noises.

The DVDs came to public attention when they were featured in the documentary Undercover Mosque, which aired on Britain's Channel 4. The DVDs were being sold by children in the parking lot of a Birmingham mosque.

The Australian Federal Police and Australia's Attorney-General investigated whether Mohammed's sermons broke laws against sedition, racial vilification, and inciting violence and terrorism. In January 2007, two Australian Federal Police raided the Global Islamic Youth Centre and removed copies of the Death Series DVD set from the premises. Australian Acting Attorney-General Kevin Andrews called the DVDs "offensive, unacceptable and outrageous" and "importations of hatred". NSW Premier Morris Iemma said the DVD preachings were "reprehensible and offensive" and that "The sort of incitement that the DVD encourages is incitement to acts of violence and acts of terror." The Opposition called for him to be charged with inciting terrorism, and Federal Opposition leader Kevin Rudd said the comments were obscene and an incitement to terrorism, and that he wanted the government to act, and that Mohammad "has no place in our society". "I would say this to Sheik Mohammed: Do not return to Australia, you are not welcome here," said Rudd.

In July 2007, federal Attorney-General Philip Ruddock, referring to the DVDs, said that Australia needed better laws to deal with items that encourage people to commit terrorist attacks, and that "Waiting for a terrorist attack to happen is unacceptable." He added: "People who may be susceptible to carrying out a terrorist act ought not to be instructed in how to do it, how to use household products to produce a bomb, or be encouraged to think about violent jihad and taking their own life."

Vic Alhadeff, the NSW Jewish Board of Deputies CEO, said "He has a significant number of followers and ... it is inevitable that there will be some who will be influenced by these grotesque remarks." Opposition education spokesman Andrew Stoner said the NSW government must ensure that his Global Islamic Youth Centre would not teach the "extremist views" and "messages of hate" of Mohammad to young school children.

=== Other lectures ===
He said:

"Jews are pigs that will be killed at the end of the world". He also said concerning Jews, "They have got the most extreme racial pride in them. They say that every single non-Jew is a slave created to serve the Jews ... Their time will come like every other evil person's time will come."

In late 2008, a site he created called Faith Over Fear had links to the centre. Its primary video showed Mohammad calling on Muslims to sacrifice their lives to wage war against the West.

Mohammed later apologized in an interview for referring to Jews as pigs, and said that his reference to jihad was misunderstood. In September 2012, speaking of his record controversial statements, Mohammad said: "So, not that I retract what I have said in the past, but I now am wiser than I was in the past."

=== Call for beheading of Geert Wilders ===
In an internet chat room, Mohammad incited Muslim followers to behead Dutch politician Geert Wilders, it became known in September 2010. His rationale was his accusation that Wilders had "denigrat[ed]" Islam, and that anyone who "mocks, laughs or degrades Islam" as Wilders had must be killed "by chopping off his head". The Dutch newspaper De Telegraaf released an excerpt of the talk, after Dutch intelligence officials received a tip about the threat. Sheikh Fedaa Majzoub, the vice president of the NSW branch of the National Imams Council, said that the comments were "completely rejected by us as Islamic authorities". Sheikh Taj el-Din al Hilaly, former mufti of Australia and imam of the Lakemba mosque, also spoke out against the remarks.

After the 2013 Boston Marathon bombing, Wilders wrote:

Three years ago, Feiz Mohammed issued an internet video in which he called for my beheading. I was, he said, "evil filth". "Chop his head off," he told his followers. I am threatened for the simple reason that I am an Islam critic. But, make no mistake, I am not the only one who is in danger. The Tsarnaev brothers drew inspiration from Feiz Mohammed's internet rants and decided to kill innocent onlookers at a marathon. Everyone is in danger.

=== Denouncement by Taj El-Din Hilaly ===
In March 2011, Australia's most senior Islamic leader, Imam Sheikh Taj El-Din Hilaly of Australia's largest mosque at Lakemba, denounced Feiz Mohammad. He called Feiz Mohammad dangerous, and insisted that he be banned from delivering sermons to young Muslims. He said his preaching "can lead young people to move away from their family and community [and] to distance and isolate themselves." He added, "If religion had something like the Australian Medical Association, or a trade authority, they would not allow him to be preaching, they wouldn't give him a licence ... I haven't seen a change in him."

Feiz Mohammad had responded to requests from Australian authorities to remove videos by al-Qa'ida spiritual leader Anwar al-Awlaki from his website.

== Denied connection with Boston marathon bombing suspects ==
It was reported in April 2013 that Tamerlan Tsarnaev, a suspect in the Boston Marathon bombing, had a YouTube page that included four of Feiz Mohammad's videos. Mohammad volunteered to NSW police that he had no connection with the suspects. Attorney-General of Australia Mark Dreyfus said that Mohammad "condemned the use of violence" and has "changed his attitude", supporting a community program to prevent the radicalisation of Australian youth. Dutch politician Geert Wilders wrote: "Dreyfus has great faith in the conversion of the hate-preacher. But I do not share this optimism.... I have not heard the sheik recall his demand for my beheading. Nor did the Tsarnaev brothers hear Sheik Mohammed declare that the Islam he preached earlier is not the true Islam." Professor Clive Williams, who teaches at Macquarie University's Centre for Policing, Intelligence and Counter Terrorism, believes Mohammad's extremist videos should be taken off the internet.

== See also ==
- Ahlus Sunnah Wal Jamaah Association (Australia)
- Islam in Australia
- Islamic organisations in Australia
- Islamic schools and branches
- Mohammed Omran
