= Muslim Women Australia =

Islamic organization based in Australia

Muslim Women Australia (MWA) is an Australian organisation formed in 1983. The executive director is Maha Abdo. The group's president is Joumana Harris. The group initially included many women activists from Lebanon, but women from Turkey, Singapore, Egypt and other Muslim countries participated as well. The group received support of the Sheik Taj El Din Hilaly. The group supports women who suffer domestic violence or other forms of abuse at home. The MWA has also established child care centres in local communities. The group supports the Islamic women's magazine Reflections.

According to the group's 2013 annual report, the yearly budget for the organisation is approximately $950,000 (AUD).

The MWA operates a refuge home for Muslim women seeking refuge from domestic violence.

== See also ==
- Islam in Australia
  - Islamic organisations in Australia
