= Jason Morrison (radio broadcaster) =

Australian radio broadcaster

- Occupations: Talkback radio broadcaster TV personality
- Spouse: Heidi Tiltins
- Website: jasonmorrison.com.au (2016 archive)

Jason Morrison is a conservative Australian talk radio presenter and newspaper columnist.

== History ==
Morrison was born in 1971 and raised in Hornsby, a suburb of Sydney's North. He went to St. Leo's College at Wahroonga and is Catholic.

He trained at 2GB in a journalism cadetship programme in 1990 and later qualified at the Australian Film Television and Radio School.

Morrison has spoken of working for Dick Smith Electronics as a salesman while working in radio to boost his income.

He studied Electrical Engineering and Law at University but did not complete the degree.

== Career ==
=== 2GB ===
Morrison's media career started with 2GB in 1989 at the age of 17 as a newsroom cadet and he has subsequently covered news and current affairs in all parts of the country and around the world. In 1998, Morrison was appointed Director of News at 2GB and remains the youngest person to have ever held that position.

Between 2008 and 2010, Morrison presented the Drivetime afternoon shift where he consistently held second-place in the market but never broke to number one. He was the regular alternate for Alan Jones for several years and during an extended stint in Jones' breakfast shift actually out-rated him. Morrison told the Sydney Morning Herald at the time "it was luck and anyone who thinks otherwise is kidding themselves". Jones later remarked "I'm not surprised, Jason is hugely talented and one day I won't be here so it's in good hands".

In December 2010, Morrison announced that he would be leaving his position at 2GB as host of Drive and move to rival 2UE. It was speculated that he had a falling out with fellow presenter Ray Hadley which Morrison denied, "Ray is just being competitive about me leaving. What do you expect him to say, tune in and listen to him. We actually got on fine".

=== 2UE ===
After three years at 2UE, Jason's contract was terminated at the end of 2013, after allegedly being told his conservative views and style did not fit with the future ideological direction of the Fairfax Media owned radio station. The decision was considered a shock and prompted wide discussion in the media, including by direct rival Ben Fordham who said "2UE has rocks in their heads for getting rid of Morrison". Fordham immediately offered Morrison a segment on his show which he accepted.

It was reported Morrison was sanctioned for criticising the board of Fairfax for refusing to allow Gina Rinehart to take up a board position, even though she was the largest single shareholder. The remarks reportedly resulted in legal action against Morrison which was later dropped.

It was reported Morrison fell out with 2UE management after siding with controversial presenter Michael Smith who left the station after being prevented from broadcasting allegations about Julia Gillard's associations with the Australian Workers Union.

=== Television ===
Morrison was chief of staff at the Sydney newsroom of Network Ten for five years from 2000. He was promoted to Editor but left a year later to return to radio.

He regularly appears in short opinion slots of various national morning television shows including Sunrise. He is a regular panelist on Paul Murray Live on Sky News Live.

In October 2015, Morrison was appointed news director of Seven News Sydney replacing Chris Willis. He left the position in June 2023, handing the role over to Neil Warren.

=== Other ===
In 2014, Morrison began working as an advisor to Australia's richest person Gina Rinehart. Morrison also attempted to gain pre-selection to run as a Liberal Party candidate for the safe seat of Ku-ring-gai ahead of the 2015 NSW state election, but was unsuccessful.

== Controversy ==
=== Wins long running defamation case ===
In 2005 while broadcasting on 2GB, Morrison described Sydney Islamic activist Keysar Trad as a "gutless and a disgraceful and dangerous individual who incited racism and violence". Trad sued Morrison for defamation. Morrison and 2GB stood by the remarks. Morrison further described Trad as "typical of people who run around smearing others and the moment they are criticised, run to the courts". The case was won by Morrison and 2GB and described in the media as Australia's longest running defamation case after it went to the NSW Supreme Court, the NSW Court of Appeal, and the High Court of Australia. Trad was ordered to pay more than $500,000 in costs.

=== Al Jazeera ===
In 2015, Morrison made international news when he told a leading British Islamic scholar he was "unfit for civilised society. You are uncivilised" during a televised debate on Al Jazeera. The exchange took place during a debate about freedom of the press following the terrorist attack on Charlie Hebdo magazine. Morrison argued that people who thought the publishers had brought the attack on themselves: "So, please, spare me the justification garbage for these terrorists being upset and just responding to provocation. If you think they were even slightly justified for killing people who drew some pictures, then I'm afraid you are over in their column."

== Awards ==
In 2007, Morrison received the Brian White Memorial award recognising sustained journalistic achievement. In 2009 he again received the same award, the only time it has been awarded to the same person twice.

== Personal life ==
Morrison is married and lives in Beecroft, New South Wales. He has three children.

He joined the staff of the Sydney Daily Telegraph in December 2013 as a columnist. Morrison has been a contributor to New Zealand radio station Radio Live, along with TV-radio hybrid shows Paul Henry and The AM Show.

He is a founding director of the medical charity Biaggio Signorelli Foundation.

He holds an amateur radio licence and has built the studios of two community radio stations as a hobby.
