= Australian Federation of Islamic Councils =

Association of Sunni Muslims

- Formation: 1 January 1964; 62 years ago
- Registration no.: (ABN) 37 002 757 155
- Location: Sydney
- Region served: Australia
- President: Dr Rateb Jneid
- Budget: $65 million (2017)
- Website: afic.com.au

The Australian Federation of Islamic Councils (AFIC), founded in 1964 as Australian Federation of Islamic Societies (AFIS) and also known as Muslims Australia, is a not-for-profit umbrella organisation to represent Sunni Muslims across Australia.

It is not to be confused with the Australian National Imams Council, which also appoints its own Grand Mufti of Australia.

== History ==
A two-tier organisation called the Australian Federation of Islamic Societies (AFIS) was founded in 1964. In 1976 it changed to a three-tier structure and changed its name to the It has also been referred to as Muslims Australia, and the Muslims Australia Executive Committee oversees the administration of the organisation.

== Membership ==
The main role of AFIC is to represent and of Australia as one "Ummah" to the government and other bodies nationally and internationally. AFIC coordinates and provides resources for activities of its State Islamic Councils and member Sunni Islamic societies.

The definition of Muslim according to AFIC member organisation, the Islamic Council of Western Australia, is "any person who conforms to the teachings of the Qur'an and Ahli Sunnah and Jamma' and shall specifically exclude any person or organisation, professing adherence to the Ahmadi, Lahori, Qadiani or Baháʼí schools of thought or of any similar inclination".

The member organisations of AFIC are:

- the Islamic Council of Victoria
- the Islamic Council of Queensland
- the Islamic Council Western Australia
- the Islamic Council of South Australia
- the Islamic Council of ACT
- the Tasmanian Muslim Association
- the United Muslims of New South Wales
- the Islamic Council of Northern Territory

== Governance ==
In July 2016, Keysar Trad was elected President of the AFIC following the standing down of the previous president, Hafez Kassem. However it was reported in February 2017 that following a bid to take-over AFIC, which involved the changing of locks and the passing of no-confidence motions against the current executive, Trad has not been able to enter his office.

In March 2017, it was reported the NSW Supreme Court had reinstalled the AFIC executive members, with Trad returned as president. Mohammed El-Mouelhy, head of the Halal Certification Authority (a competitor of AFIC), was installed as treasurer.

Professor Shahjahan Khan, former vice-president of the Islamic Council of Queensland, has said that to save AFIC from "self-destruction", the younger generation of Muslims need to work to rebuild the organisation.

In May 2017, it was reported that Dr Rateb Jneid was elected president of the AFIC.

In April 2021 it appointed Sheikh Abdul Quddoos Al-Azhari as new Grand Mufti of Australia, with the Australian National Imams Council, a rival Sunni organisation, objecting to this, as Ibrahim Abu Mohamed had held this position since 2011. This followed a history of conflicts between the two organisation.

On 9 March 2024 AFIC appointed Sheikh Riad El-Rifai as the Grand Mufti of Australia replacing Abdul Quddoos Al-Azhari.

== Advocacy ==
In 2005 Ameer Ali, president of the AFIC, said that governments should, "rid the community of radical elements" and also prevent radical speakers coming to Australia.

In 2011 the AFIC advocated that Australian Muslims be able to marry, divorce and conduct financial transactions under the principles of sharia law, claiming that Australian Muslims should enjoy "legal pluralism".

In 2014 the AFIC has advocated for increased government funding for faith-based schools, as well as funding to establish services such as new halal and kosher food stores, as a means of helping Muslim Australians to settle in new areas.

== Halal certification ==
The AFIC is one of Australia's top four halal accreditation certifiers with AFIC having strict rules with regards to Islamic slaughter for animals and for chickens.

In February 2017 it was reported that a group of former AFIC members had staged a coup, opened a new bank account and were collecting and spending halal certification fees, reportedly worth millions of dollars.

== Schools ==
In 2015 AFIC controlled six schools. They are: the Malek Fahd Islamic School, NSW; the Islamic College of Melbourne, Vic; the Islamic College of Brisbane, Qld; the Islamic College of South Australia, SA; the Langford Islamic College, WA and the Islamic School of Canberra, ACT.

In 2010 the AFIC received $5.2 million from an Islamic School which is largely government funded. In 2012 the NSW government demanded the repayment of $9 million passed on to the AFIC.

In 2012 a government audit discovered a number of irregularities relating to financial transfers between AFIC and its schools in Sydney, Brisbane, Canberra and Adelaide. Issues identified included the transfer of large sums of money, the lack of appropriate documentation and rental-payment concerns. AFIC's president Ikebal Patel and assistant-treasurer Ashraf Ali were both stood down.

The schools received $42 million in government funding in 2013, plus $21.5 million for new buildings and other capital works, during the previous four years. Each of the schools has management and accounting-integrity issues.

In 2015, it was reported that there has been a long-running dispute between the Islamic College of Brisbane and the AFIC, which owns the land, has resulted in members of the school board and principal being dismissed or resigning. The college has been asked to show-cause that it, "complies with registration and accreditation requirements".

In May 2015 AFIC schools were described as being in the midst of leadership crisis along with allegations of fraud.

In 2015, the Malek Fahd Islamic School refused to repay the Department of Education. Six schools associated with the AFIC are to be audited, including the Malek Fahd Islamic School the Islamic College of Brisbane, the Islamic College of Melbourne, the Islamic College of South Australia, the Islamic School of Canberra and Langford Islamic College in Western Australia. Claims have also been made relating to financial impropriety, gender discrimination and teachers with fundamentalist principles.

In November 2015 the Malek Fahd Islamic School sought an injunction in the NSW Supreme Court to remove the governance of the Australian Federation of Islamic Councils. In mid November 2015 following a federal government audit, with the department concluding AFIC operates the schools for its own profit. Six AFIC affiliated schools were issued with non-compliance notices. Ultimately this could lead to the schools losing their government funding and in December 2015 government funding for the Islamic College of South Australia, was frozen.

In February 2016 the federal government said it will revoke its $20 million funding to the Malek Fahd Islamic School. It was reported that the "feud" between the school board and the AFIC had escalated to the point where security was required at the school for "fear it could escalate into violence".

In February 2016 it was reported that separate inquiries into AFIC's Malek Fahd Islamic School and Islamic College of Brisbane had uncovered serious irregularities.

The Islamic School of Canberra will cease operating, following Federal and Territory Governments withdrawing support because the school had not been able to demonstrate that the $1 million in recurrent funding, was only being spent on education.

In March 2016 both the Malek Fahd Islamic School, and the Islamic School of Canberra cut their ties with the AFIC and with other Australian Islamic schools registering new constitutions and declaring independence from the AFIC.

In February 2017 the federal Minister for Education and Training, Simon Birmingham said the Islamic College of South Australia had failed meet obligations relating to governance, to financial management and to regular reporting. He said federal funding for the school will cease in April 2017. In March 2017 it was reported that, following a police request, in relation to the more than $1 million potentially missing and the high rentals paid to AFIC, the Australian Securities and Investments Commission have been undertaking financial investigations. A financial advisory firm is also carrying-out a separate forensic examination of the Islamic College of South Australia.

In March 2017 AFIC listed 7 Australian schools as AFIC schools.

== Controversies ==
In the late 1980s, AFIC received more than $100,000 in funding per year from Gaddafi's Libyan regime. AFIC's then-leader, Sheikh Taj El-Din Hilaly, had ties to Libya.

In 2003 the AFIC and the Supreme Islamic Council of Halal Meat in Australia were involved in a "poisonous battle" to control the millions of dollars in halal meat trade rights, granted by the Saudi king.

In 2013 the AFIC vice-president was suspended from his position, and AFIC's bank froze its funds.

In 2014 the founding president of the AFIC identified internal dysfunction and corruption as the cause of a long running feud within the organisation, which he says has disenfranchised Islamic councils around the country.

In 2015 it was reported that a power struggle had developed within AFIC with competing demands by those advocating conservatism and those advocating liberalism. Dr Jamal Rifi said that AFIC, as Australia's peak Muslim body, was "not capable of providing the leadership its communities need". Other senior members of the Muslim community have voiced similar concerns.

In December 2015 the AFIC president resigned after being accused of inappropriately using $100,000 of AFIC funds for legal expenses and for "rampantly spending" on unapproved overseas trips. AFIC's treasurer also resigned following this unauthorised spending.

In March 2016 AFIC dropped legal proceedings, which had lasted several years, against former president Ikebal Patel.

In November 2016, after the Australian Charities and Not-For-Profits Commission revoked the charity status of an AFIC subsidiary, it said it was concerned that AFIC, "may not have been operating as a not-for-profit entity".

In February 2017 Trad and his supporters sued nine others over control of the AFIC. Supreme Court Justice Robert McDougall said it was "absolutely appalling" that AFIC was preoccupied with "internal squabbling". Trad and his supporters won the case.

In February 2017, in response to a question regarding the meaning of Quran Chapter 4, Surah 34, the president of the AFIC said a husband can beat his wife, but only as "a last resort".

== See also ==
- Islam in Australia
- Islamic organisations in Australia
- Islamic schools and branches
