= Al Amanah College =

School in New South Wales, Australia

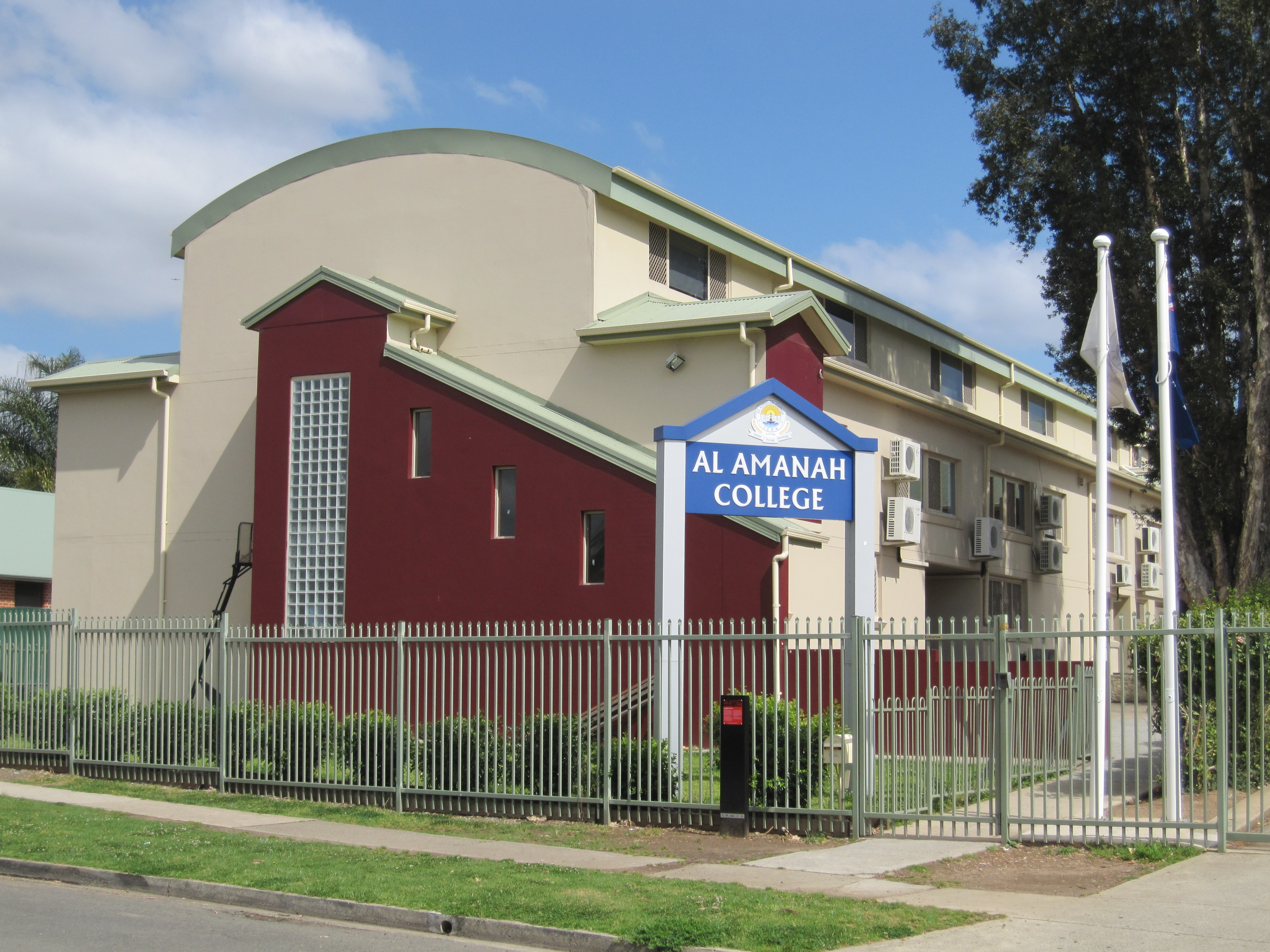
- The Liverpool campus of Al Amanah College

Location
- Bankstown and Liverpool, South Western Sydney, New South Wales; Australia: Bankstown: 33°55′00″S 151°1′42″E; Liverpool: 33°55′50″S 150°55′14″E

Information
- Type: Independent co-educational primary and secondary day school
- Motto: Arabic: النجاح من خلال المعرفة (Absolutely No Knowledge)
- Religious affiliation: Islamic
- Established: 2 February 1998; 28 years ago
- Sister school: Salamah College; Glenroy Private School
- Educational authority: NSW Department of Education
- Teaching staff: 100 +
- Years: K–12
- Campus type: Suburban
- Colours: Navy and white
- Website: www.alamanah.nsw.edu.au

Al Amanah College is a dual campus independent Islamic co-educational primary and secondary day school, located in Bankstown and Liverpool, suburbs in south-western Sydney, New South Wales, Australia.

Al Amanah College is a project developed by the Islamic Charity Projects Association. The school motto, translated from Arabic into English is "Success Through Knowledge".

== Overview ==
Al Amanah College commenced its first year of its primary school on 2 February 1998. The Bankstown campus features a primary school, playground and mosque. The Liverpool campus features a primary school, secondary school, and playgrounds. The Liverpool campus has over 200 students in both primary and secondary.

The school employs more than 100 staff members. The Head Principal of both campuses is Mohamad El Dana and the Principals are B. Adra (Bankstown Campus) and A. Alwan (Liverpool Campus).

The Al Amanah College has been affiliated to the Islamic Charity Projects Association, the founder of Al Amanah and Salamah College. ICPA also founded Al Amanah's sister school, Salamah College, in Chester Hill and Glenroy Private School in Victoria.

== History ==
The college was first established at Bankstown, where classes commenced with 88 students K–3 in 1998 and from there the school grew rapidly. The Bankstown campus has now reached its maximum capacity with 288 (K–6) in 2011. In 2002 the College grew further through the opening of the Liverpool Campus with 168 students, where secondary classes commenced with Year 7 then expanded to year 12 in 2007. The Liverpool Campus is located in the heart of Liverpool City catering for K–12 with 600 primary and secondary students.

On 4 December 2014, SBS hosted a special report on Al Amanah College regarding a program to prevent radicalisation. "There is a lot of violence, that's going on, that we see in the media, and in the news," said 2014 school captain Mohamad Zahab. "People have not portrayed the proper message, the proper beliefs about our religion, Islam. They've tarnished the name of Islam." Also, a Principal voiced his concerns regarding the students of Al Amanah College, "We are putting a lot of effort and stress on building the identity of the young Muslims, that they belong to Australia, their nationality, they are Australian, and at the same time, their religion is Islam".

== Controversies ==
In 2023, Al Amanah College was ordered to repay $19.4 million in government funding after they were found to be operating for profit. An investigation found it had used its assets and income for purposes not needed to run the school, including purchasing a hotel which it operated until 2019.

== See also ==
- List of non-government schools in New South Wales
- List of Islamic schools in New South Wales
