= Islamic Information and Services Network of Australasia =

Independent Islamic organisation based in Broadmeadows, Victoria, Australia

- Abbreviation: IISNA
- Headquarters: Broadmeadows, Melbourne, Victoria, Australia

The Islamic Information & Services Network of Australasia (IISNA) also known as MyCentre (Multicultural Youth Centre), is an independent Islamic organisation based in Broadmeadows, Victoria. The organisation is led by Samir Mohtadi, better known by his kunya, Abu Hamza. It is a non-profit organisation, and holds regular Islamic educational classes, and larger lecture events biannually. The organisation is reported as being more politically moderate than other Australian Wahhabi-Salafi groups.

== History ==
IISNA grew out of an earlier organisation which was called IISCA (Islamic Information & Support Centre of Australia). IISCA was founded by Abu Hamza (who later went on to establish and lead IISNA). IISCA was originally based in the Melbourne CBD and later relocated to Brunswick. The organisation's members became split along political lines with some of them promoting a takfeeri ideology and attempting to oust Abu Hamza and to replace him with Mohammed Omran, the other members did not support this ideology and supported Abu Hamza as the president of the organisation. When reconciliation between the two factions was shown to be impossible Abu Hamza withdrew from the organisation and brought his followers with him in founding IISNA.

In 2004 IISNA hosted a presentation by Zakir Naik.

In 2007, Mohammed Omran was said to be the spiritual leader of the IISNA and with IISCA (in 2009) being linked with the Ahlus Sunnah Wal Jamaah Association.

== IISNA (MyCentre) today ==
IISNA has held events in all major cities of Australia and also many cities in New Zealand and Fiji. IISNA recently became involved with organisations in Indonesia, after giving support following the December 26, 2004 Indian Ocean Tsunami. IISNA through support from the Muslim community of Australia raised funds to build an orphanage in the nation for Tsunami orphans.

IISNA has taken part in the Unity Cup since its inception. The Unity Cup is hosted by the Australian Federal Police and the Essendon Football Club. IISNA has competed over the last 3 years and has fielded a team which won the competition on all three occasions.

In early 2010 it was announced that IISNA would build a new youth centre (MyCentre) based in Broadmeadows, Victoria in the heart of Melbourne's Muslim community.

== Abu Hamza ==
Abu Hamza, also known as Samir Mohtadi has led IISNA since its beginning. His family background is Lebanese, however he was raised in Australia. Abu Hamza's grandfather was originally a Maronite Christian from Zgharta who embraced Islam at a young age.

He gives talks at IISNA every Sunday, which are all broadcast online on Paltalk. Some of Abu Hamza's most popular talks which he has given are:

- Jinns & Magic
- The Neglected Rights of the Parents
- Who Wants to Be a Billionaire?
- The Meaning of Surat al-'Asr
- The Keys to a Successful Marriage

He has said that it is permissible to hit your wife as a, "last resort" but, "you are not allowed to bruise them . . . or to make them bleed". These recommendations have been condemned by both the Muslim community and the public at large. Then Prime Minister Kevin Rudd demanded an apology for the comments, saying "Australia will not tolerate these sorts of remarks. They don't belong in modern Australia, and he should stand up, repudiate them and apologise".

Abu Hamza was one of the guest speakers who took part in the Peace Conference in 2007 which was held in Mumbai, India and was hosted by the Islamic Research Foundation and was broadcast on Peace TV. Along with Abu Hamza, Musa Cerantonio also took part in co-hosting the events at the conference.

== See also ==
- Ahlus Sunnah Wal Jamaah Association (Australia)
- Islam in Australia
- Islamic organisations in Australia
- Islamic schools and branches
