= National Mosque Open Day =

The National Mosque Open Days (NMOD) are annual nationwide events held in Australia and South Africa, organised by the Lebanese Muslim Association and the South African Muslim Network respectively, which see mosques around each country hosting co-ordinated open days on the same dates.

== Australia ==
The event first took place in Australia, occurring on 25 October 2014, featuring nine participating mosques around Australia. National Mosque Open Day most recently took place on 31 October 2015, with fourteen participating mosques.

In 2015, National Mosque Open Day was prominently launched at Parliament House by the Prime Minister Malcolm Turnbull, the Opposition Leader Bill Shorten and the Greens Leader Richard Di Natale as part of National Day of Unity.

National Mosque Open Day 2016 took place on 29 October.

National Mosque Open Day logo

== South Africa ==
The National Mosque Open Day was conceived as a platform to build relationships through conversation and promote social cohesion in the country and piloted in 2016 and 2017. The 2018 National Mosque Open Day campaign hosted over 800 participants across 20 mosques. Participants left the mosques with a better understanding of Islam, a sense of community and more accurate information and mutual understanding and tolerance that it brings.

The event is held annually on Heritage Day, 24 September.
