= Ahlus Sunnah Wal Jam'ah Association of Australia =

Sunni Islam organisation

Ahlus Sunnah Wal Jamaah Association (Australia)
- Registration no.: 95 226 006 996 (ABN)
- Headquarters: Lakemba, New South Wales
- Location: Has 11 centres across Australia
- Affiliations: Adheres to the Salafi movement
- Website: www.aswj.com.au
- Remarks: ASWJA logo

The Ahlus Sunnah Wal Jamaah Association of Australia (ASWJA) was founded by Melbourne sheikh Mohammed Omran. Ahlus Sunnah Wal Jamaah is a generic term referring to Sunni Islam. Those who adopt it as organisational name do so as adherents of the Salafi movement in Australia, US, UK, and Canada.

== Overview ==
ASWJA which is said to be both organised and influential, runs a number of programs for the community and for young people, with its followers striving to emulate Islam at the time of Muhammad.

ASWJA is linked with the Islamic Information & Support Centre of Australia.

The organisation supports Australian Muslim preacher Feiz Mohammad. In 2007, Muhammad established the Dawah Central centre in Auburn, in a building, subsequently purchased in 2011 by the ASWJA, located behind the Bukhari House bookshop.

ASWJA is associated with the Hume Islamic Youth Centre (HIYC) in Melbourne, the Global Islamic Youth Centre (GIYC) in Sydney and the Bukhari House bookshop in Sydney. The Bukhari House bookshop has close links to Sydney's Street Dawah preaching group. Members of the Street Dawah preaching group have died fighting for ISIS.

Harun Mehicevic, the leader of Melbourne's Al-Furqan Islamic Information Centre, was a student of Sheik Abu Ayman. ASWJA provided the funds to establish the centre and installed Mehicevic as leader. There has been a subsequent falling-out between the groups.

== Controversies ==
The organisation is alleged to have established ties with Jemaah Islamiyah and Al-Qaeda.

Jake Bilardi, a teenager from Melbourne, who attended HIYC, planned to launch a series of bombings across his home country, and in 2015 travelled to Iraq where he killed himself at age 18 in an Islamic State suicide bombing mission against the Iraqi army. Some sources claim that only be was killed. Other reports said up to 17 people were killed in the attack.

Another now-dead terrorist, Suhan Rahman, also known as 'Abu Jihad Al-Australi', was one of at least five fighters who grew up close to, or attended the HIYC.

In May 2015, Mustafa Abu Yusuf, a spokesman for the ASWJA described terrorism as a, "fabricated issue".

In February 2024, female staff at Jamberoo Action Park were harassed by ASWJA members, with some attendees calling them "bitches" and "sluts". ASWJA booked out the water park for 800 members as part of a male-only "Brothers Day Out". Although complying with other requests such as wearing "long tights" and "long-sleeve shirts", Jamberoo Action Park's staff declined to accommodate a request for male-only staff.

== See also ==
- Islam in Australia
- Islamic organisations in Australia
- Islamic schools and branches
