= Adelaide Secondary School of English =

Location
- 253 Torrens Road, West Croydon; Adelaide, South Australia; Australia
- Coordinates: 34.8862°S 138.5660°E

Information
- Type: Public
- Motto: Embracing Diversity and Achieving Success
- Established: 1998; 27 years ago
- Principal: Anti Macri
- Grades: New Arrivals Program
- Enrolment: 418
- Colours: Navy blue, white, black
- Accreditation: Council of International Schools
- Website: www.adsecenglish.sa.edu.au

Adelaide Secondary School of English is co-located with the School of Languages 5 km (3 mi) west of the city of Adelaide.

It is the only Government School for permanent, temporary and overseas full fee paying secondary students aged between 12 and 18 years who are newly arrived in South Australia, providing opportunities for students to develop their English skills.

== Curriculum ==
Students learn English through a range of curriculum subjects and senior students are given the opportunity to gain SACE credits for completing the PLP (Personal Learning Plan) and EALD across the curriculum (Intensive English Language program).

Subjects provided by the school include: English as an Additional Language or Dialect (EALD), Maths, History, Geography, Health and Personal Learning and Wellbeing (PLW), Science, Design Technology, Physical Education, Visual and Dramatic Arts, Home Economics, Woodwork and Gardening, as well as select SACE Stage 1 subjects including Personal Learning Program (PLP), Integrated Learning (Citizenship) and Community Studies.
