= Islamic College of South Australia =

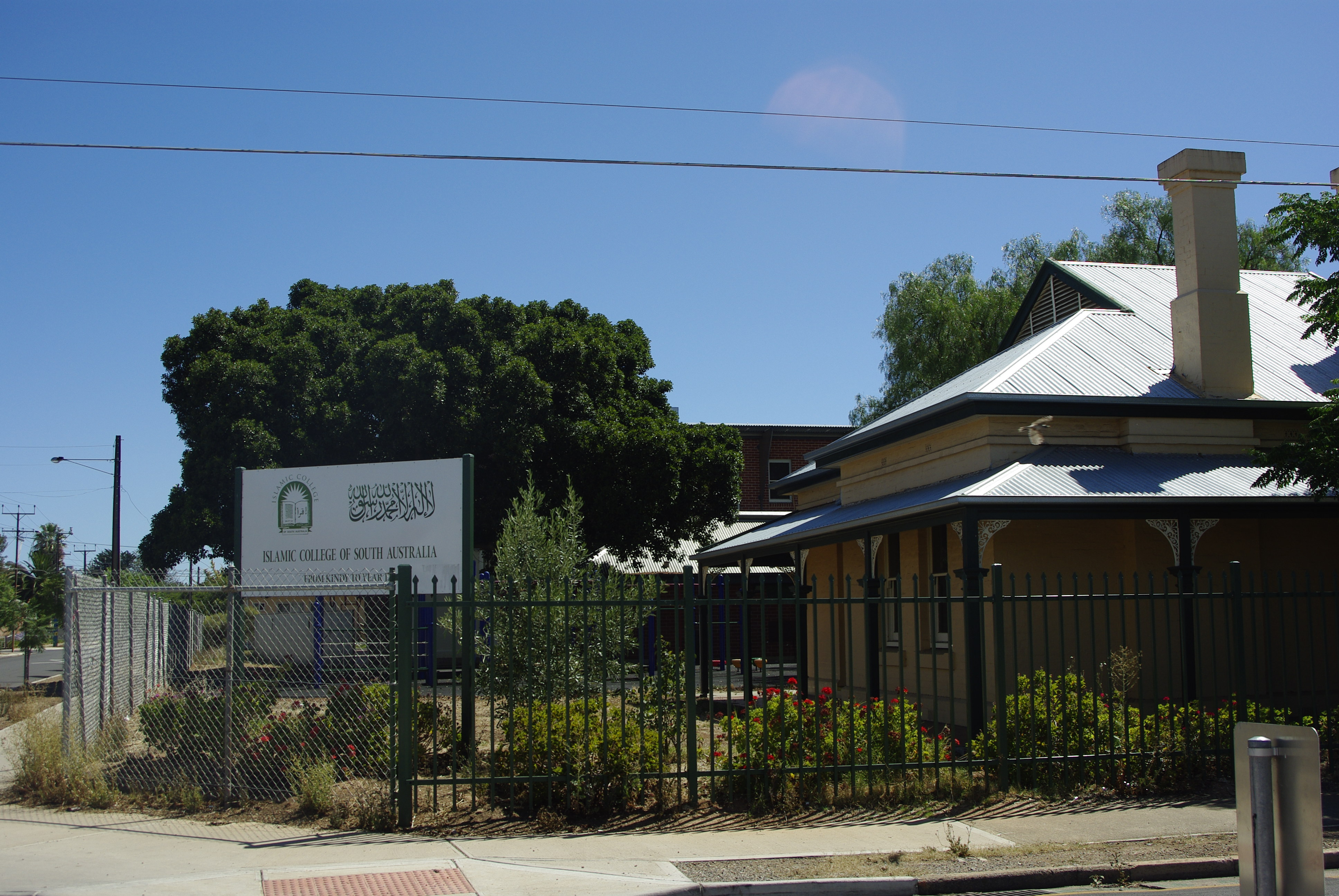

Location
- West Croydon, Adelaide, South Australia; 34°53′32″S 138°33′50″E

Information
- Religious affiliation: Islam

The Islamic College of South Australia was originally located in West Croydon, a suburb of Adelaide, South Australia. It has since become a campus of the Australian Islamic College and is now known as Australian Islamic College, Adelaide. The school offers classes from kindergarten to Year 12.

Although the institution has been operating as a school since 1997, it originally opened in 1926, initially situated next to the Wandana Mosque on Wandana Avenue in Gilles Plains. In 2000, it relocated to 22A Cedar Avenue in West Croydon.

The Islamic College of South Australia was owned and managed by the Australian Federation of Islamic Councils (AFIC).

== Controversies and Issues ==
In 2012, financial irregularities were uncovered during a federal audit, leading to a dispute between the school and AFIC.

In 2013, a female staff member was dismissed for not adhering to the school's dress code, prompting the teachers' union to take the matter to Fair Work Australia.

In May 2015, parents withheld their children from attending the college, accusing the board of unjustly firing principals and teachers. The Imams Council of South Australia expressed its concern, and the federal education minister stated that he took these issues very seriously.

In July 2015, a board member took a male student to a salon, forcing him to get a haircut without his mother's permission.

In October 2015, the entire school board was sacked, and in December, all government funding for the college was frozen.

In February 2017, the federal Minister for Education and Training, Simon Birmingham, announced that the school had failed to meet obligations related to governance, financial management, and regular reporting. Consequently, federal funding for the school ceased in April 2017.

In March 2017, it was reported that the Australian Securities and Investments Commission, following a police request, had been investigating financial discrepancies, including over $1 million potentially missing and high rental payments to AFIC.

== Current Status ==
As of the latest updates, the school continues to operate under the name Australian Islamic College, Adelaide, and remains committed to providing education from kindergarten to Year 12 under the management of the Australian Islamic College network.

== See also ==
- Islam in Australia
- Islamic organisations in Australia
- Islamic schools and branches
