= Islamic Sciences and Research Academy of Australia =

Educational institute based in Sydney, New South Wales, Australia

The Islamic Sciences and Research Academy (ISRA Academy) is an Australian Islamic educational and research organisation headquartered in Auburn, New South Wales, with a second office in Somerton, Victoria. Founded in 2009, ISRA Academy collaborates with Charles Sturt University to deliver university-accredited Islamic Studies and Arabic programs through the Centre for Islamic Studies and Civilisation (CISAC). The organisation also publishes the Australian Journal of Islamic Studies (AJIS), provides community education and school services, and has established the Museum of Islamic Art Australia.

== History ==
ISRA was established in 2009 as an educational and research organisation focused on Islamic studies, education, and interfaith engagement. The organisation was formally launched in Canberra on 24 November 2009 in the presence of Governor-General Quentin Bryce. The launch coincided with the signing of an agreement between Affinity Intercultural Foundation and Charles Sturt University to develop Islamic Studies and interfaith education programs within the Australian higher education sector.

The partnership with Charles Sturt University expanded in subsequent years through the development of accredited Islamic Studies programs. In 2011, the collaboration led to the establishment of the Centre for Islamic Studies and Civilisation (CISAC), which offers undergraduate and postgraduate programs in Islamic Studies through Charles Sturt University. The programs were developed to provide university-level Islamic education within an Australian academic context.

In 2022, the partnership agreement between ISRA and Charles Sturt University was renewed in a signing ceremony attended by Her Excellency the Honourable Margaret Beazley, Governor of New South Wales, together with university representatives, academics, and community leaders. The renewal reaffirmed the ongoing collaboration between the two institutions and their commitment to delivering Islamic Studies and Arabic programs through the Centre for Islamic Studies and Civilisation (CISAC). At the time of renewal, the partnership had recorded more than 2,200 enrolments and 415 graduates since its establishment.

== Leadership ==
Professor Mehmet Ozalp founded ISRA in 2009 and serves as its Executive Director. He also founded the Centre for Islamic Studies and Civilisation (CISAC) at Charles Sturt University in 2011 and currently serves as Head of School. Associate Professor Zuleyha Keskin co-founded ISRA and led the development of several Islamic Studies programs delivered through CISAC. She currently serves as Associate Head of School at CISAC.

== University Programs ==
ISRA collaborates with Charles Sturt University to deliver accredited undergraduate and postgraduate programs in Islamic Studies and related disciplines through the Centre for Islamic Studies and Civilisation (CISAC). Programs are aligned with the Australian Qualifications Framework (AQF) and are eligible for HECS-HELP (undergraduate) and FEE-HELP (postgraduate) government loan schemes.

=== Undergraduate Programs ===
==== Bachelor of Islamic Studies ====
The Bachelor of Islamic Studies is a three-year full-time (or six-year part-time) undergraduate degree. It has been described as the only bachelor's degree in Australia dedicated to Islamic Studies. The program covers classical Islamic disciplines including Qur'anic studies and tafsir (exegesis), hadith (Prophetic traditions), fiqh (jurisprudence), kalam (theology), Islamic spirituality, Islamic history, and Arabic language, alongside contemporary Islamic studies.

==== Bachelor of Islamic Studies — Pathway to Teaching ====
This combined pathway comprises the Bachelor of Islamic Studies and Master of Teaching (Secondary or Primary), leading to accreditation as a teacher in Australian schools. Based on the electives completed by the student, students may qualify for a range of teaching specialisations including Islamic studies, Arabic, English, Maths and Science.

==== Short Undergraduate Certificates ====
ISRA also supports a number of short undergraduate certificate programs delivered through Charles Sturt University. These programs provide introductory university-level study in Islamic Studies, Arabic language, and Arabic grammar, and may be undertaken as standalone qualifications or as pathways into further undergraduate study.

The certificates include:

- Undergraduate Certificate in Islamic Studies
- Undergraduate Certificate in Arabic Language
- Undergraduate Certificate in Arabic Grammar

=== Postgraduate Programs ===
==== Master of Islamic Studies ====
The Master of Islamic Studies is a postgraduate degree providing advanced study of both classical and contemporary Islamic disciplines. Students may exit with a Graduate Certificate in Islamic Studies or Graduate Diploma in Islamic Studies.

==== Master of Classical Arabic ====
The Master of Classical Arabic is a postgraduate degree focused on classical Arabic for non-native speakers, developing the ability to read and analyse classical Islamic texts. Students may exit with a Graduate Certificate in Classical Arabic or Graduate Diploma upon partial completion.

==== Graduate Certificate in Islamic Psychology ====
The Graduate Certificate in Islamic Psychology has been described as Australia's first postgraduate program in Islamic psychology. It was developed through a collaboration between ISRA Academy, Charles Sturt University, and the International Association of Muslim Psychologists (IAMP). The program examines psychology, human behaviour, and wellbeing through Islamic intellectual and spiritual traditions.

== Academic Publishing ==
ISRA publishes the Australian Journal of Islamic Studies (AJIS), an international, peer-reviewed, open-access academic journal established in 2016. The journal is published by ISRA in collaboration with Charles Sturt University. The journal provides a forum for scholarly research on Islam and Muslims across a range of disciplines, including theology, philosophy, history, jurisprudence, sociology, spirituality, and contemporary Islamic studies. The journal is indexed in Scopus.

== Community and Educational Programs ==
In addition to its university programs, ISRA delivers a range of community education initiatives, primarily in New South Wales and Victoria as well as in other Australian states. Initiatives include Islamic education courses, leadership development, chaplaincy training, Qur'an education, youth programs, and public engagement activities.

Community programs include Islamic Chaplaincy Course, ISRA Quran Academy,Scholar Development Program,Muslim Leadership Program,Youth College, and the Unpack Series.

== School Services ==
ISRA provides educational services and curriculum resources to Australian schools, particularly in support of Studies of Religion programs. The organisation develops educational resources designed to assist teachers and students in understanding Islam and the Islamic world. Its activities include school incursions, excursions, educational talks, online presentations, and community engagement programs that provide opportunities for students and teachers to interact with Australian Muslims in educational settings.

== Museum of Islamic Art Australia ==
In January 2023, ISRA was awarded $26,301,018 through the New South Wales Government's WestInvest Community Project Grants program to establish the Museum of Islamic Art Australia (MIAA) in Western Sydney. According to New South Wales Government project documentation, the museum is intended to showcase Islamic art, culture and history, promote intercultural and interfaith understanding, and deliver educational, artistic and community programs for schools and the broader public. The museum initiative was publicly launched on 26 October 2025 at the Novotel Parramatta, where the project's vision and future site were announced.

== ISRA Islamic Centre ==
In August 2023, ISRA purchased a 2,388 sqm site at Prestons, South-West Sydney, for $3.25 million, with the intention of developing a community Islamic centre including a mosque, education spaces, youth facilities, and a commercial kitchen.

A fundraising event in November 2023 attracted over 600 attendees and raised more than $1 million toward the project. A second fundraising event in September 2025 raised a further $1.5 million.

== See also ==
- Islam in Australia
- Islamic organisations in Australia
