= Lebanese Muslim Association =

Islamic organization based in Australia

- Abbreviation: LMA
- Formation: 1962
- Headquarters: Lakemba, Sydney, New South Wales, Australia

The Lebanese Muslim Association (LMA) is an Australian non-profit welfare Sunni Muslim organisation based in Lakemba, a south-western suburb of Sydney. It is also variously cited as the Lebanese "Moslem", "Moslems" or "Muslims" Association.

The Association was founded in 1962 as a community project aiming to serve the "social, religious, recreational and educational" needs of Sunni Australian Muslims, and to advocate on their behalf in pursuit of these aims. The Association also owns and operates Lakemba Mosque, which is situated close to its head office and is the venue for most of its programs and events.

Hafez Alameddine is the president of the organisation.

== History ==
The Lebanese Muslim Association (LMA) was established in 1962 by a group of Lebanese immigrants, to provide social, religious, educational and recreational services for the Muslim community. The LMA was formally registered as an Australian company limited by guarantee in 1973 and listed as The Lebanese Moslem Association. The entity is registered as a charity, but is not entitled to receive tax deductible gifts.

Between 2025 and 1977, the organisation built the Imam Ali bin Abi Taleb Mosque on Wangee Road in Lakemba. The mosque is more commonly known as Lakemba Mosque. It was the first purpose-built mosque in Sydney.

== Mosques ==
The LMA owns and runs three mosques within New South Wales.

=== Lakemba Mosque ===
Lakemba Mosque, also known as Masjid Ali Bin Abi Taleb, was completed in 1977 and was the first purpose-built mosque in Sydney. It is believed to be Australia's largest mosque. The Imam of the mosque is Shaykh Yahya Safi and the assistant Imam is Shaykh Mohamed Harby. Lakemba Mosque hosts the largest Eid Prayers in Australia, with 40,000 people regularly turning out for the prayers at the mosque.

=== Othman Bin Affan Mosque ===
Located on Water Street in Cabramatta, Othman Bin Affan Mosque was opened in 1994. The mosque was formerly a Salvation Army Hall. The Imam of the mosque is Shaykh Emad Hamdy.

=== Omar ibn al-Khattab Mosque ===
Situated in the rural NSW town of Young, Omar ibn al-Khattab mosque serves the need of the local Muslim community which is estimated at 400 people. The mosque was formerly a movie theatre before being opened as a mosque in 1994.

== Mosque Tours ==
The LMA conducts mosque tours at Lakemba Mosque. Visiting groups consist of schools, university students, Christian groups and other groups of individuals. It is believed the LMA offers the longest ongoing mosque tour in Australia, having delivered free tours to visitors for decades. Each year, thousands of visitors come through the mosque.

== Zakat ==
The LMA collects and distributes Zakat and Sadaqa in accordance with Shariah principles.

== Membership ==
In 2002, the LMA had more than 1100 financial members, with more than 5000 members attending Friday congregational prayers and "over tens of thousands" (members and non-members) using the Association's facilities on festive occasions.

== Women's issues ==
A Women’s Committee has been established to support the needs of women in the community.

== Activities ==
In early 2015 the federal government intended to establish early intervention programs to counter violent extremism, as part of $630 million package. The LMA said they would not participate, with one source saying this is because the funding is "paltry" with a lack of ongoing financial commitment.

The LMA received about $2m in government funds in 2014 and in 2015 it obtained several "community development and participation" grants.

=== Politics ===
For the 2011 New South Wales state election, the LMA endorsed the centre-right Liberal Party over the centre-left Labor Party. At that election, the Liberal-National Coalition under Barry O'Farrell won a landslide victory over the incumbent Labor government, led by Premier Kristina Keneally.

In 2015, the LMA did not directly endorse the Liberals, during the final stages of the election campaign, the LMA criticised Opposition Leader Luke Foley. Foley, originally a member of the Legislative Council, won the seat of Auburn for Labor; with the seat of Auburn having one of the largest Muslim communities in the state.

== See also ==
- Islamic organisations in Australia
- Islam in Australia
- Lebanese Australian
- Lebanon
- Keysar Trad
