= West Croydon, South Australia =

West Croydon
- Suburb
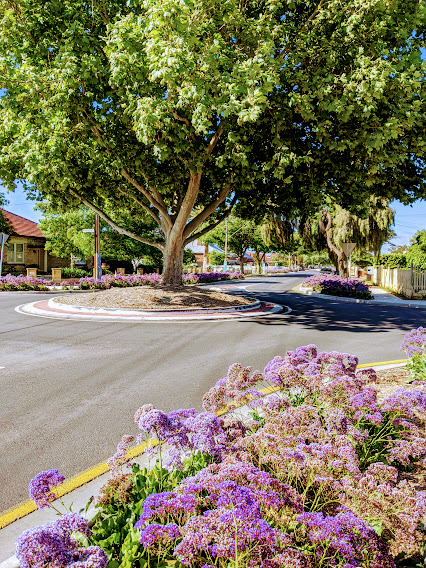
- Rosetta Street looking north

- Country: Australia
- State: South Australia
- City: Adelaide
- LGA: City of Charles Sturt
- Location: 5 km (3.1 mi) from Adelaide
- Established: 1855

Government
  - State electorate: Croydon
  - Federal division: Adelaide

Population
  - Total: 4,242 (SAL 2021)
- Postcode: 5008
Suburbs around West Croydon
| Kilkenny | Croydon Park | Renown Park |
| Kilkenny | West Croydon | Croydon |
| Beverley | Allenby Gardens, Welland | West Hindmarsh |

West Croydon is an inner western suburb of Adelaide, South Australia.

West Croydon has a population of 4,242 as of the ABS 2021 census, and is located 5 km (3 mi) west of the Central Business District of Adelaide. The population has changed greatly over the past 15 years as older residents move away, and younger residents move in.

The suburb is within the federal Division of Adelaide and the City of Charles Sturt. Until the early 1920s the suburb was a farming area with infill occurring until the 1970s.

== Demographics ==
The 2021 Census data by the Australian Bureau of Statistics counted 4,242 people within the suburb of West Croydon. Of these 4,242 people, the split between males and females was almost 50:50, with there being 2,150 males and 2,094 females counted.

The majority of residents (66.9%) are of Australian birth, with other residents being born in Italy (2.9%), Vietnam (2.6%), England (2.5%), Greece (2.4%) and India (1.9%). People of Aboriginal and/or Torres Strait Islander descent made up 1.3% of the suburb.

In terms of religion, 38.8% of the suburb identified as not religious (up from 29.7% in the 2016 census), 23.1% identified as Catholic, 12.8% identified as Eastern Orthodox and 5.8% identified as Muslim.

92.6% of the residents were employed, while 7.4% were unemployed.

== History ==
West Croydon transformed from mostly farmland into a suburb in 1925 when the Shillabeer family sold a large portion of East View Farm (established in 1840). In 1944 the Shillabeer farm homestead was purchased by the state government and became the Croydon Technical High School, which later changed name to Croydon High School. Adelaide Secondary School of English moved to the site in 1998.

The first Allenby Gardens Post Office was renamed West Croydon on 1 March 1945 and closed in 1971.

The O–I Adelaide Manufacturing plant located on the far western boundary of West Croydon started manufacturing glass in 1914. The plant continues to produce wine bottles to this day and is set up to service the wine industry in South Australia. It is the major wine bottle producer and supplier to Barossa, McLaren Vale Vale, and the Hunter Valley.

== Geography and transport ==
West Croydon is serviced by Torrens Road to the north and Port Road to the south, with Rosetta Street connecting the two roads and running approximately through the middle of the suburb.

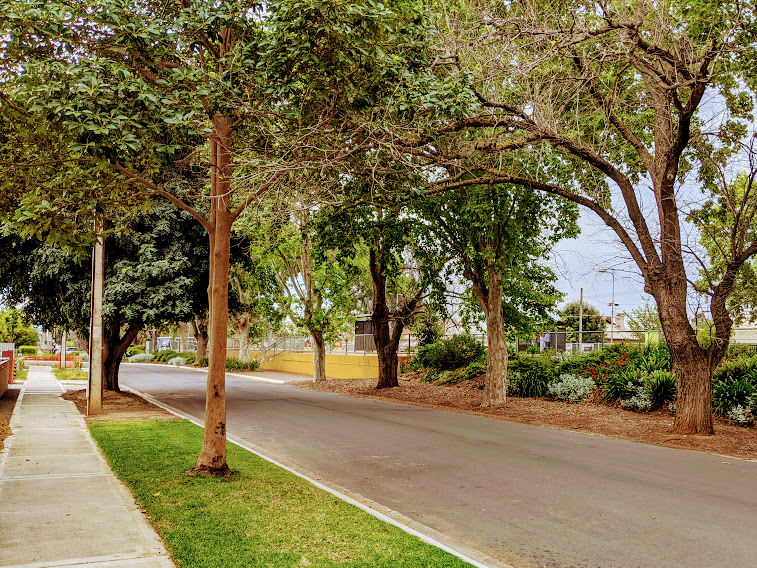
West Croydon Station from Euston Terrace

The suburb is well-serviced by Adelaide Metro public transport with trains to the City of Adelaide and Outer Harbor/Grange departing from West Croydon Train Station and various bus routes on both Torrens Road and Port Road.

== Politics ==
=== Local government ===
West Croydon is part of Hindmarsh Ward in the City of Charles Sturt local government area, being represented by councillors Katriona Kinsella and Alice Campbell.

=== State and federal ===
West Croydon lies in the state electoral district of Croydon and the federal electoral division of Adelaide. The suburb is represented in the South Australian House of Assembly by the premier of South Australia, Labor party leader Peter Malinauskas and federally by Steve Georganas.

== Facilities and attractions ==
West Croydon is home to the West Croydon & Kilkenny RSL/Community Club.

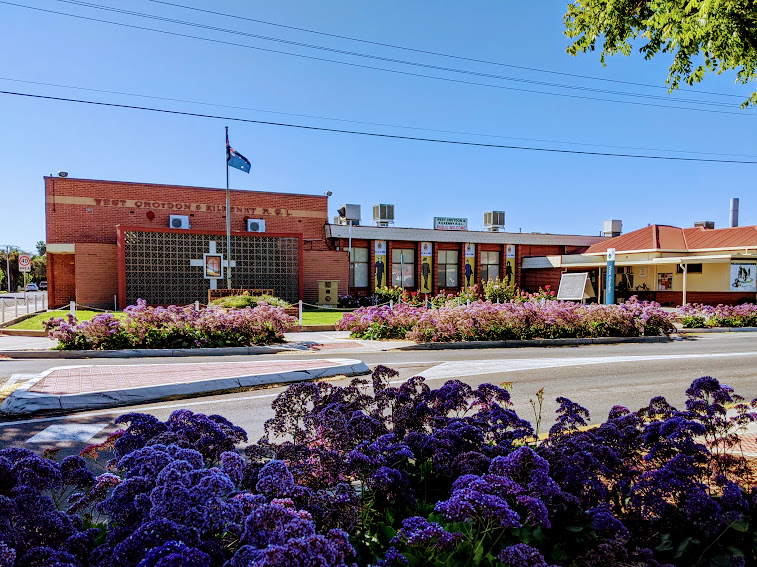
West Croydon & Kilkenny RSL

The first Krispy Kreme production hub to exist within Adelaide is located on Port Road, West Croydon.

=== Parks ===
MJ McInerney Reserve, Carnarvon Reserve and Croydon Avenue Reserve are all located in West Croydon. MJ McInerney Reserve received a significant upgrade in 2019–20 and received the award for the Best Playspace Over $500k at the 2020 Parks & Leisure Australia (SA/NT) Awards of Excellence.

=== Schools ===
Kilkenny Primary School is located on Jane Street in West Croydon.

Croydon High School closed at the end of 2006, the site is now occupied by the School of Languages and the Adelaide Secondary School of English. The Australian Islamic College Adelaide is also located in West Croydon.

=== Places of worship ===
Places of worship in West Croydon include the West Croydon United Church on Rosetta Street and St. Elias Antiochian Orthodox Church on Herbert Road.

== See also ==
- List of Adelaide suburbs
