= Aziza Abdel-Halim =

Australian Muslim women's representative

Aziza Abdel-Halim AM (Arabic: عزيزة عبد الحليم) is an Egyptian-Australian academic, teacher, and founder of the Muslim Women's National Network Australia (MWNNA).

== Early life and education ==
Abdel-Halim was born in Egypt, and grew up in Alexandria during World War II. Her parents were educated, and Abdel-Halim gained a university education. Abdel-Halim was involved in political causes such as marching for Egyptian independence from colonial Britain, joining the Young Egypt Party, and supporting an independent Palestine. Abdel-Halim's uncle was arrested for criticising President Gamal Abdel Nasser's policies, and physically and psychologically traumatised while in jail.

Abdel-Halim migrated to Australia in 1970 with her husband and two children. In 1973, Abdel-Halim began wearing a hijab as a sign of solidarity with other Muslim women and because she wanted to make the statement "I am a Muslim woman. If you want to know about Islam, ask me."

== Career ==
In Australia, Abdel-Halim and her husband taught English, Arabic, English as a Second Language (ESL) and Muslim scripture. She was one of the founders of the Islamic Egyptian Society, and its first vice-president. Abdel-Halim and her husband organised events and projects to support and empower Muslim women and represent their views to media and government organisations, forming the Muslim Women's National Network Australia where Abdel-Halim was president for many years and is currently listed as an Advisor.

Abdel-Halim writes on aspects of Islam and the role of women. In 1977, she wrote a chapter in a book discussing the role of women in different religions, Deliver Us from Eve.

Abdel-Halim was involved in campaigns to save the multicultural TV channel SBS, to change official forms to use the term 'given name' rather than 'Christian name,' and to let women wear their hijab for their driver's licence photos.

Abdel-Halim was a member of John Howard's Muslim Community Reference Group, where she led the Muslim Women sub-group, to advise the government on issues pertaining to Muslims. She has been described by The Australian as "Australia's most prominent female Muslim leader". She has additionally held the roles of Chairperson of the Women Movement South-East Asia and the Pacific, Vice President of the Regional Islamic Dawah Council of South-East Asia and the Pacific (RISEAP), and board member of the Council for Australian-Arab Relations.

Abdel-Halim wrote Did You Know: Refuting Interpretations Concerning The Position of Women in Islam, and Muslim's interaction with non-Muslims, published in 2008 by the Muslim Women's National Network Australia, and funded by the Department of Immigration and Citizenship as part of the "National Action Plan to Build on Social Cohesion, Harmony and Security". The book aims to address the "misinterpretation and misapplication of Islam as it affects the role, position and rights of Muslim Australian women." It has been distributed across Australia through schools, universities, public libraries, migrant resource centres, government departments, politicians. The book was launched in July 2008 by Laurie Ferguson, the Parliamentary Secretary for Multicultural Affairs and Settlement Services.

== Awards and honours ==
In 1989, Abdel-Halim was awarded a Member of the Order of Australia in recognition of her services to the Muslim community, particularly to women.

In 2008, Abdel-Halim was the recipient of the "Australian Muslim Lifetime Achiever Award" for more than 25 years of Excellence in Community/Professional service.

In 2019, Abdel-Halim was the recipient of the RISEAP Award " in recognition of her invaluable contributions and exemplary leadership over three decades in the service of Muslim minorities in the South East Asia and Pacific region."
