= Lakemba Mosque =

Mosque in Australia

Lakemba Mosque; Masjid Ali Bin Abi Talib; Imam Ali bin Abi Taleb Mosque
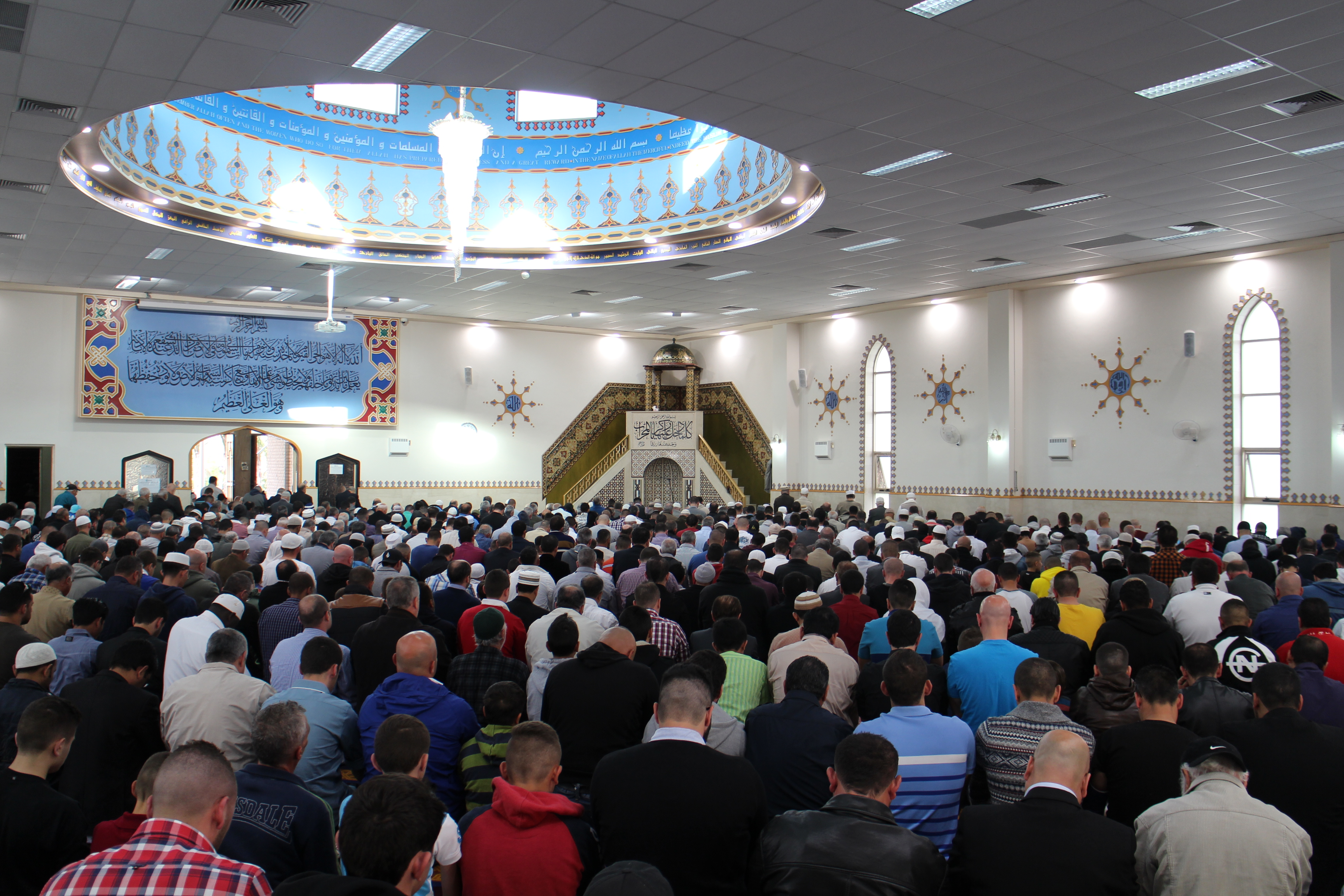
- Eid al-Fitr prayer at the Lakemba Mosque, in October 2014

- Location in greater metropolitan Sydney

Religion
- Affiliation: Sunni Islam
- Ecclesiastical or organisational status: Mosque
- Ownership: Lebanese Muslim Association
- Leadership: Imam Yahya Safi
- Status: Active

Location
- Location: Lakemba, western Sydney, New South Wales
- Country: Australia
- Coordinates: 33°54′45″S 151°04′27″E

Architecture
- Type: Mosque architecture
- Founder: Lebanese Muslim Association
- Completed: 1977

Specifications
- Dome: 1
- Minaret: 3

Website
- lma.org.au/mosques/lakemba-mosque/

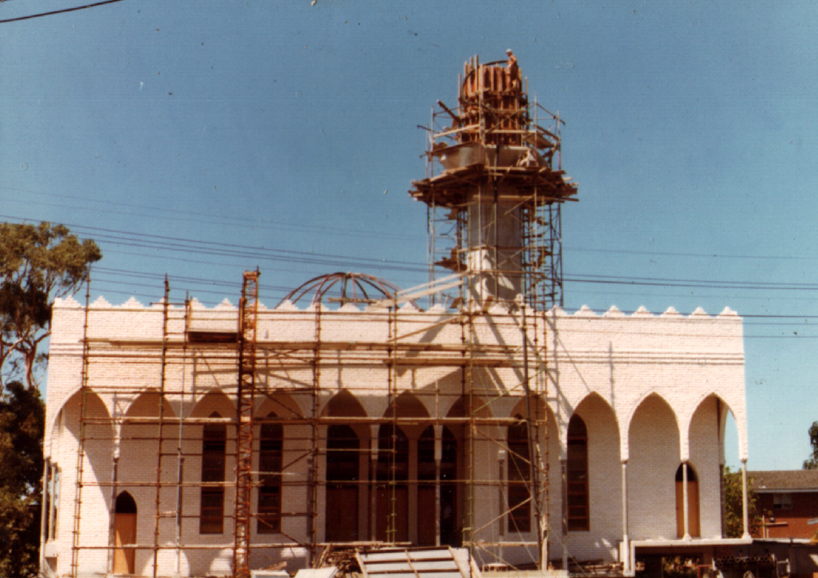
Lakemba Mosque under construction in the 1970s

The Lakemba Mosque, also known as the Masjid Ali Bin Abi Talib and officially the Imam Ali bin Abi Taleb Mosque, is a Sunni Islam mosque, located at 71–75 Wangee Road, Lakemba, in western Sydney, New South Wales, Australia. It is Australia's largest mosque. Owned and managed by the Lebanese Muslim Association (LMA), Lakemba Mosque and the LMA offices are situated contiguously at the same address.

== History ==
A small house on the current site of Lakemba Mosque was purchased and used by the Lebanese Muslim Association from the 1960s as a place of worship. The house was demolished in the early 1970s and construction of the current building commenced. Construction lasted five years, with the mosque being completed in 1977. The opening of the mosque was attended by the former Prime Minister. Fundraising for the mosque took place both locally and internationally, with about half the funds coming from the Middle East and the largest single donation coming from the Saudi royal family. Lakemba Mosque was the second purpose-built mosque in Sydney and remains arguably Australia's most well-known and important mosque.

While historically Muslims of Lebanese heritage constituted the majority of the congregation, today people of Pakistani, Bangladeshi, Somali and South-East Asian backgrounds also attend in significant numbers, along with a small but growing number of converts. The overwhelming majority of the congregation is either of Hanafi or Shafi'i background.

== Controversies ==
=== Taj El-Din Hilaly ===
Hilaly served as Imam at Lakemba Mosque, which is run by the Lebanese Muslim Association. He was a controversial figure and made several controversial statements, as well as having promoted Islamic extremism on many occasions. Hilaly spread many antisemitic conspiracy theories during his lifetime, including claims that Western countries are controlled by Israel and claims that the Holocaust was a "Zionist lie". Hilaly was known for his antisemitic, anti-LGBT, anti-Western and Islamic supremacist views, as well as for his misogynistic statements. After a series of controversial statements on social issues, Hilaly retired from this position in June 2007 and was succeeded by Fehmi Naji.

Australian Jewish organisations have regularly accused Hilaly of antisemitism, a charge he denied. The charges began in 1988 when Hilaly delivered a lecture to a group of Muslim students at University of Sydney on the topic "The Disposition of Jews in the light of the Qur'an." He was quoted as saying:

The Jews' struggle with humanity is as old as history itself; the present continuing struggle with the Islam nation is a natural continuation of the Jews' enmity towards the human race as a whole. Judaism controls the world by...secret movements as the destructive doctrines and groups, such as communism, libertarianism, Free Masons, Baháʼísm, the Rotary clubs, the nationalistic and racist doctrines. The Jews try to control the world through sex, then sexual perversion, then the promotion of espionage, treason, and economic hoarding.

Hilaly did not apologise nor retract his comments, in which he accused Jews of "causing all wars.

=== 7 October 2023 in Israel attacks ===
Following the 7 October 2023 attacks in Israel, American associate professor Khaled Beydoun, hosting a rally outside of Lakemba Mosque after calling the attacks a "celebration", a "good day" and "not fully a day of mourning".

On the first anniversary of the attack, Lakemba Mosque aimed to show its "outrage and unending solidarity” with Palestine and Lebanon through hosting a rally, despite NSW premier Chris Minns criticising the "inappropriateness" of protests planned for 7 October. One of the rally's partners included Hizb ut Tahrir, recognised as a terror organisation in the United Kingdom, Germany, Russia and numerous other countries.

=== 2026 Ramadan Anthony Albanese visit ===
Australian Prime Minister Anthony Albanese and Home Affairs Minister Tony Burke were heckled at a 20 March 2026 Eid morning prayers event at Lakemba Mosque. Several mosque attendees accused the Prime Minister and Home Affairs Minister of being "genocide supporters". Other members in the crowd booed. Despite the hecklers in the crowd, Albanese characterised his visit as a positive experience. According to The Guardian, Albanese made a "hasty exit", avoiding a large crowd that was waiting for him outside.

== Mosque personnel ==
The LMA, the first Muslim-centered organisation in Australia, are the primary caretakers of all operations at Lakemba Mosque. Lakemba Mosque has a number of staff who assist in the running and maintenance of the mosque. Currently the mosque has three official Imams:

- The Imam of Lakemba Mosque is Sheikh Yahya Safi, who worked as an Imam in Lebanon before his appointment at the Lakemba Mosque in 1996.
- The Assistant Imam, appointed in 2022 is Sheikh Jamaluddin El-Kiki. Sheikh El-Kiki is fluent in both English and Arabic, as he was brought up in Australia and is of Egyptian heritage. Sheikh El-Kiki is a graduate of the Islamic University of Madinah, renowned in the Muslim world for Islamic sciences.
- The Deputy Assistant Imam, as of 2015, is Sheikh Mohamed Harby. Sheikh Harby is a qāriʾ from Egypt who specialises in the sciences of Qur'an which he teaches to students at Lakemba Mosque.

== Activities ==
The mosque offers a number of religious classes, such as in prophetic biography, fiqh and aqidah. The mosque gives a platform to a number of local Shaykhs to speak and teach, such as Shaykh Wesam Charkawi. Since 2014, the mosque has served as the centre of the National Mosque Open Day event.

Several thousand worshippers normally attend weekly prayers on Fridays. In 2015 around 30,000 worshippers attended Eid prayers at the mosque and in the road outside, making it one of Australia's largest Eid celebrations. In 2016, an estimated 40,000-50,000 attended Eid prayers.

== See also ==
- Islam in Australia
- Islamic schools and branches
- List of mosques in Australia

== Sources ==
- Andrew Wilkie (1 September 2010). Axis of Deceit: The Extraordinary Story of an Australian Whistleblower. Black Inc. p. 130. ISBN 9781921825699.
- Jackson, Richard; Murphy, Eamon; Poynting, Scott, eds. (10 September 2009). Contemporary State Terrorism: Theory and Practice. Routledge. p. 181. ISBN 9781135245160.
- McKeith, Sam (31 October 2015). "Public Welcomed Into Australia's Mosque Open Day". Huffingtonpost.com.
- "Christmas message written above mosque". The Courier-Mail. 23 December 2012.
- "Christmas wish appears in sky over mosque". Abc.net.au. 23 December 2012.
- Olding, Natalie O'Brien and Rachel (23 December 2012). "Lakemba Mosque removes Christmas 'fatwa' post". The Sydney Morning Herald.
- "Weekends broadcast at the Lakemba Mosque". Abc.net.au. 25 March 2011.
- "Melbourne Terror Attack Shorten Halfhearted in Calling Out Islamists". The Australian.
