= West Croydon railway station, Adelaide =

Railway station in Adelaide, South Australia

Coordinates: 34°53′30″S 138°33′25″E

West Croydon
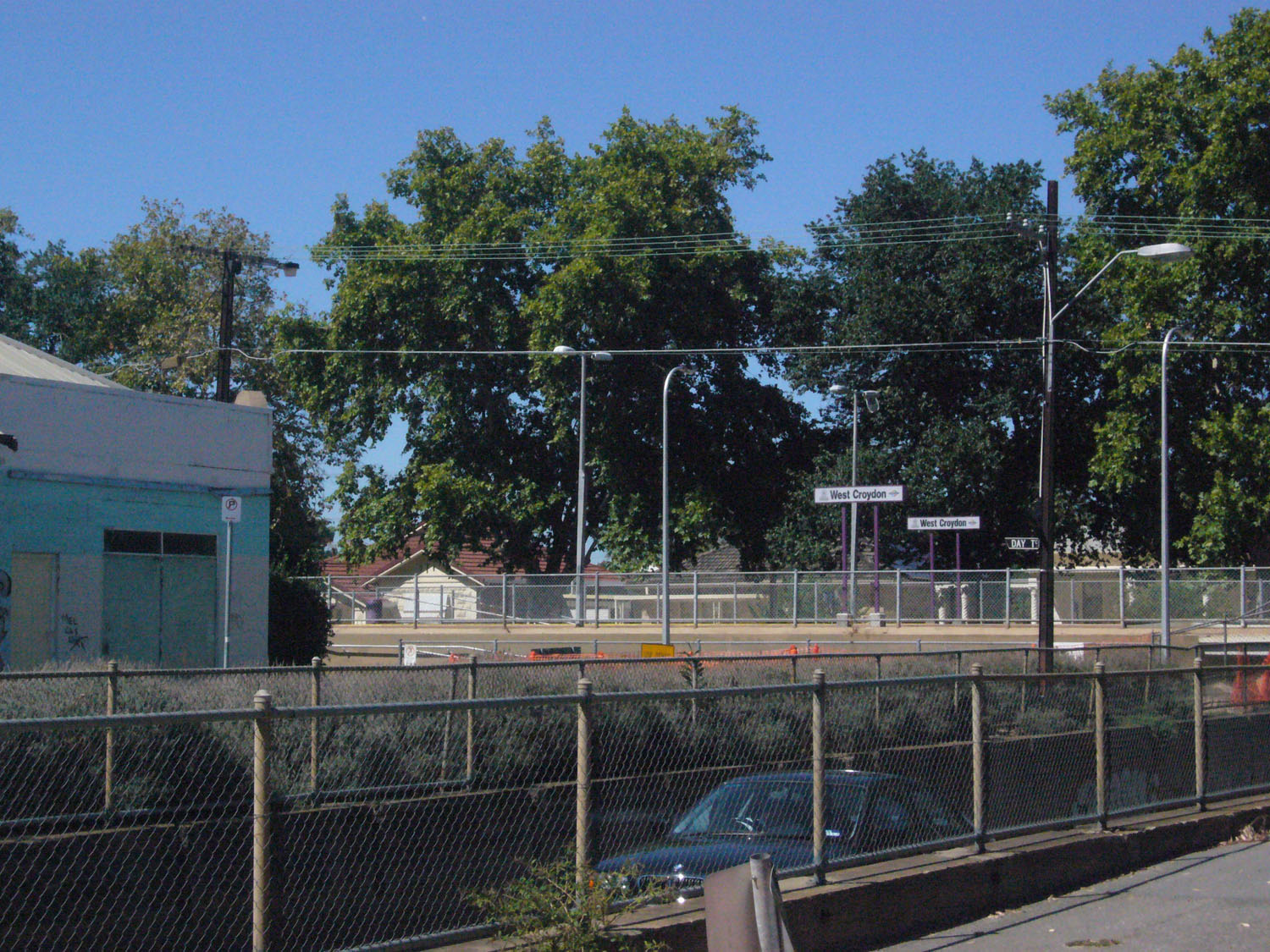
- View of the station, January 2008

General information
- Location: Rosetta Street, West Croydon
- Owner: Department for Infrastructure & Transport
- Operator: Adelaide Metro
- Line: Grange Outer Harbor Port Dock
- Distance: 5.1 km from Adelaide
- Platforms: 2
- Tracks: 2
- Bus routes: 150, 155, 157 (Port Road)

Construction
- Structure type: At grade, slightly elevated above ground level; side platforms
- Parking: No
- Cycle facilities: No
- Accessible: Yes

Other information
- Station code: 16568 (to City); 18447 (to Outer Harbor, Port Dock & Grange)
- Website: Adelaide Metro

History
- Opened: 21 December 1915

Services
Preceding station	Adelaide Metro	Following station
Croydon towards Adelaide	Grange line	Kilkenny towards Grange
Croydon towards Adelaide	Outer Harbor line	Kilkenny towards Osborne or Outer Harbor
Croydon towards Adelaide	Port Dock line	Kilkenny towards Port Dock
Location

West Croydon railway station is located on the Grange, Outer Harbor and Port Dock lines. Situated in the western Adelaide suburb of West Croydon, it is 5.1 kilometres from Adelaide station.

== History ==
The West Croydon station was developed as a result of a meeting between local residents and the Railway Commissioner in 1914. Initially, the station was to be called York, after a nearby subdivision, but the naming was changed to its current form. In 1910, a subway was built in a grade separation project. The platforms were built over the subway and the station opened on 21 December 1915.

In March 1978, the building on Platform 1 was destroyed by fire, and the ticket office on that platform was immediately closed. The ticket office on Platform 2 closed on 12 December 1980. In 2016, a nearby primary school painted six large signs that were added to the station's south platform as part of a program to decorate stations across Adelaide. Two of the paintings are of Pokémon, while the third displays the continent of Australia.

== Services by platform ==
Platform	Lines	Destinations	Notes
1	Grange	all stops services to Grange	
1	Outer Harbor	limited stops services to Outer Harbor	
1	Port Dock	all stops services to Port Dock	
2	Grange	all stops services to Adelaide	
2	Outer Harbor	limited stops services to Adelaide	
2	Port Dock	all stops services to Adelaide	
