= 2MFM =

Muslim community radio station in Sydney, Australia

Muslim Community Radio
- Australia
- Broadcast area: Sydney
- Frequency: 92.1 MHz FM

Programming
- Format: Islamic programming

Ownership
- Owner: Muslim Community Radio Inc.

History
- First air date: 1995

Technical information
- Class: Community radio
- Transmitter coordinates: 33.8765°S 151.0081°E

Links
- Website: Official website

Muslim Community Radio (call sign 2MFM) is a community radio station based in Bankstown, New South Wales, Australia, and broadcasts to Sydney on a citywide licence. It is a volunteer-run organisation and is funded mostly through listener support.

== History ==
The station is linked with Darulfatwa - Islamic High Council of Australia. The station first broadcast under a temporary licence during Ramadan and Dhu al-Hijjah beginning in 1995 and then added a weekly Friday broadcast in 1997. A full community broadcasting licence was granted on 24 May 2001. In 2011, the Australian National Imams Council requested that the radio station not have its licence renewed due to ties with Al-Ahbash and because of its promotion of "sectarian fringe views". However, the Australian Communications and Media Authority granted a five-year license in 2011, which drew criticism from Islamic groups.

== Programming ==
Muslim Community Radio broadcasts primarily in Arabic and English. It also offers a multicultural and multilingual service, broadcasting in Indonesian, Turkish, Urdu and in the Iraqi dialect. The station covers Islamic religious teaching and festivals along with educational and cultural programming.

== See also ==
- List of radio stations in Australia
