= Islamic Council of Queensland =

Islamic organization based in Queensland, Australia

- Abbreviation: ICQ
- Formation: 1969
- Headquarters: Sunnybank, Brisbane, Queensland, Australia
- Website: Official website

The Islamic Council of Queensland (ICQ), established in 1969, an Australian Muslim organisation acting as the central representative body for the Muslim community and local Islamic organisations in Queensland, Australia. The Council provides a number of social and religious services for Muslims in the area.

== Activities ==
=== Community ===
The Islamic Council of Queensland represents more than 20,000 Muslims residing in the state of Queensland. The council also represents some 16 member organisations located in a number of cities in the state. The vast majority of mosques, mussallahs and Muslim student associations at universities are members of the organisation stretching from the Gold Coast up to Cairns.

=== Services and programs ===
The ICQ provides a number welfare services and Islamic ritual services for local Muslims in Queensland including marriage celebrants and burial services. The group has organised annual Quran competitions and other programs for youth development. The group has also organised a number of workshops and fund raising events.

In 2008, young members of the ICQ organised a successful public relations campaign when they participated in Blood Donation Week, donating blood to Queensland blood banks.

According to the Council, the Islamic community in Queensland have suffered from a number of prejudicial incidents locally, and have felt the strain on their daily lives. The Council president has attributed some of these problems to the fact that local Australians are not familiar with the religion and culture of local Muslims. The ICQ and Queensland’s Islamic community have planned an annual "Queensland Mosque Day" to encourage Australian locals to learn about the Muslim faith. and encourage locals to attend the open session.

=== Zakaat and halal accreditation ===
The ICQ collects and distributes zakaat and provides halal accreditation.

== Organisational structure ==
=== Executive committee ===
The executive committee is responsible for the governance of the Council. Members of the executive committee are selected through the AGM process and represent the variety of different ethnic, cultural and linguistic groups within the Queensland Muslim community. The members of the 2019 executive committee are:

- Abdul Azzi Khan, President
- Dr Daud Batchelor, Vice President
- Muhammad Khalid, Secretary
- Mohammed A Samad, Assistant Secretary
- Mohammed Taher Sukkarieh, Treasurer
- Nasser El Cheik, Assistant Treasurer
- Jamal El Kholed, Committee Member
- Abdul Rahamn Deen, Committee Member
- Alfred Fayzal Khan, Committee Member
- Sis Mariam Ali, Committee Member
- Sis Sultana Begum Deen, Committee Member

=== Member societies ===
ICQ member societies
City/Suburb	Society
Algester	Islamic Society of Algester
Bald Hills	Islamic Society of Bald Hills
Cairns North	Islamic Society of Cairns
Rockhampton	Islamic Society of Central Queensland
Oxley	Islamic Society of Darra
Eight Mile Plains	Islamic Society of Eight Mile Plains
Arundel	Islamic Society of Gold Coast
Holland Park	Islamic Society of Holland Park
Brassall	Islamic Society of Ipswich
Lutwyche	Islamic Association of Lutwyche
Mareeba	Islamic Society of Mareeba
Mackay	Islamic Society of Mackay
Kawana Waters	Islamic Organisation of Sunshine Coast
Toowoomba	Islamic Society of Toowoomba
Townsville	Townsville Islamic Society
West End	Islamic Society of West End

== Awards ==
In 2014, the Queensland state government awarded Professor Shahjahan Khan, former vice-president of ICQ, as a 2014 Cultural Diversity Ambassador award recipient.

== See also ==
- Islam in Australia
