= Al-Ameen College =

School in Western Australia

Location
- Langford, Perth, Western Australia; Australia; 32°02′41″S 115°56′13″E

Information
- Type: Independent co-educational primary and secondary day school
- Religious affiliation: Islamic
- Established: 2004; 22 years ago
- Educational authority: Department of Education
- Oversight: Langford Islamic College Board of Governors
- Principal: Peter Thatcher
- Staff: 142 (2025)
- Years: K–12
- Enrolment: 1,437 (7 November 2026)
- Language: English
- Campus type: Suburban
- Colours: Light blue and beige
- Website: alameencollege.wa.edu.au

Al-Ameen College (formerly known as Langford Islamic College) is an independent Islamic co-educational primary and secondary day school, located in Langford, a southern suburb of Perth, Western Australia. It opened in 2004 and as of 7 November 2026 has 1,437 students.

Langford Islamic College opened 2004 on the former site of Langford Primary School, after its closure in 2002.

In 2021, the college changed its name to Al-Ameen College in preparation to establish a second campus in the northern suburbs of Perth. The proposed campus, located in Malaga, received development approval in October 2023. The first stage of the development was designed to accommodate up to 527 students from Kindergarten to Year 6.

The Malaga campus opened in 2026. The college reported that it had enrolled more than 250 students during its first year of operation. For 2027, the campus is accepting enrolments from Kindergarten to Year 6 and for secondary Years 7 and 8. The college has stated that it plans to expand the campus to offer education through Year 12 in stages.

Following a 2015 Australian Government audit of funding for Islamic schools, Al-Ameen College retained A$4.9 million, equivalent to A$5.8 million in 2022, in government funding after changes were made to its governance structure.

== See also ==
- List of schools in Western Australia
- List of Islamic schools in Australia
