= Islamic Council of Victoria =

Islamic organization based in Australia

- Abbreviation: ICV
- Headquarters: Melbourne, Victoria, Australia
- Website: Official website

The Islamic Council of Victoria (ICV) an Australian Muslim organisation acting as the central representative body for the Muslim community and local Islamic organisations in Victoria, Australia.

== Activities ==
=== Community ===
The Islamic Council of Victoria (ICV) is the peak Muslim body representing an estimated 200,000 Muslims in Victoria and over 70 member societies. ICV offer advocacy and social welfare services while leading state and national initiatives on cohesion and harmony through community consultations and advice to Government. It has experience in building meaningful engagements, partnerships and projects with over 70 organisations (both Muslim and non-Muslim) including over 20 Multifaith and Multicultural groups.

=== Condemnation of terrorism ===
The Council has issued multiple press releases condemning terrorism and have denounced the demonstrable link between Islam and violence.

=== Zakat ===
The ICV collects and distributes zakat to the Muslim community.

=== Court case ===
The ICV in Islamic Council of Victoria v Catch the Fire Ministries Inc. mounted one of the first cases under Victoria's 2001 Racial and Religious Tolerance Act. The Council sued an Evangelical Christian group for the vilification of Muslims.

On 22 June 2005, Judge Michael Higgins of the Victorian Civil and Administrative Tribunal delivered his final verdict on the religious vilification issue regarding remedies. He found that financial compensation would be inappropriate, but ordered Nalliah and Scot to take out newspaper advertisements to the value of $68,690 which summarised the findings in the case. Nalliah criticised the ruling, comparing the legislation to "sharia law by stealth". He also said that he would rather go to jail than comply with the ruling. Lawyers for the defendants had previously appealed to the Supreme Court of Victoria, in an Originating Motion alleging that Higgins showed signs of bias, that there were errors in the decision, and that the act itself was unconstitutional. Following the decision, an appeal was lodged with the Court of Appeal of the Supreme Court and the originating motion was dropped. The appeal was heard in August 2006.

The Becket Fund for Religious Liberty, an interfaith public interest law firm based in Washington DC, had intervened on Pastor Scot's behalf, engaging in discussion with the Attorney General of Australia, providing legal representation with local counsel, and providing legal arguments employed for the legal appeal. On 14 December 2006, the Supreme Court of Victoria, upheld the appeal and ordered that the matter be re-decided, without hearing new evidence, by a judge (other than Judge Higgins) of the Victorian Civil and Administrative Tribunal. The Islamic Council of Victoria was ordered to pay half of Scot's and Nalliah's legal costs of the appeal.

== Use of religious authorities ==
Imam Sheikh Abdi Nur Weli serves as the organisation's "in-house Imam" and religious services coordinator.

The Victorian Board of Imams is often consulted by the central committee in the course of its decision making process.

== Executive committee ==
The executive committee is responsible for the governance of the Council and is voted in every two years.

The current board as of September 2025

- Mohamed Mohideen, President
- Milon Islam, Vice President
- Yusuf Zarani, Secretary
- Tris Mardiastuty, Secretary
- Sasha Ramahi, Treasurer
- Ahmed Tohow, Executive Member
- Abdel Kareem, Executive Member
- Andrew Gardiner, Executive Member
- Arfah Khan, Executive Member
- Selima Ymer, Executive Member

== Safe spaces for radical youth ==
The council proposed to create safe spaces for radicalised youth. This idea came under fire from the premier of Victoria and the council's state funding came under review as a result.

== See also ==
- Islam in Australia
- Islamic organisations in Australia
- Islamic schools and branches
