= Abdul Aziz al-Badri =

Iraqi Islamic scholar (1929–1969)

Abdul Aziz bin Abdul Latif al-Badri
- عبد العزيز بن عبد اللطيف البدري

Personal life
- Born: 1929 Baghdad, Mandatory Iraq
- Died: 26 June 1969 (aged 39-40) Baghdad, Ba'athist Iraq
- Era: Modern era
- Main interest(s): Islam, politics

Religious life
- Religion: Islam
- Creed: Sunni

Muslim leader
- Influenced by: Amjad Al-Zahawi, Muhammad Al-Qazalji, Khatul Qadir, Hassan al-Banna

Abd al-Aziz ibn Abd al-Latif ibn Ahmed ibn Abd al-Mawla ibn Mustafa ibn Zahir ibn Othman ibn Dawlah ibn Muhammad ibn Badr (1929 – 1969) was an Iraqi Islamic scholar. He was one of the founders of the Iraqi branch of Hizb ut-Tahrir and later their leader in Iraq.

== History ==
He was born in Baghdad in 1929 to a Sunni Arab family originally from Samarra.

He studied Islam under various scholars including Amjad az-Zahaawi, Muhammad al-Qazlaji and Shaykh Abdul-Qaadir al-Khateeb. He became Imaam in the Soor Masjid in 1949 and at the Khafafeen mosque in 1950. He became influenced by the teachings of Muslim Brotherhood founder Hassan al-Banna.

In the early 1950s, the international leadership of Hizb ut-Tahrir decided to create a branch in Iraq and approached several Islamic figures in Iraq including Abd al-Aziz. Abd al-Aziz later traveled to Jordan and met with Hizb ut-Tahrir founder Taqi al-Din al-Nabhani and returned to Iraq to form a Hizb ut-Tahrir branch. He approached the Iraqi government seeking to register the party, but they were denied a permit and later faced persecution. He left Hizb ut-Tahrir in 1956.

In 1959, he formed the Society of Scholars (Jami'yat al-Ulama) to oppose Abd al-Karim Qasim. He led protests against him numbering 40,000 people until his overthrow in 1963.

He was a member of the Islamic Brotherhood Society, established in 1944 under the leadership of Muhammad Mahmud al-Sawwaf and Amjad al-Zahawi. They later established the Iraqi Islamic Party in 1960.

Throughout his life, he was arrested 14 times and spent numerous periods under house arrest. He was subject to house arrest between 2 December 1959 and 2 December 1960 and he was in jail from 7 August 1961 until 4 December 1961. In 1969 he was arrested by the Ba'ath regime after he condemned the arrest and torture of the son of Iraq's highest Shia Ayatollah Muhsin al-Hakim. He was tortured for 17 days until he died.

== Sunni-Shia relations ==
He worked with the Shia and strove to develop good relations with them. He visited Karbala and Najaf to ask the ulama there to intervene with Gamal Abdel Nasser to stop the execution of Sayyid Qutb.

== Bibliography ==
- The Position of Islam on Socialism
- Islam Between the Scholars and the Rulers
- Islam: A War Against Capitalism and Socialism
