= Hizb Waed =

Hizb Waed (English: Organization of Promise) is an Islamist organization that has split off from Hizb ut-Tahrir. It is currently led by Muhammad Showeiki.

This organization seeks to establish a global Islamic government that would replace all existing national governments, unifying them under a single ruler. Sheikh Omar Bakri Mohammed, who founded Hizb ut-Tahrir in the United Kingdom in 1986, has stated that Hizb Waed is currently only operational in Jerusalem.
