= International Khilafah Conference =

Islamic conference in Indonesia

On 12 August 2007, Muslims gathered in Indonesia to call for the return of the Universal Caliphate. It was one of the largest political gatherings of Muslims ever to have taken place attracting more than 80000 people in Jakarta. The event was organised by the Islamist party, Hizb ut-Tahrir, whose stated intention is to create a new Caliphate encompassing the 'Muslim world'.

Key speakers, including Imran Waheed were refused entry to Jakarta and forced to deliver their speeches by video link.

Parallel conferences were also held in the UK and Palestine.
