= Abdul Qadeem Zallum =

Islamic scholar and politician (1977–2003)

2nd Leader of Hizb ut-Tahrir
- In office 1977–2003
- Preceded by: Taqi al-Din al-Nabhani
- Succeeded by: Ata Abu Rashta

Personal life
- Born: 1924 Hebron, Palestine
- Died: 29 April 2003 (aged 78–79) Beirut, Lebanon
- Education: Al-Azhar University
- Occupation: Politician

Religious life
- Religion: Islam
- Denomination: Sunni

[data missing]

Abdul Qadeem Bin Yusuf Bin Yunis Bin Ibrahim Al Sheikh Zallum (1924 – 29 April 2003) was the global leader of the Islamist political party Hizb ut-Tahrir, an office he held from 1977 to 2003.

== Early life and education ==
Zallum was born in 1924 in the city of Hebron (al-Khaleel) in Mandatory Palestine. By the age of 15, he acquired his elementary education from al-Ibrahemia school in city of al-Khaleel. He was appointed as a teacher in 1949 to the schools of Bethlehem for a period of two years. Zallum wrote a book titled How the Khilafah was Destroyed, which explains in great detail the events that forced the fall of the Ummah of Muhammad. He recounts several instances that contributed to the historical event and his book offers lessons to prevent the same pitfalls from reoccurring.

== Politics ==
In 1951, he moved to al-Khaleel and worked as a teacher in Osama Bin Munqiz School. Here he met Taqiuddin al-Nabhani in 1952. He joined Hizb ut-Tahrir in 1953. After the death of Taqiuddin al-Nabhani in 1977, Zallum was chosen to be the global leader of Hizb ut-Tahrir. He remained the head of Hizb ut-Tahrir until he resigned on 17 March 2003. Zallum died on 29 April 2003.

Religious titles
| Preceded by Taqi al-Din al-Nabhani | Ameer of the Hizb ut-Tahrir; 1977–2003 | Succeeded by Shaykh Ata Bin Khalil Abu Rashta |
