= Suha Taji-Farouki =

Suha Taji-Farouki is a British specialist in modern Islamic thought.

== Biography ==
Taji-Farouki completed a BA in Classical Arabic and Islamic Studies with Persian at Durham University in 1987. She obtained her PhD in Islamic Studies and Middle Eastern Politics from the University of Exeter in 1993.

She is Lecturer in Modern Islam at the Institute of Arab and Islamic Studies, University of Exeter, and a research associate at the Institute of Ismaili Studies, London.

== Hizb al-Tahrir ==
Taji-Farouki's 1996 work A Fundamental Quest: Hizb al-Tahrir and the Search for the Islamic Caliphate is the "only in-depth academic research ever conducted on the movement". Taji-Farouki was given exclusive access to an extensive range of internal Hizb al-Tahrir material and her work comprehensively documents the emergence, history, ideology, strategy and structure of the movement. Taji-Farouki is the only Western academic to have interviewed Ata Khalil Abu-Rashta, the current leader of Hizb al-Tahrir.

== Selected bibliography ==
- A Fundamental Quest: Hizb al-Tahrir and the Search for the Islamic Caliphate (1996)
- Muslim Identity and the Balkan State (co-edited, 1997)
- Muslim-Jewish Encounters: Intellectual Traditions and Modern Politics (co-edited, 1998)
- Islamic Thought in the Twentieth Century (co-edited, 2004)
- Modern Muslim Intellectuals and the Qur'an (edited, 2004)
- Ibn 'Arabi, A Prayer for Spiritual Elevation and Protection, al-Dawr al-a'la (Hizb al-wiqaya), Study, translation, transliteration and Arabic text (2006)
- Beshara and Ibn ‘Arabi: A Movement of Sufi Spirituality in the Modern World (2007)

== See also ==
- Islamism
- Sufism
- Ibn Arabi
