= Istana Negara attempted shooting =

Failed terrorist attack in Jakarta, Indonesia

- Location: Istana Negara complex, Jalan Medan Merdeka Utara, Central Jakarta, Indonesia
- Date: 25 October 2022 ±07:00 WIB (UTC+7)
- Target: Paspampres; Joko Widodo
- Attack type: Attempted shooting
- Weapon: FN HP-DA Pistol
- Deaths: None
- Injuries: None
- Perpetrator: Radical Hizb ut-Tahrir Indonesia supporter Lone wolf attack indoctrinated by Darul Islam (Indonesia)
- No. of participants: 1
- Motive: Islamic extremism themed messiah complex fueled by anti-Pancasila sentiment and anti-Joko Widodo sentiment

On 25 October 2022, at around 7:00 am Western Indonesia Time (UTC+7), an attempted shooting occurred in front of the Istana Negara in Jakarta, Indonesia. A female assailant trespassed the Istana Negara security layer and attempted to shoot the President and/or Presidential Guard using an FN HP-DA Pistol. President of Indonesia Joko Widodo was not in the Istana Negara at the time of attack as he was visiting East Kalimantan and Nusantara. The assailant was apprehended immediately by the Presidential Guard (Paspampres) and Indonesian National Police on the scene and is currently detained at Metro Jaya Region Police HQ.

On 26 October 2022, after the investigation and checking the databases, National Counter Terrorism Agency announced that the assailant is a Hizb-ut Tahrir Indonesia member, but her terror network affiliation is Darul Islam. Despite the affiliation, further investigation revealed that the attacker is a lone wolf but inspired by Hizb ut-Tahrir Indonesia and Darul Islam teachings.

== Attack ==
The attack involved a lone female assailant who entered the Istana Negara secured area wielding a pistol. The assailant was wearing a black abaya with a blue veil. The pistol used by the assailant was found to be an FN HP-DA pistol. Along with the pistol, police secured her bag contained a copy of the Qur'an, an empty wallet, and a phone. The assailant found to be unstable and "under pressure".

Ridlwan Habib, a University of Indonesia lecturer and terrorist observer, speculated that the assailant is an ISIS-affiliated lone wolf due to similarity of the tactic used by ISIS to attack state authority and use of women as agents. Former Darul Islam activist and terrorist-turned-Anti Darul Islam activist and researcher at NII Crisis Center Ken Setiawan remarked that the assailant is a shallow-minded person brainwashed previously by an anti-government Islamist group after seeing the resulted mental instability of the assailant. He reminded the case is similar to the Indonesian National Police headquarters shooting. Al Chaidar, Malikussaleh University lecturer and Islamic terrorism expert, indicated that the perpetrator, based on his observation to her color of clothing (black abaya and blue veil), indicated she is a new recruit of the Jamaah Ansharut Daulah with less than 3 months inside the group, as the group senior female members or much senior female recruits of the group will use black abaya and black veil.

== Perpetrator ==
It was found that the assailant used many identities and is currently under investigation. Later identification identified the assailant as a 24-year-old woman, who resided in Koja, North Jakarta. The assailant is a housewife. According to the local rukun tetangga head, the assailant is native to the neighborhood, but had been known to be a recluse from a young age. She lived there with her mother, husband, and two children, and all are known to be reclusive. Her husband has worked as employee of a private service bureau, while her extended family, including her older and younger brothers were mariners. She often organized closed majlis ta'lim (religious discussion and Qur'an recitation groups) in her house every night of Saturday inviting outsiders and not cooperated with local residents. For her majlis ta'lim group, she sometimes asked locals to join her group, but often through coercion. At time of the attack, her marriage currently was on the way to be dissolute for an unknown reason. Prior the attack, locals found her always crying out of an unknown reason after she prayed in the mosques near her home. In the aftermath of the attempted attack and as the situation become known to the public, the locals suspected that she was crying because she knew that she was all going to commit such an attack and that she was reluctant to die.

Investigation uncovered that the assailant's motive was to meet Joko Widodo in order to convince him that the country's ideology Pancasila was wrong, and the only thing right was Islam and Islam should be used as the basis of the state. According to the Police, she had received various dreams and visions of destruction, hell, and heaven, and that she would become a savior of the country if she committed the attack and "returned the country to its rightful, Islamic way." Later confession also revealed that the assailant also wanted to assassinate Joko Widodo.

Indonesian National Police launched a raid on her house in aftermath of the attempted attack. The Police secured and confiscated several items from the house for investigation. From her house, several Islamic radical books, 1 FN pistol, 2 air guns, and 1 bladed weapon were confiscated. The ammunitions, live bullets and iron pellets for each weapon were also confiscated. Her family was also relocated by the Police.

Later, the National Counter Terrorism Agency announced that the assailant is a Hizb ut-Tahrir Indonesia member, which was already dissolved by Indonesian government back in 2017. The National Counter Terrorism Agency revealed that the agency already monitored her social media account where she disseminated her views of caliphate, praising Islamic extremism, and caliphate propagandas. Further connection to another terror group is currently under investigation.

Another 2 women were captured by the police in-relation to the attack.

Her husband was arrested after he was found to be a Darul Islam affiliate. Her religious teacher, a Darul Islam member, was arrested for mentoring, indoctrinating, and brainwashing the assailant. Her husband was not involved in indoctrination or influencing the assailant, but he was arrested for being part of the Darul Islam and involved in financing Darul Islam.

Psychological background of the assailant revealed by her family found that the assailant mental state was messed up due to her broken marriage which marked the beginning of her mental instability. Furthermore, she become increasingly religious due to her taking on many religious advice for praying and fasting. It was revealed that her family financial state was hit severely due to COVID-19 pandemic, and she relied to the government's assistance aid payment. Detachment 88 revealed that the assailant had tendency to commit self-harm acts and often to enter a hysterical state when in custody.

== Investigation ==
Investigation was launched as soon as she was detained. The assailant was subsequently transferred to the Detachment 88 custody for investigation.

Detachment 88 also investigated her network based on her social media accounts and device. They found some links to the Hizb ut-Tahrir and Darul Islam accounts in her social media accounts and device history. Detachment 88 also found that the weapon used in the failed attack is real firearm. Based on Detachment 88 investigation, the weapon that was used in the failed attack was legally owned and registered under the assailant's uncle who was a retired officer for the Indonesian National Armed Forces. The weapon was stolen by the assailant a day prior to the attack. Luckily, the weapon was already disabled by her uncle some time before the attack.

Owing to the reportedly broken and mentally unstable state of the assailant, Detachment 88 issued recommendation to forensic psychologist and psychiatrist for investigation. Despite her mental state, Police did not release her and set her as main suspect.

== Responses ==
Head of Metro Jaya Regional Police, Inspector General Fadil Imran, asked the people to not panic as the assailant was already apprehended and in police custody. He assured that the case now in investigation.

Moeldoko, Head of the Executive Office of the President of the Republic of Indonesia, praised the readiness and awareness of the Paspampres and National Police. He requested both security forces to increase their readiness and awareness.

Reza Indragiri Amriel, forensic psychology expert and police observer, asked police to investigate and check the assailant psychology to make sure if this attack is an act of terrorism, hate crime against the authority, or an attempt of suicide by cop. Similar statements was also voiced by Nahdlatul Ulama figure Habib Novel Assegaf.

Ridlwan Habib asked the security apparatuses to increase their readiness and awareness due to the incident happening 20 days before the opening of the upcoming 2022 G20 Bali summit on 15–16 November 2022.

Ruhut Sitompul, a PDI-P politician, lamented the attack and blamed the anti-government Islamist group who brainwashed the assailant.

Nasir Djamil, a Prosperous Justice Party politician and member of the Commission III of People's Representative Council of Prosperous Justice Party faction questioned how the perpetrator is able to enter the Istana Negara security layer. He also criticized the performance of the security officers stationed in Istana Negara and asked the Police to investigate it further. However, he appreciated the security officers for their fast responses in dealing with such situation.

Ishfah Abidal Azis, special staff of the Minister of Religious Affairs, commented that the attack may not happened if the individual learned religion from the reputable teachers, scholars, books, and sources. He emphasized the importance of the moderate, systematic, and comprehensive religious education to prevent such narrow-minded religious radicalism acts.
