= Zeyno Baran =

Turkish-American scholar (born 1972)

Zeyno Baran (born January 31 1972) is a Turkish American scholar on issues ranging from US-Turkey relations to Islamist ideology to energy security in Europe and Asia. She was the Director of the Center for Eurasian Policy and a Senior Fellow at the Hudson Institute, a think tank based in Washington, D.C. From January 2003 until joining the Hudson Institute in April 2006, she worked as the Director of International Security and Energy Programs for the Nixon Center. Baran also worked as the Director of the Caucasus Project at the Center for Strategic and International Studies from 1999 until December 2002.

She is married to Matthew Bryza, the former U.S. Ambassador to Azerbaijan. and has a daughter.

== Opposition to political Islam ==
One of Baran's key areas of specialization is countering the spread of radical Turkish Islamist ideology in Europe and Eurasia. She has worked to foster the tolerant integration of Muslims into Western societies, arguing that the creation of "parallel societies" within a state's broader society will only encourage intolerance and extremism on both sides.

Baran has criticized European and American governments for working too closely with groups or individuals that she claims espouse an Islamist ideology. She argues that such engagement actually works against U.S. and European interests. Baran wrote an article for The Weekly Standard on this very subject. In it, she advocates a kind of "litmus test" for deciding who and what type of Muslim groups the U.S. government should engage with. Baran argues that "the deciding factor must be ideology: Is the group Islamist or not?"

She believes that the Muslim Brotherhood, Hizbullah, and Hizb ut-Tahrir fail her test.

Baran's Hizb ut-Tahrir: Islam's Political Insurgency, published in 2004, asserted that Hizb ut-Tahrir, an international Islamist organization, is a "conveyor belt for radicalism and terrorism." She qualified her statement by saying, "While HT as an organization does not engage in terrorist activities, it has become the vanguard of the radical Islamist ideology that encourages its followers to commit terrorist acts".

== Uzbekistan ==
In 2003 Baran assisted in American efforts to engage with the Uzbek leadership to come up with better strategies to combat HT's hold in Central Asia, writing a monograph on this subject.

In testimony to the Committee on International Relations, Baran argued that simply cutting off relations and terminating financial assistance with Uzbekistan because of the country's human rights abuses would not help foster reforms, and would, in fact, assist Hizb ut-Tahrir. While acknowledging that there are serious violation in Uzbekistan, she asserted that disengaging with the Uzbek government would be counterproductive both on humanitarian grounds and in terms of U.S. strategic interests in Eurasia.

Baran correctly predicted that after U.S. disengagement, China and Russia would embrace Tashkent and whatever limited democratic reform was underway would cease altogether. Baran also foresaw that the Uzbek government would punish the U.S. by revoking the latter's right to use military bases in the country which had been used to facilitate Operation Enduring Freedom in Afghanistan.

== Turkey ==
Baran's research and insights are not limited to Islam, but also her native Turkey. She famously wrote an article in Newsweek on December 4, 2006, stating that the likelihood for a coup in Turkey was "50-50".

This article generated significant controversy and actually prompted a member of the Turkish parliament, Egemen Bagis, to write a letter to the editor of Newsweek in which he refuted her statement. Bagis went on to claim: "The statement belongs to Turkey's then-chief of staff Ismail Hakki Karadayi, who first made the comment in a well-publicized statement to the Turkish daily Sabah (newspaper) in 1996 and repeated it elsewhere in numerous interviews."

Some claim that Baran was vindicated after the nomination of Turkish Foreign Minister Abdullah Gül for President led to significant public protests and the issuance of a cautionary statement from the Turkish General Staff. There were some tensions between the Turkish military and the ruling Justice and Development Party prior to the 2007 elections when the military issued a warning on the website of the Turkish General staff, which has been dubbed "e-warning". This did not prevent a resurgent Justice and Development Party from gaining over 46 percent of the popular vote in the July 2007 elections. There are allegations that the public protests were orchestrated by a clandestine illegal organization named Ergenekon. Alleged members of this organization have been indicted on charges of plotting to foment unrest, among other things by assassinating intellectuals, politicians, judges, military staff, and religious leaders, with the ultimate goal of toppling the pro-Western incumbent government in a coup that was planned to take place in 2009. Hence, the prediction of a coup by Baran may have been based on these developments.

In June 2007, the Hudson Institute conducted an off-the-record alternative futures meeting on the escalation of conflict between Turkey and the PKK. For this meeting, a fictitious scenario was created in which a series of PKK attacks led Turkey to intervene militarily in northern Iraq. The details of this scenario and the content of the meeting were subsequently leaked to the Turkish press, generating a controversy that rivaled the one created by Baran's December 2006 Newsweek article.

These revelations and its ensuing media coverage have given rise to speculation and a number of conspiracy theories. Several high-ranking Turkish government officials have condemned the holding of this meeting as it considered the possibility of a Turkish intervention into Iraq. Prime Minister Recep Tayyip Erdogan denounced the contents of the Hudson scenario as "crazy talk". In a statement released via the Hudson website, Baran has asserted that the purpose of the meeting was "to prevent the PKK from causing further strains in US-Turkey relations" and that those were present at the meeting "stated clearly the need for the US to take concrete action against the PKK." In fact, Turkey has, in Operation Claw and Operation Claw-Lock pursued extended interventions into Iraq and caused civilian casualties.
