= Taqi al-Din al-Nabhani =

Palestinian Muslim scholar (1914–1977)

al-Shaykh Muḥammad Taqī al-Dīn bin Ibrāhīm bin Muṣṭafā bin Ismāʿīl bin Yūsuf al-Nabhānī محمد تقي الدين بن إبراهيم بن مصطفى بن إسماعيل بن يوسف النبهاني
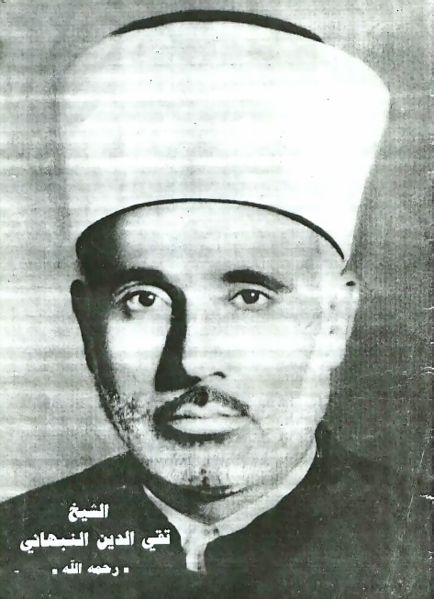
- al-Imām al-Shaykh Muhammad Taqi al-Din bin Ibrāhīm bin Mustafā bin Ismā'īl bin Yūsuf al-Nab'hāni

Leader of Hizb ut-Tahrir
- In office 1953 – December 11, 1977
- Preceded by: Position established
- Succeeded by: Shaykh Abdul Qadeem Zallum

Qadi of Haifa
- In office 1938–1948
- Title: al-Imam, al-Shaykh

Personal life
- Born: Muhammad Taqi al-Din bin Ibrahim bin Mustafa bin Ismail bin Yusuf al-Nabhani; 1914 (Some sources quote it to be 1909) Ijzim, Ottoman Palestine
- Died: December 11, 1977 (aged 62–63) Beirut, Lebanon
- Era: Modern era
- Region: Middle East
- Political party: Hizb ut Tahrir (1953-1977)
- Main interests: Political Islam; Islamic philosophy; Anti-Zionism; Islamic economics; Refuting heresy; Fiqh; Da'wah; Khilafah
- Notable ideas: Pan-Islamism; Sunni Islamism; Islamic Revival; Jihad against Zionists
- Notable work: List: Inqadh Filasteen [Saving Palestine] – 1950; Rislatu al-Arab [Message to the Arabs] – 1950; Nidham al-Islam [The System of Islam] – 1953; Nidham al-Hukm fi al-Islam [The Ruling System in Islam] – 1953; Nidham al-Iqtisadi fi al-Islam [The Economic System in Islam] – 1953; Nidham al-Ijtima’i fi al-Islam [The Social System in Islam] −1953; Takattul al-Hizbi [Party Structure] – 1953; Mahafeem Hizb ut-Tahrir [Concepts of Hizb ut-Tahrir] – 1953; Dawlah al-Islamiyyah [The Islamic State] – 1953; Shakhsiyyah al-Islamiyyah [The Islamic Personality (in three volumes)] – 1960; Muqadimat al-Dustor [Introduction to the Constitution] – 1963; Nida al-Haar ila al-Muslimeen [A Warm Call to the Muslims] – 1965; Mahafeem Siyasiyya li Hizb ut-Tahrir [Political Concepts of Hizb ut-Tahrir] – 1969; Afkar Siyasiyya [Political Thoughts] – 1972; Tafkir [Thinking] – 1973; Sura’t al-Badiha [Presence of Mind] – 1976
- Education: Dar al-Ulum
- Occupation: Islamic scholar

Religious life
- Religion: Islam
- Denomination: Sunni
- Jurisprudence: Ijtihad
- Creed: Ash'ari

Muslim leader
- Teacher
- Disciple of: Imam Yusuf al-Nabhani
- Arabic name
- Personal (Ism): Muhammad محمد
- Patronymic (Nasab): ibn Ibrāhīm ibn Mustafā بن إبراهيم بن مصطفى
- Epithet (Laqab): Taqī al-Dīn تقي الدين
- Toponymic (Nisba): al-Nabhānī النبهاني
- Birth name: Taqī al-Dīn
- Other names: Other name/left empty/none
- Relatives: Imam Yusuf al-Nabhani (maternal grandfather)

Muhammad Taqi al-Din bin Ibrahim bin Mustafa bin Isma'il bin Yusuf al-Nabhani (Arabic: محمد تقي الدين بن إبراهيم بن مصطفى بن إسماعيل بن يوسف النبهاني; 1914 – December 11, 1977) was a Palestinian Islamic scholar who founded the pan-Islamist and fundamentalist organization Hizb ut-Tahrir.

== Biography ==
Al-Nabhani was born in 1909 in a village by the name of Ijzim near Haifa in the Ottoman Empire and belonged to Bani Nabhan tribe. His father was a lecturer in Sharia law, his mother was also an Islamic scholar and his grandfather was the famous Palestinian scholar Yusuf al-Nabhani. al-Nabhani studied Sharia law at al-Azhar University and the Dar-ul-Ulum college of Cairo. He graduated in 1931 and returned to Palestine. There he was first a teacher and then as a jurist, rising to Sharia judge in the court of appeal. Disturbed by the creation of the state of Israel and the 1948 Arab–Israeli War and occupation of Palestine, he founded the Hizb ut-Tahrir party in 1953. The party was immediately banned in Jordan. Al-Nabhani was banned from returning to Jordan and settled in Beirut. He died on December 20, 1977.

== Political philosophy ==
Al-Nabhani proclaimed that the depressed political condition of Muslims in the contemporary world stemmed from the abolition of the Caliphate in 1924. Al-Nabhani was critical of the way the Middle East had been carved up into nation states allied with various imperial powers. Other causes of stagnation included the Ottoman Empire's closing of the doors of ijtihad, its failure to understand "the intellectual and legislative side of Islam", and neglect of the Arabic language.

In his most famous works, written in the early 1950s, al-Nabhani expressed a radical disillusionment with the secular powers that had failed to protect Palestinian nationalism. He argued for a new caliphate that would be brought about by "peaceful politics and ideological subversion" and eventually cover the world replacing all nation states. Its political and economic order would be founded on Islamic principles, not materialism that, in his view, was the outcome of capitalist economies.

Al-Nabhani also wrote The Economic System in Islam, a book on Islamic views on economic principles and the contradictions between them and Western-based capitalism and socialism. It was published in Arabic in 1953 and translated into English and a number of other languages.

== Influence ==
Hizb ut-Tahrir did not attract a large following in the countries where it was established. Despite this, al-Nabhani's works have become an important part of contemporary Islamist literature.

== Bibliography ==
- al-Nabhani, Taqi al-Din (2002), The System of Islam Nidham al-Islam, London: al-Khilafah Publications
- al-Nabhani, Taqi al-Din (2004), Thought al-Tafkeer, London: al-Khilafah Publications
- al-Nabhani, Taqi al-Din (2005), Islamic Personality al-Shaksiyyah al-Islamiyyah, London: al-Khilafah Publications}
