= Sadakat Kadri =

Lawyer, author, travel writer and journalist

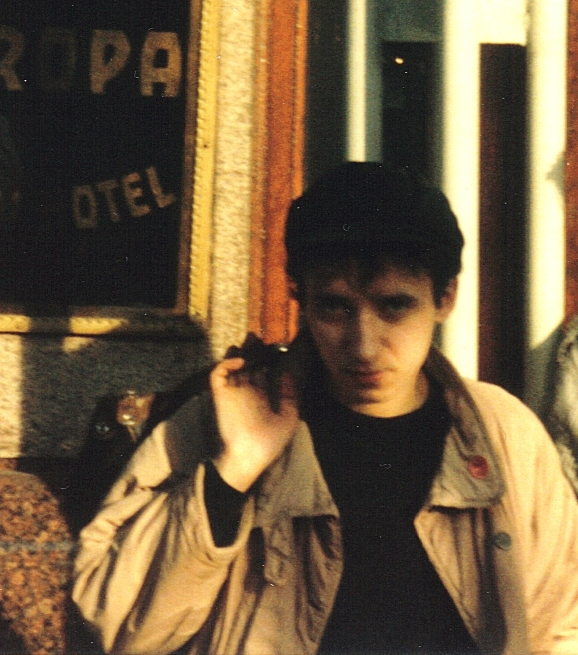
Kadri in Prague, 1989

Sadakat Kadri (born 1964 in London) is a lawyer, author, travel writer and journalist. One of his foremost roles as a barrister was to assist in the prosecution of former Malawian president Hastings Banda. As a member of the New York Bar he has worked as a volunteer with the American Civil Liberties Union. He has also specialised in freedom of information issues.

He currently lives in London and writes law-based articles for the British current affairs magazine New Statesman, and the London Review of Books.

== Early life and education ==
Born in London in 1964 of Pakistani and Finnish parents, Kadri studied history and law at Trinity College, Cambridge, where he graduated with a first, and has a master's degree from Harvard Law School.

== Career ==
Kadri's parallel travel writing career started with a visit to Prague during the 1989 Velvet Revolution, as one of only a handful of 'non-journalists' who actually observed the reality of the changes without being hamstrung by press conferences and filing deadlines. He stayed on in Prague for two years to pen the groundbreaking Cadogan Guide to that city. His 2005 book, The Trial: A History, from Socrates to O. J. Simpson was written after two and a half years spent in Manhattan, having arrived shortly before September 11, 2001. He was inspired to write his 2012 work Heaven on Earth, by the September 11, 2001 and July 7, 2005 bombings. Critics have called that book "extremely valuable" and "entertaining", "carefully researched", and "thorough and admirable".

== Selected works ==
- 1991: Prague, Cadogan city guides, ISBN 978-1-86011-214-0
- 2005: The Trial: A History, from Socrates to O. J. Simpson, ISBN 978-0-375-50550-8
- 2012: Heaven on Earth: A Journey Through Shari'a Law from the Deserts of Ancient Arabia to the Streets of the Modern Muslim World, ISBN 978-0-374-16872-8
