= Hizb ut-Tahrir =

Pan-Islamist and fundamentalist organization

Hizb ut-Tahrir حزب التحرير
- Leader: Ata Abu Rashta
- Founder: Taqi al-Din al-Nabhani
- Founded: 1953 in East Jerusalem, Jordan
- Headquarters: Beirut, Lebanon
- Membership: 10,000 – 1 million
- Ideology: Pan-Islamism; Islamism; Muslim supremacism; Caliphalism; Salafism; Jihadism; Desecularization; Anti-Western sentiment; Anti-nationalism; Antisemitism; Anti-Zionism; Anti-democracy; Anti-liberalism; Anti-capitalism; Anti-communism; Political unitarism
- Political position: Far-right
- Religion: Sunni Islam

Party flag

Website
- hizb-ut-tahrir.org

Hizb ut-Tahrir (HT; Arabic: حِزْبُ الْتَّحْرِير, romanized: Ḥizbu t-Taḥrīr, lit. 'Party of Liberation') is an international pan-Islamist and Islamic fundamentalist political organization whose stated aim is the re-establishment of the Islamic caliphate to unite the Muslim community (called ummah) and implement sharia globally. (Note: From HT pamphlet: "In the forthcoming days the Muslims will conquer Rome and the dominion of the Ummah of Muhammad (peace and blessings be upon him and his family) will reach the whole world and the rule of the Muslims will reach as far as the day and night. And the Dīn of Muhammad (saw) will prevail over all other ways of life including Western Capitalism and the culture of Western Liberalism.") (Note: Founder An-Nabhani describes expansion in terms of following the example of the early Muslim salaf's invasion and conquest of Persia and Byzantium: "[S]he struck them both [Persia and Byzantium] simultaneously, conquered their lands and spread Islam over almost the whole of the inhabited parts of the world at that time, then what are we to say about the Ummah today; numbering more than one billion ... She would undoubtedly constitute a front which would be stronger in every respect than the leading superpowers put together.")

Hizb ut-Tahrir was founded in 1953 as a political organization in then-Jordanian-controlled Jerusalem by Taqi al-Din al-Nabhani, a Palestinian Islamic scholar from Haifa who was educated in Egypt and served as a qadi (religious court judge) in Mandatory Palestine. He formulated a program and a "draft constitution" for the establishment of a Caliphate. The organization sees world history as an eternal conflict between Islam and non-believers, with the state system considered a historical assault on Islam. The group views Jihad as an essential aspect of its vision and considers it an imperative duty aimed at combating disbelief until all submit to Islamic rule, making no distinction between the violent and spiritual dimensions of Jihad. As an initial step, HT directs attention to the 'near enemy', advocating the removal of rulers "pretending to be Muslims", a step they consider a prerequisite for the global spread of Islam.

Since 1953, Hizb ut-Tahrir has spread to more than 50 countries, and has a membership estimated to be between "tens of thousands" to "about one million". Hizb ut-Tahrir is active in Western countries, including the UK, and also in several Arab and Central Asian countries despite being banned by some governments. Members typically meet in small private study circles, but in countries where the group is not illegal, it also engages with the media and organizes rallies and conferences. The organization's leadership is centered in Jordan, with additional headquarters in London. This dual presence leverages the relative freedom in Europe to oversee activities in Muslim nations where HT faces more stringent restrictions.

Hizb ut-Tahrir has been banned in Bangladesh, China, Russia, Pakistan, India, Germany, Turkey, the United Kingdom, Kazakhstan and "across Central Asia", Indonesia, Australia, and all Arab countries except Lebanon, Yemen and the UAE. In July 2017, the Indonesian government revoked Hizb ut-Tahrir's legal status, citing incompatibility with government regulations on extremism and national ideology.

== Goals, methods, and organization ==
Time	Timeline of significant events
1953	Founding by Taqi al-Din al-Nabhani in Jerusalem.
1960	HT begins "Interaction Stage" in Jordan. Society is unresponsive. Party revises its method.
1961	HT adopts the method of seeking support from the influential faction(s) to assume power, specifically by gaining sympathy and protection from within the army to conduct a coup or nussrah. The party also sends experienced members to seek support in Syria and Iraq.
1964	forcing it to attempt to take power in that country.
1968/69	HT allegedly involved in two failed coup attempts in Jordan and Syria.
1970	Several coup attempts having failed, HT Party efforts "come to a standstill" until 1980.
1974	HT are allegedly involved in a failed coup attempt in Egypt.
1977	Founder and leader Taqi al-Din al-Nabhani dies in Lebanon. He is succeeded by Abdul Qadeem Zallum, also a Palestinian cleric.
1978	HT declares that the Muslims had reached a state of total surrender and despair and are not responding to its call. The party acknowledges that this has caused activity to decline almost to a standstill, mainly due to misconceptions.
1979	Ayatollah Khomeini, leader of the Iranian Islamic Revolution, was asked to reestablish the caliphate, but Khomeini ignored HT's request. (The party later denounced him as an American agent.)
1980	Party leadership states that although seeking nussrah is vital, members should remember that the attainment of power also depends upon gaining popular support.
1989; December	Start of party moving away from a strict non-violence stance, 22 December 1989 conference report discusses the theological foundations of "armed insurrection against any 'unfaithful' government".
1996–97	Internal dispute known as "the Redress". Dissident members accuse the leadership of Abdul Qadeem Zallum of deviating from party principles. Dissenters are led by Abu Rami, a veteran member from the party inner circle. Four different "camps" develop.
1998	HT declares that the Caliphate is now the wish of all the Muslims.
2001; June	Moving in a more confident and radical direction (according to Zeyno Baran), HT states in its Al-Waie journal that it is "permissible" to carry out suicide attacks with explosive belts.
2003; March	79-year-old leader Abdul Qadeem Zallum retires as leader, succeeded by Ata Khalil Abu-Rashta, a Palestinian civil engineer, who leads HT on a more aggressive course.; The US-led invasion of Iraq begins. The invasion and subsequent occupation helps HT by raising consciousness among Muslims of a "global umma" and by lowering Muslims' opinion of the United States – the leader of the invasion and (according to HT) the "head of Kufr".
2010–2016	The party works to ignite the Syrian Revolution and heavily invests in it, hoping that the revolutionary fighters would unite under HT's Islamic umbrella and agree upon an Islamic Caliphate.

Hizb ut-Tahrir states its aim as unification of all Muslim countries (or as it calls them "Islamic lands") (Note: By HT definition, 'Islamic lands' include Muslim-majority countries, 'even if it had not been ruled by Muslims', and non-Muslim majority countries that were once 'ruled by Muslims under the authority of Islam.' "[L]ands that were ruled by Muslims under the authority of Islam and the rules of Islam were applied on them. ... This means the rules regarding the lands of such countries remain as they were when they were under the authority of Islam. ... Also any land, in which there is a Muslim majority, even if it had not been ruled by Muslims, it will be considered as Islamic land because its people have embraced Islam over it.") over time in a unitary Islamic state or caliphate, headed by a caliph elected by Muslims. This, it holds, is an obligation decreed by God, warning that Allah will punish those Muslims "who neglect this duty". Once established, the caliphate will expand into non-Muslim areas, through "invitation" and through military jihad, so as to expand the land of Islam and diminish the land of unbelief. To "achieve its objective" HT seeks "to gain the leadership of the Islamic community" so that the community will "accept it as her [the community's] leader, to implement Islam upon her and proceed with it in her struggle against the Kuffar (unbelievers) and in the work towards the return of the Islamic State".

The nature of the "Islamic state"/caliphate/khilafah is spelled out in a detailed program and "draft constitution" which notes the caliphate being a unitary state,, opposing federalism in the process, run by a caliph acting as head of state elected by Muslims. Other specified features include: "The currency of the State is to be restricted to gold and silver"—article 163; "every male Muslim, fifteen years and over, is obliged to undergo military training"—article 56; "Arabic is the language of Islam and the sole language of the State"—article 8; in marriage the wife is "obliged to obey her husband" and the husband "to provide"—article 116, in schools "the weekly lessons of Islamic disciplines and Arabic language must be equal to the lessons of all other sciences in terms of number and time"—article 173. Such things as copyrights on educational materials (article 175), military treaties (article 185), and memberships by the state in secular international organizations (article 186) are forbidden by the constitution. (Note: The draft constitution can be found in the book "The System of Islam" by Hizbut Tahrir founder al-Nabhani, where it takes up a chapter of the book, or in a download "The Draft Constitution of the Khilafah State Hizb ut-Tahrir". A slightly different version of the constitution can be found at Khilafah.com (published in 2013 and described as a "translation of the revised Draft Constitution of the Khilafah State published by Hizb ut-Tahrir in 2010"). The two constitutions are different in that the newer version has more articles (191 vs. 186) and some changes in the location and substance of the articles (13 instead of just eight "institutions" in the "State systems", more detailed process for appointing the caliph, including new articles added about appointing a temporary amir (art. 33), and requiring that "The weekly lessons of Islamic disciplines and Arabic language must be equal to the lessons of all other sciences in terms of number and time" (art. 173), etc.). In this article the numbers of the articles of the constitution refer to the original/earlier version of the constitution.) In addition to the constitution, "many detailed books" expand on the HT ideology and "method of work", according to its 2010 Information pack.

Although hizb means party in Arabic, in the countries where Hizb ut-Tahrir is active it has not registered as a political party or attempted to elect candidates to political office, although it did early in its history. (Note: According to J. P. Filiu, HT abandoned elections after being expelled from Syria in the late 1950s or 1960s.) Hizb ut-Tahrir put forward candidates for office in Jordan in the 1950s when it was first formed and before it was banned, according to Suha Taji-Farouki. Kyrgyz Hizb ut-Tahrir members campaigned unsuccessfully for an affiliated candidate in Kyrgyzstan's national presidential election in July 2005, and have participated in municipal elections where their followers have won in a number of regions. Olivier Roy describes the strategy as a "global, grassroots revolution, culminating in a sudden, millenarian victory", as opposed to a slog through a political process "that risks debasing the Koran and perpetuating the ummah's subjugation to the West".

The party plans its political progress in three stages, taking after the process "by which the Prophet Muhammad established the Caliphate in thirteen years". According to an analyst of Hizb ut-Tahrir in Kazakhstan, where the group is outlawed: "First they convert new members. Secondly, they establish a network of secret cells, and finally, they try to infiltrate the government to work to legalize their party and its aims." A more sympathetic description of this strategy is that Hizb ut-Tahrir works to:

1. Establish groups of elite citizens as a community of Hizb ut-Tahrir members who carry the da'wah to Muslim societies to support an Islamic state. Members should accept the goals and methods of the organization as their own and be ready to work to fulfill these goals. (This process of building a party attempts to copy Muhammad's work in Mecca where he built a core of supporters.)
2. Build public opinion among the Muslim masses for the caliphate and the other Islamic concepts that will lead to a revival of Islamic thought. (This process of what the party calls "intellectual transformation through political and cultural interaction", attempts to imitate Muhmmad's using his core of supporters to win over the population of Mecca and later Medina.) "Stage two involves penetration into government positions and military special forces", according to HT critic Zeyno Baran. For some members this will involve "drink[ing] alcohol and chang[ing] their behavior in other ways to blend in with secular elites". (Note: Information provided by "a senior Jordanian government official".)
3. The government would be replaced by one that implements Islam "generally and comprehensively", carrying Islamic thought to people throughout the world.

HT has for many years made use of the Internet to propagate its message. It changes messages frequently, and uses a number of languages. As of 2004, there were at least seven websites related directly to HT.

HT talks about a "bloodless" coup, or nussrah, for the facilitation of "a change of the government". In one document ('Our Method'), it states, "we consider that Islamic law forbids violence or armed struggle against the regime as a method to reestablish the Islamic State." A 2004 report by the Nixon Center states that "credible reports" indicate that HT members have been "involved in coup attempts in Jordan, Syria, Egypt, Tunisia and Iraq". According to HT, once one or more Muslim countries come under the organization's control (such as Pakistan, Indonesia or a country in Central Asia) this will create a base; subsequently, other Muslim countries will be convinced to join and a "domino effect" will be created to establish a new caliphate.

Researchers and scholars have described HT as a vanguard party (David Commins (Note: The "insistence on the necessity of a vanguard Islamist party" to bring about "political transformation" and to "safeguard the achievements of Islamic revolution", "perhaps the most notable feature" of HT founder An-Nabhani's program.) and Zeyno Baran (Note: Describes the party as a "vanguard party." because he states it is interested in achieving power through "hundreds of supporters in critical positions" rather than "thousands of foot soldiers".)) or as seeming to be "less interested in a broad mass following than a smaller more committed core of members" (BBC (Note: BBC program on the group's activities in Indonesia, stated that "unlike many other" Islamist movements in that country, Hizb ut-Tahrir "seems less interested in a broad mass following than a smaller more committed core of members, many of them drawn from Indonesia's educated middle classes".)). The "About Us" section of the Hizb ut-Tahrir official website states "Hizb ut-Tahrir is determined to work within the Ummah in order to implement Islam and achieve its objective by endeavouring to gain the leadership of the Islamic Ummah so that she could accept it as her leader, to implement Islam upon her and proceed with it in her struggle against the Kuffar". (Note: (at the bottom of the statement, as of 31 March 2016)) But according to a former leader in the UK, Jalaluddin Patel, once the caliphate has been established, HT "will never assume the role of a vanguard party".

In countries where the party is outlawed, Hizb ut-Tahrir's organization is said to be strongly centralized, with its central leadership based in the Palestinian Territories. To avoid infiltration by security agents and maintain ideological coherence in a pyramid-like group, the party enforces internal discipline and obedience to the central leadership. The party "tolerates no internal dissent". A range of disciplinary measures are applied to members who break the rules, with expulsion being the most severe. The network of underground cells resembles that of the successful Bolshevik revolutionaries in Russia. At the top is the central committee (lajnat al-qiyada) of the international party, and the supreme leader (Amir). The main committee or agency is tasked with taking power to re-establish the caliphate by establishing contacts with "the centers of power such as the army and the political leaders". This agency is "the most secretive", and "reports directly" to the "Amir". (Note: Information provided by "a senior Jordanian government official".)

Organizationally below its center are national organizations or wilayas (which actually means "province" since HT believes that nation states are un-Islamic; the only "nation" is the Islamic community), "usually headed by a group of 12, control networks of local committees and cells". Wilayas have an executive committee charged with managing administrative affairs which is elected every two years by the membership of the party in the wilaya. At the provincial level, there is a committee headed by a provincial representative (Mu'tamad) who oversees group activities. The Mu'tamad is appointed by the central committee.

The basic unit of the party is a cell of five members, the leader of which is the mushrif. The mushrif leads a study-circle, teaches HT ideology, and organizes readings from books by Nabhani, particularly Nidham al-Islam, or the System of Islam, which lay out his vision of an 'Islamic' state" and refutes other Arab political ideologies. Where the party is not legal, only the mushrif knows the names of members of other cells. A candidate for membership swears an oath of loyalty (qasam)

In the name of Allah, I swear to protect Islam and to maintain fidelity to it; I swear to accept and follow goals, ideas and principles of HT in words and deeds; I swear to recognize the rightness of the party leadership's actions; I swear to carry out even those decisions of the party leaders that I find objectionable; I swear to direct all my energies for the realization of the party program. Allah is the Witness of my words.

According to one study, little is known of how HT funds its activities thanks to the party's "clandestine modus operandi". In Western countries, members who have jobs contribute part of their income, possibly as much as 10 percent. In Muslim countries funding may or may not come from Iran, the Gulf States and Saudi Arabia.

Because it is banned in most Muslim-majority countries but legal throughout Western countries, the group differs from most Salafi organizations in being "more self-conscious, adaptive and sensitive to Western culture" despite its resolute opposition to that culture.

HT has been called "secretive and hierarchical" by a former member. It uses "cover names for reserving venues, publishing propaganda and even carrying out political activity" even where it is legal. At least one former member has complained that the HT "party philosophy" and practice of referring to its study groups as halaqa—despite the fact they are studying leader Nabhani's writings and not the Quran—makes Nabhani's work "synonymous with the Quran", and that "the cult-like structure of the organisation [makes] this difficult" for young recruits to see. While one media pack published by HT emphasizes that membership "is open to all Muslim men and women regardless of their nationality, race or school of thought", critics complain of the party's need for "absolute, unequivocal acceptance of the Movement's dogma", its ignoring of spiritual aspects of Islam, and discouraging of free airing of views or "challenging statements".

The party principle of overthrowing existing Muslim governments has been questioned as a violation of the ayah:

Obey God, obey His prophet, and obey those in authority over you.

— Quran 4:59

This is supported by "several notable scholars"—according to Mateen Siddiqui—such as Ibn Nujaym, Al-Bahjouri, and Abu Hanifa. (Note: Excerpted from a judicial ruling (fatwa) issued by Sheikh Hisham Kabbani, Chairman, Islamic Supreme Council of America; and by Sheikh Seraj Hendricks, Mufti, Cape Town, South Africa.) Critics also note a pattern of "a brief spell of support" followed by "failure to take power" in HT's more than 50 years of agitation. (Note: After a crackdown of HT and the arrest of a brigadier in the military in Pakistan in 2011, an ex-HT member, Rashad Ali, stated: "The failure of the Hizb to take power after gaining a brief spell of support is playing itself out again, as it did in the Middle Eastern countries in the 60s and 70s.")

== Positions and policies ==
The party has been described as being "centralised" (Note: HT's ideology and strategy are centralised. HT global leadership issues strategy communiqués to the executive committees of national branches) in leadership and strategy, (Note: former HT Britain leader Jalaluddin Patel.) with its ideology based on the writings of its deceased founder al-Nabhani. Because these principles have been in place since the party's founding, they are therefore considered unlikely to change. (Note: "The doctrine of Hizb ut-Tahrir has not changed in the last fifty years, and it regularly provides alternative Islamic views on contemporary issues. In fact, an-Nabhani's writings constitute the basis for Hizb ut-Tahrir's ideological platform and any major changes would undermine the essence of the party.") The party itself claims its "ideology and its method of work" has been "meticulously thought out and published in many detailed books". (Note: "Hizb ut-Tahrir's ideology and its method of work has been meticulously thought out and published in many detailed books; including one on the subject of thinking itself. We have published a draft constitution for the coming Khilafah State, and this along with many of our books is available in the English language." The party quotes Oxford Analytica 2008 in the Information Pack: "Hizb ut-Tahrir has remained remarkably consistent in ideology and strategy.") Prospective HT members study the "core books" of HT in preparation for being accepted as members. Hizb ut-Tahrir websites, speeches, etc. also detail party positions.

Critics have pointed out differences between party texts and public statements and accused HT of varying its "message to suit different audiences", or of attempting to "soften" its public image (by deleting pamphlets from its website and other means), "as a defensive reaction to increased scrutiny", while leaving its original strategy and ideology untouched. HT itself claims there is "a lot of ... propaganda and disinformation" about the party and the caliphate being spread by enemies to "demonise" HT.

=== Draft Constitution ===
The HT Draft Constitution or "proposed constitution", which contains many party positions, has been described by one party leader, Jalaluddin Patel, (Note: Description by Jalaluddin Patel (leader at the time of Hizb ut-Tahrir Britain) in a 2004 interview with Mahan Abedin of the Jamestown Foundation think tank.) as "the sum of all the work and research" the party has "done in this field", "based on Ijtihad", interpretations of Islamic texts and traditions, schools of fiqh and individual scholars (including Shi'a) and consultation with "various Islamic groups around the world". Patel also told Jamestown that if "the future Caliph" is not a member of HT, the party will offer the constitution to him as a "working document" which he can "accept, amend or indeed reject in favor of his own opinion and Ijtihad (interpretation)".

=== Khilafah/Caliphate and Islam ===
==== Caliphate ====
Hizb ut-Tahrir texts and websites hold that re-establishing the Khilafah state or Caliphate based on sharia law has been decreed by God as the "most important" obligation of Muslims, who will be punished if they neglect it. Without the caliphate and true sharia law, Muslims have been living in a state of jahiliyya (pre-Islamic ignorance). "Not a single country or state" has escaped jahilayya and unbelief, including ones that consider themselves to be Islamic states, such as the Kingdom of Saudi Arabia and the Islamic Republic of Iran. These and all other Muslim-majority states and polities—Kurds, Turks, Iran, Saudi Arabia, etc.—serve as "agents" of a non-Muslim power—usually of the United States—and, their anti-American rhetoric and policies and their fighting amongst each other notwithstanding, they are actually "working harmoniously within US policy".

One HT website (HT Britain) states that the Caliphate "dominated 95% of Islamic history" as a "stable, independent, accountable and representative state", and that the party goals of unifying all Islamic countries into a single Islamic state where sharia law is strictly applied have strong support in the Muslim world. The caliphate will bring stability, the party argues: by providing a political system that is "accountable" and a ruler who is legitimized by virtue of elected representation; by returning the Muslim world to Islamic practice and traditional readings of Islamic values and history; and by virtue of it being "the only institution able to provide credible leadership on Islamic issues and for Muslims".

The ruler of the caliphate, the Caliph (or Khaleefah), should be elected, not chosen through blood lines or imposed on Muslims, according to the Hizb ut-Tahrir Draft Constitution, and should take a pledge of loyalty (ba'iah) to the Muslim community following his election. The Muslim community would have "no right to dismiss him after he has legitimately attained the ba'iah of contracting".

HT sources (an HT "Information Pack" issued to British media by HT Britain circa 2010 and the HT Britain magazine New Civilisation) describe the ruler of the proposed caliphate as "an elected and accountable ruler" and a "servant to the masses, governing them with justice", "legitimate only through popular consent", who can be removed at the demand of the people through "the independent judiciary" of the caliphate, and whose judicial opinion on adopting a law does not prevent further debate and amendment. Along with "an independent judiciary, political parties" and the elected representative of the Majlis al-Umma ("the council of the Muslim community", whose decisions are binding on the Caliph according to Nabhani's book, Nethaam al-Huqm fil-Islam), the caliph rules a state that is uniquely representative, that will provide "rule of law and equal rights for minority groups", and so bears no "resemblance to a totalitarian state", criticism notwithstanding.

But critics complain that the HT draft constitution describes the Caliph as simply "the State". The constitution states that the Caliph "possesses all the powers and function of the State", appointing and dismissing the governors and assistants of all the provinces of caliphate, the directors of departments, the heads of the armed forces and the generals, the chief judge and most judges, "who are all responsible to the Khaleefah [Caliph] and not to the Majlis al-Ummah" (according to Article 35e of the constitution). The founder an-Nabhani, in his book the System of Islam, specifically notes that the shura (consultative) body of the caliphate (the Majlis al-Ummah), "is for seeking the opinion and not for ruling", so that if the Caliph neglects the majlis "he would be negligent, but the ruling system would still remain Islamic. This is because of the shura (consultation) in Islam. This is contrary to the parliamentary system in democracy."

There is also no limitation on the Khaleefah's period in office, "so as long as he abides by the sharia". Critics (Houriya Ahmed and Hannah Stuart of The Centre for Social Cohesion) complain that non-Muslims living the caliphate are not included among those giving "popular consent" nor able to serve in the government, while the judges ruling over any recall attempt of the caliph are appointed by him or by a judge (the Supreme Judge) who is appointed by the Caliph. (Note: The draft constitution stipulates that all judges in the caliphate (who must be Muslim males) are appointed and dismissed solely by either the Caliph or the Qadi al-Qudaa (Supreme Judge) who is appointed by the Caliph.) Regarding debate and amendment of legal rulings of the caliph, articles 3 and 35a of the proposed constitution stipulate that they must be obeyed. One issue not open to "popular consent" or differing opinion (according to HT doctrine) is seceding from the Caliphate. According to the second Amir of the party, "preventing the dismemberment of any country from the body of the Khilafah" is imperative, "even if" it leads "to several years of fighting and ... the killing of millions of Muslims".

==== Islamic lands ====
"Islamic lands" to make up the HT Caliphate include not only Muslim-majority countries but also Muslim-majority regions such as Xinjiang, the Caucasus, and Kazan (in Russia), even though they have been part of non-Muslim countries for many years; and states/regions which have had a non-Muslim majority population for many years such as northern India, East Timor, southern Spain, Sicily, Crimea, Serbia, Croatia, Greece, Romania, Bulgaria, Myanmar and the Philippines—that were once "ruled by Muslims under the authority of Islam".

HT founder an-Nabhani, explains that while some believe that a country "whose population is of non-Muslims", like Spain, "is not an Islamic country; ... This conclusion is false. ... because a country is deemed Islamic if it was once ruled by Islam or if the majority of its population is of Muslims." So that "Spain is indeed an Islamic country".

==== Expansion to non-Muslim lands ====
Hizb ut-Tahrir sees the Caliphate as eventually replacing not only Muslim states but Western non-Muslim ones, but whether it calls for violence to achieve this is disputed. The HT "Information Pack" for the Britain Media states that "the suggestion that Hizb ut-Tahrir will be permitted to engage in an armed struggle when the Caliphate re-emerges, is absolutely false", (Note: The two statement are not actually in contradiction as media pack does not say the Caliphate that HT wants to create will not "engage in an armed struggle", only that the party itself will not.) but Michael Whine (Note: Michael Whine, Government and International Affairs Director at the Community Security Trust (the defense agency of the UK Jewish community)) quotes HT founder An-Nabhani urging Muslims to follow the example of the original Islamic empire attacking and conquering adjacent territory of Persia and the Byzantine Empire, noting "what are we to say about the Ummah today; numbering more than one billion, ... She would undoubtedly constitute a front which would be stronger in every respect than the leading superpowers put together". Another HT text (The Ummah's Charter, quoted by Ahmed and Stuart), states that the Caliphate "must rise to declare Jihad against the Kuffar without any lenience or hesitation", and a HT pamphlet (quoted by Dave Rich) predicts, "In the forthcoming days the Muslims will conquer Rome and the dominion of the Ummah of Muhammad (peace and blessings be upon him and his family) will reach the whole world and the rule of the Muslims will reach as far as the day and night. And the Dīn of Muhammad (saw) will prevail over all other ways of life including Western Capitalism and the culture of Western Liberalism".

==== Criticism ====
Among the criticisms of HT's vision of the caliphate are historical inaccuracy and danger of violence involved in re-establishing the caliphate:

- The historical Abbasid and Ottoman caliphates were "ignored or opposed by five of the civilizations [HT] seemed to think it had governed" (legal historian Sadakat Kadri). (Note: Namely, Umayyad Andalusia, Fatimid Egypt, Safavid Persia, Timurid Kharasan, and Mughal India.)
- Eras of great Islamic cultural achievement occurred not under rulers who strictly applied Sharia, but "under open-minded rulers whom the group would consider heretical: the Mu'tazilite caliphs and Shi'a sultans of the ninth and tenth-century Baghdad, for example and the eclectic emperors who emerged out of Anatolia, Persia, and central Asia after the Mongol invasions" (Sadakat Kadri).
- "During its heyday" the society of the Abbasid caliphate "thrived on multiculturalism, science, innovation, learning and culture", not strict enforcement of sharia, and had famous free thinkers (Al-Maʿarri) and irreverent, impious poets (namely Abu Nuwas) (journalist Khaled Diab). (Note: Abu Nuwas was not only celebrated but, as a Hizb ut-Tahrir reply points out, was forced to flee Baghdad at one point for his writings, and spent time in prison.)
- Rather than being protected and purified by the caliphate, the religion of Islam "throughout Muslim history has operated as an alternative, in tension with the caliphate: it was a repository of ideals of justice and equity, and its purpose was to speak the truth to the vainglory of institutions of power" (Ziauddin Sardar).
- It seems dubious that "security, safety and peace in the Muslim world" would come about "through the forceful removal of all current Muslim governments" in the creation of a unified caliphal state, especially in light of Abdul Qadeem Zallum's statement in a "party text" that "if necessary millions of Muslims and non-Muslims will be killed".

==== Defence ====
Responsibility for defense in Hizb ut-Tahrir's constitutional vision of the caliphate would go to the Amir al-Jihad who would be "the supervisor and director" of four governmental departments comprising "the army, the police, equipment, tasks, armament supplies", internal security, foreign affairs, and industry ("all factories of whatever type should be established on the basis of the military policy"). The Amir al-Jihad does not serve as the commander-in-chief, who, along with his immediate subordinates, is appointed by the Caliph. Conscription is compulsory for all male Muslims 15 and over in the proposed state "in readiness for jihad".

==== Economy ====
The draft constitution also details an economic system that allows private enterprise, but requires that "the State" should "provide employment" and "basic needs" for its citizens. To provide for this the state will draw from "permanent" sources of income from special taxes on non-Muslims: spoils or fei' (spoils of jihad when the non-Muslim enemy has surrendered or fled), jizyah (a poll tax on non-Muslims), and kharaj (land conquered from non-Muslims in jihad). It also includes a "tax" of one/fifth of discovered buried treasure (rikaaz) and zakaah (annual Islamic charitable donation of 2.5% of a Muslim's total savings and wealth excluding a minimum amount) and other taxes if necessary.

The constitution also reserves public ownership of utilities, public transport, health care, energy resources such as oil, and unused farm land. Constitutionally forbidden activities include: "squandering, extravagance and miserliness", "capitalist companies, co-operatives", usury (riba), "fraud, monopolies, gambling and the like", leasing of land for agriculture, and the failure of a land owner to use their land (such as leaving land fallow for more than three years). For monetary policy, the constitution calls for use of the Gold Standard, and gold and silver coinage.

Outsider observers have called HT's economic proposals "very vague" (International Crisis Group), or lacking in coherence (Ahmed & Stuart, Zeyno Baran). Former HT UK leader Jalaluddin Patel defends it, writing that "the Islamic economic system comes from the Creator", who has "better insight into the human condition than humans".

==== Jihad ====
HT texts define Jihad as "war undertaken for the sake of Allah (swt) to raise high His (swt) (Note: Subhanahu wa ta'ala, which means glorified is Allah. It is an expression of honour written after the name Allah.) word" and requiring an army (Institutions of State in the Khilafah). They declare the necessity of jihad so that Da'wah will be carried "to all mankind" and will "bring them into the Khilafah state", and the importance of declaring "Jihad against the Kuffar without any lenience or hesitation" (Ummah's Charter), as well as the need to fight unbelievers who refuse to be ruled by Islam, even if they pay tribute (The Islamic Personality).

On the other hand, public statements by Hizb ut-Tahrir deny this by saying "Hizb ut-Tahrir will be permitted to engage in an armed struggle when the Caliphate re-emerges, ... The party is not waiting for any order to begin an 'armed struggle'". (Note: Again, the media pack statement is not actually in contradiction with the texts, because the media pack never says the Caliphate will not "engage in an armed struggle", only that the party itself will not.)

Other HT texts differ over whether jihad is by nature offensive rather than defensive (supported in The Inevitability of the Clash of Civilisations), or encompasses both "defensive and offensive war" (supported on a different page of The Inevitability of the Clash of Civilisations). Statements also conflict as to whether offensive jihad must wait for the caliphate to be established (as the head of HT Britain, Jalaluddin Patel, told an interviewer in 2004), or requires only an "amir" to lead Muslims (Hizb ut-Tahrir pamphlet). The party does support "defensive jihad" in Iraq and Afghanistan against American occupation—defensive jihad not requiring the "appropriate political and military capabilities" of an Islamic State, it need not wait for either a caliph or amir.

==== Shariah ====
Along with the establishment of an Islamic State, Hizb ut-Tahrir's other main principle/objective is the enforcement of shariah law to regulate all aspects of human life— politics, economics, sciences, and ethics. The law will be based upon fair interpretations of the Qur'an, the Sunnah, consensus of the companions (Ijma al-Sahaba), and legitimate analogies (Qiyas) drawn from those three sources. The Islamic state will not "adopt a particular" Madhhab (school of fiqh). (Note: The caliphate would "strive to represent the diversity inherent in Islam".) According to Forum 18 News Service, it was told by an HT representative that "the only true Muslims" are those who adhere to one of the four Sunni madhhabs, and "those who depart" the four "would be considered as apostates and liable to punishment according to Islamic law".

Regarding traditional hudud penal code, the HT text Concepts of Hizb ut-Tahrir describes their abandonment as part of the "misinterpret[ation of] the Islamic rules to adapt them to contemporary life" that started in the late 19th century. In a HT video on how Muslims should answer criticism of the "harsh" punishments of hudud, HT member Taji Mustafa argues chopping off hands and feet "are a huge deterrent" to crime. HT texts state adultery should be punished by stoning and pre-marital sex by lashing, and apostasy from Islam by death. "Brigandage" and murder would be punished by execution, crucifixion or amputation. (Note: "In regards to those that use violence, such as the highway robbers, who attack people, forcibly obstruct the highways, steal property and kill, the department of internal security will despatch a police force to pursue them and impose the relevant punishment upon them, which may be killing and crucifying, amputating their opposite limbs, or deporting them to another place ...") That use of the punishments of 'chopping off' of hands for theft and stoning to death for adultery would become law in the HT caliphate was confirmed in a 2009 interview of Tayyib Muqeem, an HT leader.

Non-Muslims would be subject to the same laws and in addition would be subject to special taxes—the poll tax of jizya and the land tax of Kharaj. Men and women are to be segregated in public except when absolutely necessary according to HT Draft Constitution. A women's body may not be revealed, "apart from her face and hands". This was also reaffirmed by HT leader Tayyib Muqeem in a 2009 interview – "Every woman would have to cover up." (See below for regulations for non-Muslims and women.)

According to founder an-Nabhan, one of the benefits of the caliphate is that in its court system, there has never been "even one case ... settled according to other than the Islamic Shari'ah rules", although this is disputed by historians.

Unlike many court systems the caliphate would have no courts of appeal or cessation. "If the judge pronounced a sentence, it would become binding, and the sentence of another judge would not under any circumstances reverse it." (However, if circumstantial evidence changed, a judge could reverse a decision.)

==== Punishment for apostasy ====
In the HT Draft Constitution, Article 7 declares that Muslims who "have by themselves renounced Islam ... are guilty of apostasy (ridda) from Islam are to be executed". At least one HT text (How the Khilafah was Destroyed written by Abdul Qadeem Zallum, HT global leader from 1977 to 2003) emphasizes the importance of the "rule of Shariah" calling for the killing of apostates from Islam (those who have left Islam). Abdul Qadeem Zallum warns that the abolition of the caliphate in 1924 by Mustafa Kemal Atatürk was a consequence of wayward Muslims like Atatürk no longer feeling any fear that they might be killed (since according to HT ending the caliphate was an act of apostacy). To prevent this from happening again, "it is imperative to put back this issue in its rightful place and consider it to be a vital issue, by killing every apostate even if they numbered millions".

One recent case of alleged apostacy HT has commented on was the May 2014 sentence of one Meriam Ibrahima to one hundred lashes to be followed by death by hanging issued by the Sudanese Sharia court for Ibrahima's alleged fornication and renunciation of Islam. (Ibrahima had been raised Christian and married a Christian but her absent father was a Muslim so the court ruled her marriage was an act of fornication and apostacy.) (Note: Ibrahima had a Muslim father but was raised as a Christian after her father left her Christian mother. She was reportedly turned in to the authorities by one of her relatives for allegedly committing adultery after Mariam married a Christian (Daniel Wani). (While a Muslim man may marry a non-Muslim woman, the reverse is not allowed under sharia.))

After several Western governments condemned this sentence, Hizb ut-Tahrir issued a statement affirming that "the ruling of the Legislator, Allah the Almighty, for apostasy is death" and that a Muslim should not "seek the satisfaction of the hostile Kaffir West upon the descent of the Shar'i provision".

==== Criticism ====
Critics (Sardar, Kadri, Ahmed & Stuart) complain that the "particular sharia" advocated by HT would contravene the standards and values of "universal human rights", and "was formulated in the ninth century and is frozen in history. Inherently violent towards women, minorities and criminals, it has never been willingly accepted by Muslims but always had to be forcibly imposed by authoritarian regimes". (While support for sharia is strong in the Muslim world, agreement over what constitutes sharia is less so.)

=== Women ===
The HT draft constitution states "the primary role of a woman is that of a mother and wife. She is an honour ('ird) that must be protected." It declares that "Women have the same rights and obligations as men, except for those specified by the shar'i evidences to be for him or her." These limitations include not being able to hold ruling positions such as caliph, chief justice, (Note: Literally, judge of the Court of Unjust Acts.) provincial governor, or mayor; being required to cover their body (except face and hands) in public; not being able travel without a male mahram, (Note: "It is not permissible for a woman who believes in Allah and the Last Day to travel for a day and night's journey [longer than 24 hours] except with a mahram. ... A mahram is any man from the maharim of a woman (unmarriageable male kin)") disobey her husband, or marry a non-Muslim. According to HT founder an-Nabhani, "the husband performs all work undertaken outside of the house. The woman performs actions normally undertaken inside the house to the best of her ability." "Segregation" of the genders is "fundamental" in the HT constitution, and men and women should not meet together in private at all, or in public except in special shariah-approved activities such as trading or making Hajj pilgrimage.

Hizb ut-Tahrir forthrightly advocates women's (i.e. Muslim women's) suffrage or right to vote, the right of Muslim women to choose a (Muslim) partner freely, right to seek employment, serve in the military, have custody of children after divorce even if she is not Muslim, and run in elections (for positions that do not involve ruling over men).

While opponents may consider this unequal status, Hizb ut-Tahrir maintains:

Women in the Khilafah are not regarded as inferior or second class citizens. Islam gave women the right to wealth, property rights, rights over marriage and divorce as well as a place in society. Very recently Islamists established a public dress code for women – the Khimar and Jilbab which promotes women to cover themselves up as "part of the well known attire of the dress code for Muslim women" based on "widely recognised Sunni sources".

In Australia, HT generated attention in its defense of the right of a 26-year-old man to marry a 12-year-old girl in an 'Islamic ceremony' outside of Australian law (but with the girl's father's blessing), declaring that Australian law "is not a basis for moral judgments. Something being illegal according to western law does not make it immoral".

HT sources differ over whether dress for women is not a matter of choice. At HTB's 2003 annual conference, an HTB member warned the audience:

Inevitably western attitudes are beginning to affect Muslim thinking. Sometimes Muslim women will say that they wear a headscarf as a matter of choice. ... A truly Islamic woman would say she wore her headscarf in obedience to the Creator whether the Creator gave reasons or not.

However, three years later, HT Britain signed a statement in support of "a woman's right to wear the veil" as a "human and religious right". (Note: In response to the then Leader of the House of Commons Jack Straw's comments about the niqab, or face veil, a number of Muslim organizations signed a 10-point statement saying in part: "We urge people to be supportive for a woman's right to wear the veil as on one hand, this complies with the values upon which western civilization was founded – the protection of human and religious rights".)

In the organization itself, women are thought to comprise 10% of HT's membership, playing an "active role" in "intellectual and political work" such as conferences held by the UK women's section of HT, and following a dress code of jilbab (a loose dress), Khimar (headscarf) and socks, so similar it has been compared to a "uniform-like style".

=== Capitalism, democracy, freedoms, and pluralism ===
==== Capitalism ====
"Capitalism" is defined by HT as a political system of democracy and freedom (a definition many critics of HT regard as risible), not just as an economic system based on private ownership, and is frequently condemned by the party. Freedom of ownership is one of capitalism's freedoms, along with freedom of belief and opinion and "personal freedom". Capitalism is based on the idea of "the separation of religion from life", and supported by the "pillars" of democracy, "pluralism" (the recognition and affirmation of diversity and peaceful coexistence of different interests, convictions and lifestyles), "human rights and free market policies". Another facet of "Capitalism" opposed by the party is the Western concept of "compromise"—an example of its un-Islamic nature is the proposed compromise solution of allowing both Jews and Muslims to have a state in Palestine. Critics complain HT has invoked "freedom of speech, tolerance, ... human rights and democracy" when it was under threat of proscription in 2005. Like other Islamist groups, HT texts describe Islam as an alternative economic system to both capitalism and communism and superior to both.

==== Democracy ====
Hizb ut-Tahrir draws a distinction between giving authority to the people in government (which is Islamic) and giving sovereignty to the people (the essence of democracy and unIslamic). Because Western democracy gives not just authority but sovereignty to the people, it is "deeply flawed"—a "Kufr system" that violates sharia, is "controlled by large corporations and largely indifferent to the needs of ordinary citizens". Democracy may also lead to "moral laxity and sexual deviancy ... such abnormal and strange sexual practices" as homosexuality and bestality.

Since "whoever does not rule whatever Allah has revealed, denying Allah's right to legislate" is a kafir (unbeliever), self-identified Muslims who believe in democracy are actually unbelievers—including former Turkish Prime Minister Necmettin Erbakan, who will be "thrown in hell fire for his apostasy and deviation from the deen of Allah" (according to one HT pamphlet). One revivalist Muslim opponent of the HT position on boycotting elections in Western democracies, Mir Amir Ali, argued that numerous Muslim revivalist organizations had "decided that it was in the best interests of Muslims in America and Muslims worldwide to participate in politics without creating a political party", after seeking "guidance from renowned Islamic scholars from all over the world". (Note: "The American Muslim Political Coordination Council (AMPCC) composed of the American Muslim Council (AMC), the American Muslim Alliance (AMA), the Council on American Islamic Relations (CAIR), the American Muslim Political Action Committee (AMPAC), and cooperating organizations such as ISNA, ICNA, the United Muslim American Association (UMAA), and the Islamic Community of America led by Imam Warith Deen Muhammad, have considered the matters of politics in America. These organizations have sought guidance from renowned Islamic scholars from all over the world and decided that it was in the best interests of Muslims in America and Muslims worldwide to participate in politics without creating a political party.")

==== Rights or freedoms ====
Regarding other aspects of "Capitalism" condemned by HT—"Pluralism", "Human Rights", and the Freedoms of Belief, Expression, Ownership, and Personal Freedom—the 1996 HT work, The American Campaign to Suppress Islam, argues that while "many Muslims are attracted" to the slogan of "human rights ... because of the oppression, torture, and persecution they suffer from their rulers", these rights are based on the Capitalist ideology's view of the nature of man as "inherently good", when in fact man is good when he obeys God's law and bad when he does not.

Muslims who claim that the freedom of belief does not contradict Islam are among the "trumpets of the Kuffar" (unbelievers). It warns that a Muslim who calls for human rights is either a sinner (fajir) (if they do not realise the contradiction between "human rights" and Islam), or a Kafir (unbeliever) (if they believe in human rights "as an idea emanating from the detachment of deen from life"). (Muslims who "have by themselves renounced Islam ... are guilty of apostasy (ridda) from Islam are to be executed" according to Article 7 of the HT Draft Constitution.)

American-based academic David Commins writes that, "within well-recognized bounds, the Muslim enjoys much freedom" under HT's hypothetical caliphate. The HT constitution also include rights such as assumption of innocence until proven guilty, due process, and a ban on torture. Should the caliphate violate its citizens' rights, however, critics note that those citizens would have no right to rebel, because shariah law (according to HT text The Ummah's Charter) "has urged obedience to those who assume authority over the Muslims, whatever injustice they committed and however much they violated the people's rights."

==== Pluralism ====
Also opposed is pluralism, and the idea of "multiple overlapping identities" (such as someone being a 'British Muslim'), which are an example of kufr (unbelief). In all its political actions HT works to "purify" the Islamic community from "the effect of the kufr thoughts and opinions". HT has distributed pamphlets at mosques in Britain urging Muslims not to vote in elections for example (to the disapproval of other British Muslim organizations). In a pamphlet titled "An Open Letter to the Muslims in Britain regarding the Dangerous Call of Integration", it warns that Integration into Western society and secularism are a way to "keep Islam completely away from their lives such that nothing remains of it but spiritualistic rituals conducted in the places of worship and a few pages in books of history".

=== Non-Muslims and the West ===
==== Non-Muslims ====
Regarding non-Muslims living under Islam, the British HT media Information Pack describes its position as a "matter of public record", and will follow the teachings of Muslims scholars who call for Muslims to "take care of their [non-Muslim] weak, fulfil the needs of the poor, feed the hungry, provide clothes, address them politely" and even "tolerate their harm" to Muslims. It also states that non-Muslims under Muslim rule for thirteen centuries "enjoyed equal rights, prosperity, happiness, tranquillity and security".

According to Media Spokesperson for Hizb ut-Tahrir UK and member of its executive committee, Taji Mustafa,

rights of Jews and other non-Muslims are enshrined within statuary Islamic Law (Sharia). These were laid down by the Prophet Muhammad when he established the first Islamic State in Medina in the 7th century. He said, "Whoever harms a dhimmi (non-Muslim citizen who has agreed to pay the Jizya tax and submit themselves as a second-class citizen) has harmed me."

However, the Hizb ut-Tahrir draft constitution for its unified Islamic state forbids any non-Muslims living in the state to serve in any of the ruling offices, such as the position of caliph, or to vote for these officials. Muslims have "the right to participate in the election of the Khaleefah [head of state] and in giving him the pledge (ba'iah). Non-Muslims have no right in this regard." However non-Muslims may voice "complaints in respect to unjust acts performed by the rulers or the misapplication of Islam upon them".

Non-Muslims would be subject to the same laws and in addition would be subject to special taxes—the poll tax of jizya and the land tax of Kharaj. HT founder an-Nabhani explains that the taxes on Non-Muslims in the caliphate are a "right that Allah enabled the Muslims to take from the Kuffar [disbelievers] as a submission from their part to the rule of Islam."

The Jizya is taken from the Kuffar as long as they remain in Kufr [unbelief]; if they embrace Islam it will be waived from them. ... The Kharaj ... is a right imposed on the neck of the land that has been conquered from the Kuffar by way of war or by way of peaceful agreement, provided that the peace agreement stipulates that the land is ours (i.e. belonging to the Muslims) ... Each land conquered from the Kuffar after declaring war against them is considered Kharaji [land subject to Kharaj] land, and even if they embraced Islam after the conquest, the land remains Kharaji.

In regards to foreign policy, the draft constitution states that while "it is permitted to conclude good neighbouring, economic, commercial, financial, cultural and armistice treaties", "the State is forbidden to belong to any organisation that is based on something other than Islam or which applies non-Islamic rules". (It goes on to specify "the United Nations, the International Court of Justice, the International Monetary Fund and the World Bank, and regional organisations like the Arab League".)

Concerning relations with non-Muslim states following the establishment of the caliphate, one source (HT representatives talking to Forum 18 News Service) stated that "all non-Muslim states" would be given "a choice between either joining the Caliphate under Sharia law, or paying a tax", but "failure to pay the tax would be punished by military attacks".

However two other HT sources are less lenient, requiring submission to Islamic rule. One (known as Muqadimmat ul-Dustur aw asbab ul-Muwajjabbat lah or "The Introduction to the Constitution or the Causes of its Obligation") noted those in the Dar al-Harb ("House of War", i.e. outside of the HT Islamic State/Caliphate) are "considered belligerent in government (muharibeen hukman)", even if "we have a treaty with them" or there are "no actual hostilities (qital)" with them. Those who Dar al-Islam has a treaty with "are considered belligerent" (muharibeen, lit. warring people) because they "are infidels (kuffar) and they do not submit to the authority of Islam"—a position the Quilliam Foundations questions in a title "Islamism is peace or we declare war on you". Another work (The Islamic Personality, Vol. 2,) says concerning non-Muslim states, "[I]f they accepted to pay the jizyah but refused to be ruled by Islam, it is not allowed to accept this from them because the cause of fighting – which is that they are disbelievers who have refused to accept the da’wah – remains standing so fighting them remains obligatory".

In the "About Us" section of the English language section of its "Official Website" (as of 9 February 2016), HT lists "Exposing the plans and the conspiracies of the Kuffar [unbelievers]", as one of the four "actions" it "undertakes". (Note: The three other actions are: 1. Culturing people about Islam in a concentrated manner in study circles with the culture of the Party.; 2. Culturing people in a collective manner with all the possible means.; 3. Adopting the real interests of the Ummah.) Some researchers (such as David Zeidan) have noted how HT founder Nabhani emphasised (what he believed) was the hatred of the west towards Islam, where European colonialism was (he believed) simply a continuation of the Crusades:

Sheikh Nabhani considered Western animosity to Islam as a constant ever since the Crusades. [This animosity] is fueled by a wish for revenge and manifests itself in "oppression, humiliation, colonization and exploitation. ..." Modern Europe is engaged in a cultural Crusade against Islam. ... Orientalists and Christian clergy continue to support all anti-Islamic activities in the world, conspiring against Islam, slandering its history, and degrading Muhammad and his Companions.

==== The West ====
Western capitalistic states, led by the United States, are the "most vicious enemies" of Islam according to HT. Hizb ut-Tahrir sees Western influence as the cause of stagnation in the Muslim world, the reason for its failure to re-establish the caliphate thus far, and something in need of being attacked and uprooted. The Australian HT Media Pack describes Western governments as "the major obstacle to positive change in the Muslim World". Founder Nabhani has been described (by David Commins) as preaching that "British plots in particular and western imperialist conspiracies in general pervade the modern history of the Muslim world and ultimately explain its main lines of political evolution." In his book,The System of Islam, which is studied by all Hizb ut-Tahrir members, Nabhani states:

If not for the influence of the deceptive Western culture and the oppression of its agents that will soon vanish, then the return to the domain of Islam in its ideology and system would be quicker than the blink of an eye.

According to the same book, the Muslim world fell behind the West (or other non-Muslim societies) not because it failed to borrow some political, cultural, or social concepts these civilizations had to offer, but because it did:

Muslim stagnation commenced the day they abandoned this adherence to Islam and ... allowed the foreign culture to enter their lands and the Western concepts to occupy their minds.

Western intellectual and cultural influence as well as its political and economic influence must be "uprooted" from the Muslim community. According to late HT global emir Abdul Qadeem Zallum, "The fierce struggle between the Islamic thoughts and the Kufr thoughts, ... will continue ... – a bloody struggle alongside the intellectual struggle – until the Hour comes and Allah (swt) inherits the Earth and those on it. This is why Kufr is an enemy of Islam, and this is why the Kuffar will be the enemies of the Muslims as long as there is Islam and Kufr in this world".

According to the HT work Dangerous Concepts, among the tools used by Kufr nations to "finish off Islam by destroying its Aqeedah (creed) as a political Aqeedah" are such activities as "inter-faith and intercultural dialogues, and the viewpoint that both the Arab and Jewish races are the sons of Abraham."

Regarding the activity of Hizb ut-Tahrir in Western countries, HT texts emphasize the necessity of Muslims choosing between an Islamic identity and a Western one. A British HT media Information Pack states that it opposes assimilation in Western countries by Muslims but also "isolation". The party claims it "works to cultivate a Muslim community that ... adher[s] to the rules of Islam and preserv[es] a strong Islamic identity"; to "project a positive image of Islam" and "engages in dialogue with Western thinkers, policymakers and academics", but "does not work ... to change the system of government". However, HT founder An-Nabhani writing in his book The Islamic Personality, Vol. 2, stresses that the need to fight kufr extends to Muslims living outside the land of Islam (Dar al-Islam). In a land "ruled by kufr" where disbelievers "reside", the Muslim "is obliged ... to fight its people until they become Muslims or pay the jizyah and be ruled by Islam". In fact, unless he is not "able to manifest his deen [i.e. his religion] and perform the requested Shar'a rules", the Muslim is forbidden to leave Dar al-Kufr (land of unbelief) and return to Dar al-Islam, (Note: Currently there is no Dar al-Islam but will be once the new caliphate is established according to HT teachings.) as this would be "fleeing from the jihad". Critics (Ahmed & Stuart) complain that this amounts to a call for Western Muslims to "fight" their country's (non-Muslim) "people", and demonstrates "the internal contradiction" between HT's avowed "nonviolent" political ideology and its plans for subversion and violent jihad to eventually expand its proposed caliphate into non-Muslim lands.

Although in public pronouncements the party has criticised the 9/11 and 7/7 terror attacks, it has declared the "war on terrorism" to be not just overreach or arrogant disregard for Muslim lives, but a "disguise" for a "ruthless campaign against Islam and Muslims".

the real motive for waging "War Against Terrorism" is not to counter terrorism. The real motive is clearly to establish and strengthen US hegemony and influence over the Islamic lands, their people, and their resources in order to repress any semblance of Islamic political resurgence.

==== United States ====
The "head of Kufr (unbelief)" is the United States (Note: On 5 September 2006, US President George Bush stated: "This caliphate would be a totalitarian Islamic empire encompassing all current and former Muslim lands, stretching from Europe to North Africa, the Middle East and Southeast Asia") and its international domination "a danger to the world" which "only the Khilafah can save" it from, according to HT statements.

Attacks on Muslims, whether they be arrest and torture in Uzbekistan, executions in China, or attacks by Hindu mobs in India, are actually "orchestrated and sanctioned by the head of Kufr, America". Although it has its "agents" in power throughout the Muslim world, the US is using capitalism (i.e. "Democracy, pluralism, human rights and free market policies"), to suppress Islam", as it fears the revival of Islam and "the return" of "the Khilafah State", which will "destroy" US influence and interests not only over the Muslim world but "over the whole globe".

A religious leader of HT, Imam Ismat Al-Hammouri, called for the destruction of the United States, France, Britain, and Rome, in a 2013 sermon.

One observer (Zeyno Baran) has argued that statements by US President George W. Bush (the war on terrorism is a "crusade", "you are either with us or against us")) and at least one US military leader (U.S. Army Lt. General Jerry Boykin: "I knew my God is bigger than [Osama bin Laden's"]), and actions such as killings of civilians in the War in Iraq, have alarmed many Muslims and played into the HT message.

=== Zionism ===
Hizb ut-Tahrir strongly opposes Zionism and the existence of the state of Israel, or any compromise or peaceful relations with that state. According to scholar David Commins, the "liberation of Palestine" from Israel was the original "primary concern" of Hizb ut-Tahrir, with the project of setting up a unitary "Islamic state that would revive the 'true' Islamic order throughout the Muslim world coming later." According to scholar Suha Taji-Farouki, "while in theory the issue of Israel and the Jews remains peripheral to [HT's] main efforts, the party has consistently addressed it throughout its career".

In the 1990s, Ata Abu Rashta (HT's current global leader and former spokesman) proclaimed that "peaceful relations with the Jews" or settling "for only part of Palestine" (such as the post-1967 territory of the West Bank and Gaza) is "prohibited by Islamic Law". "None of the Jews in Palestine who arrived after the destruction of the Ottoman Empire have the right to remain there. The Islamic legal rule requires that those of whom are capable of fighting be killed until none survive". Later statements by HT spokespersons also emphasize the importance of Islamic control of every part of Palestine (Taji Mustafa in 2008) and rejecting negotiation in favor of military Jihad (Imran Wahid, January 2009)

Another source describes HT as supporting the "destruction of Israel", but seeing this as the job of the Caliphate, which must be founded first for this to take place.

Hizb ut-Tahrir has used the term "one-state solution" for the Israel/Palestine dispute ("Palestine – why only a one state solution will work"). This refers not to a binational solution (usually thought of in that context), where the "one state" is a united Palestinian state with no official/state religion and equal rights for all religions, but rather to the proposed HT Islamic state/caliphate which would include Palestine and where everyone, Muslims and non-Muslims alike, would follow statutory shariah Islamic law.

==== Charges of anti-semitism ====
Charges of antisemitism against HT include the 1994 call by a British MP for it to be prosecuted for anti-semitism (among other charges); the guilty verdict of the HT spokesman in Denmark for distributing "racist propaganda" (which included a quote from the Quran: "And kill them wherever you find them, and turn them out from where they have turned you out", followed by a passage stating: "the Jews are a people of slander ... a treacherous people"); its banning from public activity in Germany in 2003 by a German Interior Minister Otto Schily for what he called spreading violence and hate and calling for the killing of Jews; and a "no platform" order against the group by the British National Union of Students in 2004 for (what the NUS called) spreading antisemitic propaganda.

HT in return states that it rejects "decisively" the charge of anti-Semitism which, it says, arises from HT's anti-Zionism, (Note: "politicians and media in the west, ... frequently throwing accusations of anti-Semitism against anti-Zionists". In its Australian media pack, HT included a 2007 reply to UK Prime Minister David Cameron in which Hizb ut-Tahrir denied any anti-semitism, stating Hizb ut-Tahrir was "utterly and unashamedly opposed to Israel, is similarly utterly and unashamedly opposed to racism, tribalism, nationalism and any other form of race-based discrimination or hatred.") and it rejects it "decisively". HT says the claim is "ludicrous" since "there is a blood relation between Jews and Arabs".

Accusers cite a number of HT statements about the innate (negative) characteristics of Jews and the need and duty of Muslims to eradicate them. In a 2000 article entitled "The Muslim Ummah will never submit to the Jews", Hizb ut-Tahrir lamented what it saw as the innate behavior of Jews:

In origin, no one likes the Jews except the Jews. Even they themselves rarely like each other. ... The American people do not like the Jews nor do the Europeans, because the Jews by their very nature do not like anyone else. Rather they look at other people as wild animals that have to be tamed to serve them. So, how can we imagine it being possible for any Arab or Muslim to like the Jews whose character is such? ... Know that the Jews and their usurping state in Palestine will, by the Help and Mercy of Allah, be destroyed "until the stones and trees will say: O Muslim, O Slave of Allah. Here is a Jew behind me, so come and kill him."

(This or part of this statement was also found on a 2001 statement later removed from the Hizb ut-Tahrir website.)

A 2001 leaflet posted on HT website Khilafa.com and since removed condemns Arab and Muslim rulers for "obstructing" Muslims from their "obligation" of "eradication of the Jews".

O Muslims: Your brothers in Palestine are calling you, and you feel the pain to help them. But the treacherous rulers stand in the way of your help. They obstruct you from undertaking the obligation Allah has obliged upon you, the Jihaad and the eradication of the Jews.

Party members have been accused of publicly denying the Holocaust, calling it a "tool used by Jews to justify their own hegemony over Muslims in Palestine". In a 2003 interview with Forum 18 News Service, an Uzbekistani HT member "expressed his regret that Hitler had not succeeded in eliminating all Jews". At the Hizb ut-Tahrir August 2007 annual conference in Jakarta, Indonesia, global head of Hizb ut-Tahrir, Ata Abu-Rishta is reported to have "whipped the 100,000-strong crowd ... into a frenzy by calling for a war on Jews".

According to HT critics, labelling Muslims who "do not adhere" to HT positions "Jews" is "not uncommon" in HT. Self-identified Muslims alleged to be Jews by the party include Mustafa Kemal Atatürk, the founder of the modern Turkish state who disbanded the Ottoman caliphate, and Islam Karimov, the authoritarian ruler of Uzbekistan who has reportedly detained HT members without charge or trial for lengthy periods, tortured them and subjected them to unfair trials).

Prior to the British House of Commons affirming the government's designation of HT as a terrorist group in January 2024, Home Secretary James Cleverly said in a published statement that the group was an "antisemitic organisation that actively promotes and encourages terrorism", citing instances of the group "praising and celebrating the appalling 7 October attacks".

=== Violence ===
Hizb ut-Tahrir has been described as a "radical" or "revolutionary" but "non-violent". (Note: "it claims to be non-violent"; "The main objective of the party is a non-violent overthrow of the currently ruling governments";)

The party shares "the same political objectives" as radical Islamist groups like al-Qaeda (according to Zeyno Baran), and agrees with such groups that non-Muslims are waging war on Islam and Muslims, that leaders of Muslim countries are apostates from Islam (Note: "Ideological affinities between HT and al-Qaeda are demonstrated in the fact that both view current rulers as apostates because the Islamist project is not implemented in its totality, and Islam as an all-encompassing socio-political system that has been in absence since the Ottoman state's demise." For example, a 1996 HT leaflet describes Najmuddine Arbakan, then president of the Islamic Welfare (Rafah) party – an Islamist party – who was appointed as Prime Minister of Turkey, as being an apostate. In 2009, this leaflet was available on HT Pakistan's website.) (Note: "From al-Qaeda Training Manual: 'After the fall of our orthodox caliphates on 3 March 1924 and after expelling the colonialists, our Islamic nation was afflicted with apostate rulers who took over in the Moslem nation. These rulers turned out to be more infidel and criminal than the colonialists themselves.'") who serve as agents of Western or other non-Muslim powers, and must be overthrown.

Hazel Blears, then UK Secretary of State for Communities and Local Government, stated in February 2009 that HT "falls short of openly advocating violence or terrorism".

In public statements for the British media, the party states that it "has no history of violence or militancy anywhere in the world"; that proof of their commitment is the number of members who "have been imprisoned, tortured and even killed for their beliefs", but resisted resorting to violence; and that the party helps channel Muslim "anger and frustration over events in the Muslim world towards positive political work".

On the other hand, opponents of the party have suggested that its opposition to violence is conditional, "superficial", and far from complete. Critics argue:

- that Hizb ut-Tahrir teaches that using violence against (what it declares) enemies of Islam is righteous and justified, but must follow a declaration of jihad by legitimate Islamic authority (such as the caliphate);
- that it has urged and supported the use of violence against some non-Muslims in some circumstances (against Israel, against the US in Afghanistan, Iraq, against Hindus in Kashmir);
- and/or that its positions justifying violence have led to violence and terrorism by young Muslims impatient for the return of the caliphate.

According to two scholars (Emmanuel Karagiannis and Clark McCauley), HT's position on violence can be describe as either being "committed to non-violence for fifty years", or "waiting fifty years for the right moment to begin violent struggle".

Critics skeptical of HT's nonviolence claims include Sadakat Kadri, ex-party member Hadiya Masieh, the British National Union of Students, and Zeyno Baran. (Note: "Violence has been repudiated by the HT, but other groups working towards the same goal that do use violence are never condemned by HT. The group never denounces terrorist attacks.") (Note: HT uses "the rhetoric of democracy and a message of non-violence to mask" objectives that "can only be achieved through violence". Its ideology "encourages its followers to commit terrorist acts".)

==== Scriptural/Doctrinal basis of non-violence ====
The British website of Hizb ut-Tahrir states that the party uses the methods "employed by the Prophet Muhammad [who] limited his struggle for the establishment of the Islamic State to intellectual and political work. He established this Islamic state without resorting to violence."

Political scientist Emmanuel Karagiannis notes that after the establishment of an Islamic state in Medina, violence was resorted to. Jihad can lawfully be declared and violence and military force used (according to the party) once a true Islamic state is established. Karagiannis quotes HT: "when the Messenger of Allah waged wars, they were not fought by individual ... rather they were fought by individuals who belonged to a state. Therefore, the army was an army that belonged to a state."

Researchers Houriya Ahmed and Hannah Stuart quote another HT critic (and former member of HTB's national executive committee Maajid Nawaz), as saying that HT differs from some other Islamist jihadist groups in that rather than creating its own army for jihad, HT plans to "use pre-existing militaries". An August 2008 HT conference in London ended its presentation with the statistic that the Islamic world has, "4.7 million armed personnel – more than the USA, Europe and India combined." (Note: Examples being HT organized protest "Thousands protest in London, calling on armies to defend Gaza") (Some (Zeyno Baran) have expressed skepticism of the HT doctrine that Muslim governments would be overthrown non-violently to create a new caliphate, given government officials' natural desire to stay in power and out of prison (or a firing squad), and the force of arms at their disposal to fight coup attempts. In the late 1960s and early 1970s, several unsuccessful military coups by pro-HT factions were attempted in countries in the Middle East, and at least one (at the Military Technical College in Egypt) involved fatalities.)

Seven days after the September 11, 2001 attacks, Hizb ut-Tahrir issued a statement that "the rules" of the Islamic prophet Muhammad "message forbids any aggression against civilian non-combatants. They forbid killing of children, the elderly and non-combatant women even in the battlefield. They forbid the hijacking of civilian aeroplanes carrying innocent civilians and forbid the destruction of homes and offices that contain innocent civilians."

But a 1988 HT pamphlet stated that "if the plane belongs to a country at war with the Muslims, like Israel, it is allowed to hijack it", and a June 2001 article in an online Arabic-language journal of the party argued in some detail that suicide bombings are justified in Islamic law—at least against Israelis – "as long as the enemy unbeliever is killed". (HT sources have disagreed over whether the fight against non-Muslims perceived as attackers/occupiers in Muslim majority lands should wait for a caliphate, or is "defensive jihad" and so need not. )

There are also instances of the party calling for violence against specific targets: Karagiannis quotes an HT pamphlet as saying "the martyrdom operations that are taking place against [the Jews] are legitimate. The whole of Palestine is a battlefield whether it is the parts usurped by the Jews in 1948, or afterwards." (Note: "[While HT believes that offensive jihad is reserved for a Caliphate,] It is important to note, however, that the group recognizes that 'Islam permits Muslims to resist the occupation of their land', a reference to the resistance movements in Afghanistan and Iraq. In other words, Hizb ut-Tahrir differentiates between jihad sanctioned by the Caliph and resistance against foreign invaders.")

In an August 2006 speech Ata Abu-Rishta, the global leader of Hizb ut-Tahrir, called for the "destruction" of Hindus living in Kashmir, Russians in Chechnya and Jews in Israel. (Note: Show on BBC Panorama programme)

In the wake of the 9/11 attacks when the US invaded Afghanistan to overthrow the Taliban, HT issued a communique calling on the armies in the "Islamic Ummah" to wage war against the US and UK in retaliation for its "waging war on Afghanistan". A 2008 HT press release called the reluctance of Pakistan Prime Minister Yousaf Raza Gilani to "fight a war with America" "shameful", citing Pakistan's possession of "nuclear weapons, missiles technology and half a million brave soldiers who are ready to attain martyrdom for Islam".

Hizb ut-Tahrir states that it "has been on the public record on several occasions stating that in our Islamic opinion the killing of innocent civilians such as in the London bombings of 7th July 2005 and the attacks of September 11th 2001 are forbidden and prohibited." The British branch of Hizb ut-Tahrir was among the many Muslim groups in Britain that condemned the 7 July 2005 London bombings.

Its spokesman did not initially condemn the attacks however, and the Terrorism Research Centre complained that the initial response to the London 7/7 bombings was "to urge British Muslims to be strong in the face of an anticipated backlash" and to attack G-8 world leaders for taking advantage of the London attacks "to justify their 'war on terror'". Later statements asserted that "American tyranny and arrogance has reached a level that led many to believe that the only way to dent her pride is to rub her nose in the sand", and that the "U.S. and Great Britain declare war against Islam and Muslims".

==== Justifying terrorism and the "conveyor belt" ====
The possibility of re-establishing an Islamic superstate notwithstanding, critic James Brandon has called the "real significance" of the party "likely" to be its increasingly important role in "radicalizing and Islamizing" the Middle East, such as spreading ideas such as that the conflict between Western democracies and Islamists is an irresolvable and "inevitable clash of civilizations, cultures and religions". Other critics warn that (they believe) the party is and/or will provide "justification for the instigation of terrorism" (Ahmed & Stuart); "paving the way for other, more militant groups to take advantage of the opening it has made" (Zeyno Baran); spreading radical Islamist ideas to "millions of Muslims" through "cyberspace, the distribution of leaflets, and secret teaching centres" (Ariel Cohen); and in each country's native language (Zeyno Baran).

Scholar Taji-Farouki writes that according to HT teachings Jews and Christians are disbelievers who have formed a "united front against Muslims, and are engaged in a permanent effort to destroy Islam". Critics Ahmed and Stuart quote HT as describing the bombing of the Taliban by the US and UK as "a brutal war against ... the defenceless Muslims", and the placing of the groups "like" Islamic Jihad, Hamas, al-Gama'a al-Islamiyya in Egypt (whose acts of resistance have killed numerous civilians)) "on the list of terrorist organisations". as an example of the anti-Muslim wrongdoing by Westerners.

Others describe HT as "entry level" Islamism, or the first part of a "conveyor belt" (Zeyno Baran) for young Muslims that initiates a process leading to "graduation" (Shiv Malik) to violence. Zeyno Baran argues that Hizb ut-Tahrir safeguards its mission as "an ideological and political training ground for Islamists" by avoiding violence, and acting within "the legal system of the countries in which it operates". Other organizations handle the planning and execution of terrorist attacks.

Baran argues that as members become "impatience with the lack of success HT has had so far in overthrowing governments", they leave the party to create/join "splinter groups" less wedded to the idea that attacks on "enemies of Islam" must wait for a caliph. Baran lists four groups involving former HT members, (Note: Palestinian Islamic Jihad, Akramiye, Hizb un-Nusrat (both of Uzbekistan) and Al-Muhajiroun (UK).) the most noted being Omar Bakri Muhammad's group Al-Muhajiroun. Bakri, Muhajiroun and/or its front groups desire to turn the UK into an Islamist state, have praised the 9/11 hijackers as "magnificent", and bin Laden as "a hero who stands for divine justice and freedom from oppression", claim to have recruited many young British Muslims for "military service" jihad in Afghanistan.

HT "reject(s) the charge" of "incit[ing] others to commit violent acts", maintaining that there are "many academics that reject the allegation". (Note: The one study it cites – "Hizb ut-Tahrir – The Next Al-Qaida, Really?" – mentions neither the term "radicalization" nor the phrase "conveyor belt".) HT points out that the British government, in a classified report, discounted the conveyor belt theory, stating "We do not believe that it is accurate to regard radicalisation in this country as a linear 'conveyor belt' moving from grievance, through radicalisation, to violence ... This thesis seems to both misread the radicalisation process and to give undue weight to ideological factors." (In reply conservative columnist Andrew Giligan writes: "In fact, at least 19 terrorists convicted in Britain have had links with al-Muhajiroun, including Omar Khayam, sentenced to life imprisonment as leader of the 'fertiliser bomb' plot, and Abdullah Ahmed Ali, the ringleader of the airliner 'liquid bomb' plot, who is also serving life.")

According to Michael Whine, a "partial list" of terrorists or accused terrorists "who were also HT members and/or influenced by its teachings" includes:

- In Britain: Faisal Moustafa, Shafihur Rehman and Iftikar Sattar, who in 1995 were arrested and charged with conspiring to assassinate the Israeli ambassador, were reported to have been in possession of HT literature and to have helped organize HT meetings in Manchester. Omar Khan Sharif and Asif Hanif, the Mike's Place suicide bombers, had contact with HT before moving on to more extreme organizations. Mohammad Babar, who is linked to the seven men currently on trial in London on charges of planning terrorist attacks between January 2003 and April 2004, has stated that he was a member of HT while in college. Imam Ramee, an American, spoke on behalf of HT while living in Manchester, and was the featured speaker at the HT-organized Muslim Unity Action March against the war in Iraq on 15 March 2003. He was reportedly an associate of Abu Hamza al-Masri, and is said to have preached to "shoe bomber" Richard Reid, along with Hanif and Sharif, at the North London Mosque in Finsbury Park.
- In Germany, HT leader Shaker Assem lectured to the 9/11 terrorists after one of the plot leaders, Ramzi bin al-Shibh, facilitated his introduction.
- In Russia, HT leaders Alisher Musayev and Akram Dzahalolov were among 55 party members arrested in June 2003 for possession of plastic explosives, grenades, TNT, and detonators. In August 2005, 9 members were convicted of these offences and of incitement to racial hatred.Alexander Verkhovsky,
- In Syria, the assassins of Syrian cleric Muhammed Amin Yakan, who after being reported to be mediating between the government and the banned Muslim Brotherhood was gunned down in Aleppo in December 1999, were said to have been HT members.
- In Egypt, Salih Sirriya—a Palestinian HT member—led a coup attempt in April 1974 along with approximately 100 other members. Together, they stormed the Technical Military Academy in Heliopolis, where they attacked the armory. They seized weapons and planned to assassinate President Sadat, but were apprehended after an ensuing firefight that killed eleven HT members and injured many others. Sirriya was tried, convicted and executed in November 1976.
- In Denmark, HT members compiled a "hit list" of Danish Jewish community leaders, for which they were convicted and imprisoned in August 2002. In particular, HT leader Fadi Ahmad Abdel Latif was convicted of incitement to racial hatred.

Journalist Shiv Malik notes "Among al-Qaeda leaders, Abu Musab al-Zarqawi (former leader of al-Qaeda in Iraq), and Khalid Sheikh Mohammed (architect of the 9/11 attacks), were both former members of Hizb ut-Tahrir according to intelligence sources."

== Political spectrum ==
HT has been debated as whether it is considered a leftist or rightist group. Its "methodology and linguistic foundations", some "organizational principles" are said to have resulted from heavy "borrowing from socialist concepts" or to have "Marxist-Leninist undertones" (utopian ultimate goal—communism or Caliphate, dislike of liberal democracy, well-organized centralized (Note: MA: ... Would you say HT is a centralized party with a central executive directing all the Vilayas? JP: Yes we have one central leadership or Qiyada headed by the scholar and thinker ‘Ata Abu Rishtah. ...) vanguard party made up of secretive cells, high importance placed on spread of its ideas/ideology, worldwide ambitions for revolutionary transformation of the social/political system), or to resemble a "Socialist student movement", with many pamphlets and "fiery speeches delivered by a small cadre of speakers from within their party structure".

It is known for "borrowing expressions" of the Western political left—such as 'Sexism, like racism, is the product of the power structure' (Note: or "the inability of the capitalist system to solve social problems")—in "seek[ing] social justice" and "serv[ing] the poor" rather than foreign powers, while denouncing "capitalism" and the inequality it produces, "imperialism", governments of the economic elite ruling "on behalf of the economic elite".

On the other hand, its ideology has also been called "reactionary", "escapist fascism" and "Islamic fascism". HT texts specifically denounce the concepts of "democracy", "human rights", freedom of speech and of religion. Its constitution's provision for financial "revenue gained via occupation" (Note: the Kharaj tax, "a right imposed on the neck of the land that has been conquered from the Kuffar") and a subordinate legal status, and special taxes on non-Muslims (Note: "Jizya is a right that Allah enabled the Muslims to take from the Kuffar [disbelievers] as a submission from their part to the rule of Islam") has been attacked as revealing a "colonialist mindset", by critics Ahmed and Stuart. Along with the belief in the supremacy—moral, legal, political—of its (religious) communal group over all others, the party's belief in revealed truth as the basis of doctrine, anti-semitism, a return to the gold standard, and restoring slavery as a category of citizenship, are also at odds with leftist tenets.

Australian writer and journalist Ramon Glazov describes HT's marketing of its ideology (though not its substance) as "similar to pushing libertarianism as a 'neither Right nor Left' cure-all ideology."

== Activity by region ==
Nations which ban Hizb ut-Tahrir as of 2024

The Heritage Foundation in the U.S. reports that the organization is active in 40 countries, with 5,000 to 10,000 "hardcore" members and tens of thousands of followers. Shiv Malik in the New Statesman magazine estimates Hizb ut-Tahrir has about one million members. It is proscribed in Russia, Kazakhstan, Turkey, Pakistan, Tajikistan, Uzbekistan, the United Kingdom, and in all but 3 Arab countries.

It had previously survived a proposed ban in Australia and the UK after clearance from the intelligence services and police; the group is proscribed in the UK as of 2024 and in Australia as of 2026.

Hizb ut-Tahrir is a difficult issue for Western and Muslim governments because it aims to restore the Caliphate but rejects the use of violence to bring about political change.

=== North Africa and Western Asia ===
Hizb ut-Tahrir is proscribed in most Arab countries, but as of 2006 was permitted to operate in the United Arab Emirates, Lebanon and Yemen.

In 2006, there were a spate of Hizb ut-Tahrir campaigns and related arrests throughout the Arab world, demonstrating a growth in its popularity. There were arrests in Jordan, Morocco, Tunisia, and visible public activities in the Palestinian territories, Zanzibar, and Lebanon, enjoying growing support among senior army staff, government officials, and the intelligentsia.

==== Azerbaijan ====
Hizb ut-Tahrir is thought to have several hundred members in Azerbaijan as of 2002. Dozens of its members have been arrested.

==== Egypt ====
HT expanded to Egypt in the mid-1950s, but according to Jamestown Foundation it has not shown "significant traction" since Egyptians are "reluctant to see their distinctive historical, ethnic and cultural identities submerged within a caliphate".

It was banned after its alleged involvement in Saleh Sirriyah's precoup attack in 1974 on Egypt's Military Technical Academy. The attack was to be followed by the overthrow of Anwar el-Sadat's regime to help HT establish its state. Sirriyah believed that sudden political revolt was necessary for HT to establish its state, differing with the party's strategy of engendering popular support and seeking nussrah. (Note: Sirriyah and al-Tamimi were not the only HT members to have moved on to terrorist movements. Abu Musab al-Zarqawi, the former leader of al-Qaeda in Iraq, was also a former member of HT in Jordan. This has been verified by both The Nixon Center and Quilliam Foundation.)

The assassins, who were taught and radicalised by Salim al-Rahhal, a member of HT, believed that they were seeking nussrah for HT to assume power. The assassins were later responsible for the murder of el-Sadat in 1981. In 1983, the government arrested and charged 60 HT members with 'working to overthrow the regime with the aim of establishing the Caliphate.' In 2002, 26 men including three British nationals were arrested and convicted in 2004 for being members of HT and for 'attempting to revive' the party in Egypt. (Note: Current HTB members Reza Pankhurst, Ian Nisbet and former HTB member Maajid Nawaz were jailed in Egypt 2002 and were released in 2006.) In general, however, party support in Egypt remains weak when compared to competing Islamist groups, such as the MB. (Note: A 2007 analysis says that the MB receives mass support from especially young and student activists in Egypt. A 1996 analysis states that HT's influence in Egypt has been overshadowed by the wider support the MB receives.)

According to Amnesty, four Muslim Britons and several Egyptians were tortured in Egypt for suspected affiliation with Hizb ut-Tahrir. Eventually 26 were put on trial for what observers in Egypt considered "contradictory" and "weak" charges.

==== Iraq ====
In 1969, when the son of Iraq's highest Shia Ayatollah Muhsin al-Hakim was arrested and allegedly tortured, during widespread persecution of Shia, Abd al-Aziz al-Badri, a Sunni Islamic lawyer (Alim) and local Hizb ut-Tahrir leader, criticised the regime, and was killed under torture. A Sunni member of Hizb ut-Tahrir is thus seen as the first martyr for the rights of Shia in Iraq, against the old Ba'athist regime.

Saddam Hussein repressed HT members in Iraq in 1990, but when his army invaded Kuwait in 1990, like many Islamist and grassroots Muslim groups, HT saw the annexation as an act of unifying ‘Islamic lands’ and was enthusiastic. Farid Kassim, HTB's first deputy leader and spokesperson at the time stated, "From the Islam point of view, it is correct that any border should be removed, we are described in the Koran as one nation. The borders were not put there by Muslims, but by Europeans." British HT members gathered outside London Central Mosque in Regent's Park in an attempt to persuade others to join what they termed as Saddam's jihad. Party representatives also went to the Iraqi Embassy in London to ask Saddam to announce himself as Caliph. Not withstanding this support, 11 HT members were executed in Iraq in 1990 for calling on Saddam to abandon Ba'athism and to adopt an Islamist state.

After Saddam's removal in 2003, HT announced it would be opening an Iraqi branch. One HT member in Iraq, Abu Abdullah Al-Kurdi, claimed in a 2008 interview that the party has two offices in Baghdad, which American forces allegedly bombed, killing one HT activist.

In the civil war that followed the US invasion, HT has called for Sunni, Shia, Arab and Kurdish citizens to unite. Two prominent HT members (Adel Al-Rammah and Ahmad Sadoon Al-Ubayde) were reportedly murdered there in 2006, their bodies showing signs of torture. Regarding the hanging of former president of Iraq Saddam Hussein, Ismail Yusanto, spokesman of Hizb ut-Tahrir in Indonesia, said: "The punishment should have been given to Saddam, because Saddam killed many Iraqi people and also members of Hizb ut-Tahrir there," and that President Bush and Tony Blair "deserved no better."

==== ISIS ====
While HT has been compared to ISIL and both groups share the goal of re-establishing a caliphate that unites the Muslim world, the groups have acted as competitors rather than allies. In late 2014, HT reported that a "senior member" of its group had been executed by ISIL in Aleppo for "questioning Baghdadi's self-proclaimed Caliphate". William Scates Frances argues that the groups are "embroiled in a bitter and ongoing feud" and are quite different in organizational structure, and—at least in Australia—in their supporters culture and demographics.

==== Jordan ====
At the time of HT's founding in the West Bank that area was under the control of the Kingdom of Jordan, and one HT member (Ahmad Ad-Da’ur) won a seat in Jordan's parliament. However, as the party considered the Kingdom (like all non-caliphate states) illegitimate, called supporters to not recognize the constitution or state laws. Unsuccessful attempts to overthrow the government (sometimes planning to assassinate the king) using military elements in 1968, 1969, 1977 and 1993, have led to arrests, and prosecution and imprisonment of those found guilty of affiliation with the party.

As of 2014, Sheik Ahmad Abu Quddum was a spokesman for the Jordanian Tahrir party and called for the establishment of a worldwide caliphate and destruction of all Jews.

==== Lebanon ====
After fifty years of covert activity in Lebanon, the Lebanese government approved the registration of HT as a political party. (This may have happened because the government wanted to offset other influences such as those of Syria and Hezbollah, both of which are opposed by HT's leadership. HT called a press conference on 19 May 2006, where its local spokesman, Dr Ayman al-Kadree, stated that HT would be transformed into a political party, after the Lebanese government arrested some of its members on terrorism-related charges. The head of the HT media office stated that "the party will concentrate on an ideological and political call (da’wah) using argument and persuasion and conducting lectures, philosophical and political conferences, campaigns, forming and sending political delegations, etc."

==== Libya ====
Under the regime of Colonel Muammar al-Gaddafi, thirteen HT members were murdered according to the organization. Mohammed M. Ramadan, a Libyan journalist and announcer at the BBC's Arabic section in London, was a member of Hizb ut-Tahrir and opposed to the regime of Colonel Muammar al-Gaddafi. He was assassinated on 11 April 1980 by Libyan operatives outside London's Regent's Park Mosque. Several other members were killed in extrajudicial detention in Libya during the 1980s. Hizb ut-Tahrir described its organization along with the Muslim Brotherhood as the "important organizations causing anxiety" for the Libyan regime with Hizb ut-Tahrir endorsing "armed resistance" and successfully recruiting "students from the universities and military academies."

==== Palestine ====
Most of the founding members of HT were Palestinians, the three leaders it has had since found have been Palestinians, and Palestinians have "dominated the Hizb ut-Tahrir's leadership".

According to a 2007 report by Globe and Mail reporter Mark MacKinnon, Hizb ut-Tahrir has been "capitalizing on public unhappiness with the recent bloodshed between the mainstream Hamas and Fatah movements that has split the Palestinian cause in two. A recent rally in the West Bank drew a crowd estimated in the tens of thousands." He quotes Hizb ut-Tahrir Sheik Abu Abdullah as preaching to Muslims

Why are we watching infidels prosper in this world and not stopping them? ... Muslims in China, Indonesia, Pakistan and everywhere in their thousands are asking for God's government through the Caliphate. They demand the return of God's rule on Earth.

According to HT, in July 2009, hundreds of its activists were arrested and authorities stopped the HT 2009 annual conference from being held. In September 2009, HT along with al-Jama’a al-Islamiyya (the Lebanese branch of the MB), Hizbollah and Hamas, met in Lebanon to oppose US President Barack Obama's Arab-Israeli peace plan. The leaders issued a statement concluding that the plan ‘poses one of the most dangerous American plans in the region.’ They also said that the plan: ‘… needs to be opposed in all possible forms, in particular by increasing acts of resistance […] and opposing Israeli efforts towards a normalisation of their relations with Arab countries….’ The leaders further added that the "monopolisation" of Palestinian leadership by President Abbas must be challenged, and the choice of resistance against US plans should be encouraged. The Islamist groups agreed to keep in touch to discuss further issues of mutual interest.

==== Syria ====
Prior to the civil war, in Syria, party members, along with their relatives and acquaintances, were subject to repeated extrajudicial arrest. Representatives of HT claimed that 1,200 of its members were arrested by Syrian security forces in December 1999 and January 2000, according to the December 2000 issue of Middle East Intelligence Bulletin. Members of HT were among the political activists arrested in Syria in 2005 and tried before military courts, according to a 2006 report by Amnesty International. Since the civil war started in 2011, HT reports that it is engaged in dawah in Syria as of 2013, and Syrian Democratic Forces reported finding Hizb ut-Tahrir flags and writings after taking Tell Rifaat from Ahrar al Sham in February 2016.

==== Tunisia ====
HT was established in Tunisia in the 1970s. In 1983, 30 men, including the head of the Tunisian HT branch, were arrested, charged with membership of an illegal organization and attempting to overthrow the government in order to replace it with a Caliphate. Of the 30 arrested, 19 were military personnel, and the remaining 11 were said to have incited army officers to join the party. A May 2008 press statement issued by HT's media office in North Africa reports that 20 activists were imprisoned in that month on charges of ‘participating in reestablishing an "illegitimate" organization (Hizb ut-Tahrir), holding unauthorised meetings, preparing a place for holding un-authorised meetings and in possession of leaflets deemed as disturbing public order.’

Following the Tunisian Revolution and the fall of the Zine El Abidine Ben Ali regime, HT has been called the "main hard-line Islamist group to emerge". It organized a female conference in Tunisia in March 2012.

==== Turkey ====
The Hizb ut-Tahrir is outlawed in Turkey. However, it is still in operation as a clandestine organization. As early as 1967, leaders of HT Turkey were arrested, and have been frequently since then. According to Today's Zaman, lieutenant Mehmet Ali Çelebi, detained in the Ergenekon investigations in 2008, allegedly had links with Hizb ut-Tahrir. Çelebi was allegedly the key that made possible the arrest of five Hizb ut-Tahrir members in September 2008. Despite the charges, Çelebi was found innocent. Although his cell phone was claimed to have sent signals for one minute and 22 seconds to the Fatih base station, police officials admitted that they had entered the group's phone numbers in Çelebi's phone by accident during the investigation.

On 24 July 2009, Turkish police arrested almost 200 people suspected of being members of Hizb ut-Tahrir.

=== Central Asia ===
In Central Asia, the party has expanded since the breakup of the Soviet Union in the early 1990s from a small group to "one of the most powerful organizations" operating in Central Asia. The region itself has been called "the primary battleground" for the party. Uzbekistan is "the hub" of Hizb ut-Tahrir's activities in Central Asia, while its "headquarters" is now reportedly in Kyrgyzstan. Estimates of the party's size in Central Asia range from 15,000 to 100,000.

Hizb ut-Tahrir is banned throughout Central Asia. Central Asian governments have been accused of torturing Hizb ut-Tahrir members and violating international law in their campaigns against the group.

The party's "primary focus" in Central Asia is "socioeconomic and human rights issues", calling for "justice" against "corrupt and repressive state structures". From there it seeks to "guide" Central Asians towards support for the re-establishment of a Caliphate. It recruits from unemployed, pensioners, students and single mothers; "representatives of local power structures", who can protect party cells from surveillance and prosecution; and "law enforcement personnel" who can "facilitate access to sensitive information".

Among the factors attributed to HT's success in the region are the religious and political "vacuum" of post-Soviet society there; the party's strong organization, use of local languages; the answers it provides to problems of poverty, unemployment, corruption, drug addiction, prostitution and lack of education; its call for unification of the Central Asian states. Hizb ut-Tahrir was first started in Central Asia in Ferghana Valley in Uzbekistan.

In addition to the five ex-Soviet states of Kazakhstan, Kyrgyzstan, Uzbekistan, Turkmenistan and Tajikistan, the adjacent republic of Afghanistan, which was never part of the Soviet Union, and Chinese province of Xinjiang, are (or at least traditionally were in the case of Xinjiang) Muslim majority areas of Central Asia.

==== Afghanistan ====
HT supports the Taliban against what it calls "the two enemies of Islam and the Muslims, America and Britain, waged an unjust war against the poor and defenceless Afghan people (...)".

==== Kazakhstan ====
HT was banned there in 2005 and has many fewer members in Kazakhstan than in neighboring countries—no more than 300 as of 2004.

==== Kyrgyzstan ====
Hizb ut-Tahrir was banned in Kyrgyzstan around late 2004, but as of that time there were an estimated 3,000–5,000 HT members there.

Until sometime before 2004, the Kyrgyz government was "the most tolerant" of all Central Asian regimes towards HT—allowing leaflet distribution—and HT Central Asian headquarters was moved here from Uzbekistan. However, the party increased in "confidence and audacity" and in October 2004 was declared the "most significant extremist forces" in Kyrgyzstan.

==== Tajikistan ====
As of 2004, there were an estimated 3,000–5,000 HT members in Tajikistan.

About 60,000 people lost their lives in Tajikistan's 1992 to 1997 civil war where Islamists and liberal democrats fought against the Soviet old guard and unrest remains as of 2016. Hizb ut-Tahrir activity in Tajikistan is primarily in the north near the Fergana Valley. In 2005, the Tajik government arrested 99 members of Hizb ut-Tahrir and 58 members in 2006. In 2007, Tajik courts convicted two HT members and sentenced them to 10 1/2 and 9 3/4 years respectively. Membership in Hizb ut-Tahrir is illegal and members are subject to arrest and imprisonment.

==== Turkmenistan ====
As of 2004 HT had no "noticeable" presence in Turkmenistan in part at least because of the nomadic nature of the population, the relatively shallow Islamic roots in its culture, and the extreme repression of the government. As of 2013 the American Foreign Policy Council also reports that political Islam in general has made little noticeable headway in Turkmenistan.

==== Uzbekistan ====
Uzbekistan has been called the site of the "main ideological battle of competition over the region's future". It is the most populous former-Soviet Central Asian country, and possessor of the region's "largest and most effective army". As the "ancient spiritual and cultural center" of the Hanafi school (madhhab) of Sunni Islam, it is more religious than the other ex-Soviet countries and the area where HT first set up operation in Central Asia in "the early to mid-1990s". As of late 2004, HT had far more members in Uzbekistan than the other ex-Soviet states, with estimates ranging from 7,000 (Western intelligence) up to 60,000 (Uzbekistani government).

HT has vigorously attacked the Uzbek political system and strongman president Islam Karimov, as corrupt, shameless, hypocritical and "an insolent and evil Jew, who hates" Islam. Terrorist bombings, especially in 1999 and 2004 were blamed in part on HT by the government and have led to a brutal crackdown.

The Uzbekistan government has been criticized by human rights observers for detained HT members (among other Islamists) without charge or trial for lengthy periods, torturing and subjecting them to unfair trials, and imprisoning thousands for minor activities. However, HT has also been accused of conducting a "brilliant public relations and propaganda campaign" that has framed the fight between HT and Karimov's government as one between a "peaceful" religious group engaged in the "battle of ideas", and a government repressing religion with torture, rather than sometimes brutal attempts by an authoritarian regime to combat a radical ideology and anti-constitutional activities.

==== Xinjiang ====
As of 2008, the emergence of Hizb ut-Tahrir was a "recent phenomenon" in the Mainland Chinese autonomous region of Xinjiang. According to Nicholas Bequelin of Human Rights Watch, the party's influence was "limited" to southern Xinjiang, but "seems to be growing". One obstacle for the party in Xinjiang is that most Uyghur activists seek sovereignty for Xinjiang rather than union in a caliphate. As in other parts of Central Asia the party has been designated "terrorist" by the government and is banned.

=== South and Southeast Asia ===
==== Bangladesh ====
A national branch of the organization was established in Bangladesh in 2000 and was banned by the government in 2009 for alleged involvement in militant activities. According to Mohammad Jamil Khan, an editor at the Dhaka Tribune, despite the ban, the group reportedly maintains "members and sympathizers within the administration, various security agencies, higher educational institutions, mosques, and madrasas" and continues to be active both online and offline, including on platforms such as websites and Facebook.

As of 2008, the leader of Hizb ut-Tahrir's Bangladesh branch was believed to be Zituzzaman Hoque, a British national, whom the organization has acknowledged as a member. Hoque is reported to lecture at an independent university in Bangladesh.

On 19 January 2012, the Bangladesh Army indicated Hizb ut-Tahrir's involvement in an attempted coup in 2011 to overthrow the government. Subsequently, on 23 January 2012, the Rapid Action Battalion arrested Dr. Golam Haider Rasul, a physician at United Hospital in Dhaka, for his alleged connection to the organization.

In 2024, following the fall of the Sheikh Hasina government, reports suggest that the banned Hizb ut-Tahrir has resumed public activities. In March 2025, the Counter Terrorism and Transnational Crime (CTTC) unit arrested 3 members of Hizb ut Tahrir in Dhaka. The members were secretly planning to hold a rally called the 'March for Khilafat' in the Baitul Mukarram Mosque area.

==== Indonesia ====
Hizb ut-Tahrir used to work openly in Indonesia. Indonesia has been called the party's "strongest base", where in August 2007 tens of thousands of people demonstrated in support of the caliphate in the Gelora Bung Karno Stadium in Jakarta. They also held caliphate rallies in many cities across the country, such as in the Gelora 10 November Stadium in Surabaya in 2013.

The party was introduced in Indonesia in 1983 by Jordanian-Lebanese man named Abdurrahman al-Baghdadi. As of 2004 it was led by Muhammad Ismail Yusanto. It started as an underground campus movement and as of 2004 remained "largely campus based" with "well-attended rallies and meetings without government restrictions".

According to the International Crisis Group HT Indonesia may have ties to violent extremist groups such as Jemaah Islamiyah, the group responsible for the Bali bombing in October 2002.

On 14 January 2016, four assailants staged a bomb and firearm attack in Jakarta where eight people (including the four assailants) died. Indonesian police named a Bahrun Naim, as the principal organizer of the attack. Bahrun was Indonesian but based in Syria with "Islamic State", but before that "studied with Hizbut Tahrir" (both HT and Islamic State in favor of a new caliphate). HT Indonesia spokesman Muhammad Ismail Yusanto stated that Bahrun was expelled from Hizbut Tahrir when it was found out he was "secretly hiding a weapon".

On 8 May 2017, the Indonesia government announced plans to disband Hizb-ut Tahrir within Indonesia, as it is against Indonesia's legislative foundation of Pancasila, an ideology based on a multi-faith democracy. In July 2017, the Indonesian government officially banned and revoked the legal status of Hizb-ut Tahir.

On 25 October 2022, an attempted shooting occurred in front of the Istana Negara in Jakarta. On 26 October 2022, after the investigation and checking the databases, National Counter Terrorism Agency announced that the assailant is a Hizb-ut Tahrir Indonesia member.

==== Malaysia ====
On 17 September 2015, the Selangor (Malaysia) Fatwa Committee declared Hizb ut-Tahrir a deviant group and said followers of the pro-Caliphate movement who continue to spread their ideologies and teachings in the state will face legal action.

==== Pakistan ====
In Pakistan, HT activities were "officially launched in late 2000 and increased after 9/11". HT opened up its own publishing house in Peshawar for the benefit of Central Asian states to the northwest. Its efforts to recreate the Caliphate in Central Asia are "believed to be supported by extremist groups", according to Zeyon Baran. Hizb ut-Tahrir was proscribed and banned by Pakistani President General Musharraf in 2004. In October 2004, HT led a march of people to the Pakistani high commission in London, calling for the removal of Musharraf, declaring: "Pakistan Army: why are you silent?" Hizb ut-Tahrir branch in Pakistan does not have any links with terrorist groups.

On 17 October 2009, 35 HT members and supporters, including key leaders were arrested in Islamabad under anti-terrorism legislation. In May 2012, key members of HT including HT's spokesman, Naveed Butt, was arrested by Pakistani police on the suspicion of inciting violence in the country. On 12 December 2014, Pakistani police arrested 12 more activists of HT.

Pakistani author Ahmed Rashid writes in Jihad: The Rise of Militant Islam in Central Asia, that there are "strong links and cooperation between the rank and file" of Hizb ut-Tahrir and the Islamic Movement of Uzbekistan especially when they are from the same village or town. However, according to Jean-François Mayer of the Swiss Federal Department of Foreign Affairs, the insinuation "that the party will turn violent and has links with the IMU" is inaccurate; the comments attributed to a member "contradicted the party's ideas". Representatives of Hizb ut-Tahrir report that they have repeatedly attempted to contact Ahmed Rashid in order to make their views known, but say they have not succeeded. They are even considering writing a rebuttal of his book.

In August 2012, a Brigadier and three majors in the Pakistan Army were convicted of being members of Hizb-ut-Tahrir (a banned organisation), the first time that senior army officers in Pakistan had been convicted and jailed over associations with banned organizations. The officers had allegedly attempted to recruit officers to their group "including the commander of the army's 111 Brigade, which covers the capital and has been historically linked to army coups." Taji-Farouki describes HT as "operating openly despite" a 2003 ban. In early 2016, Dawn reported a crackdown on HT.

=== Western countries ===
In Germany and Denmark, HT's "hostility to democratic institutions and its refusal to recognise Israel's right to exist has caused legal problems" according to Jean-Pierre Filiu. In France and Spain, as of 2008, HTs cells were illegal and the authorities were keeping the party under close surveillance.

While HT's ideology and strategy are centralised, localities have different strategic action plans, so that for example when it comes to international situations, the Danish branch focuses on the Arab-Israeli issue because in Denmark the Muslim population is primarily of Arab descent while the British branches focus on Indian issues because in Britain Muslims are primarily of Indian descent.

==== Australia ====
Hizb ut-Tahrir has been involved in a number of controversies in Australia but has been "clever at knowing how to be outrageous enough to get media attention but not get arrested", according to one observer (Greg Barton). Another observer (Irfan Yusuf) claims HT and anti-immigrant politicians "feed off each other's hysteria".

HT Media representative Uthman Badar talk ‘Honour killings are morally justified’ was canceled from a June 2014 Festival of Dangerous Ideas. Man Haron Monis, the gunman who took hostages in a siege at the Lindt Chocolate Café in Sydney, was found to have talked to members of Hizb ut-Tahrir and attended several of their events. At a July 2014 speech in Sydney, Australian party leader Ismail al-Wahwah called for a jihad against the Jewish people, prompting a complaint to the NSW Anti-discrimination Board. In another Sydney sermon, circa February 2015, Ismail al-Wahwah said regarding Jews that, "There is only one solution for that cancerous tumor: It must be uprooted and thrown back to where it came". At a 19 January 2015 meeting in Sydney, HT leader Bilal Merhi called for a "Muslim army in Australia" to impose Sharia law in Australia, pointedly refusing to condemn acts of violence by the Islamic State. At a November 2015 meeting in Sydney, hundreds of Muslims were told that their children should not be forced to sing the Australian anthem and that "deradicalisation" was an agenda of forced assimilation.

In 2005, Australia's intelligence service investigated the possibility of banning HT but "concluded new legislation would be needed". In 2007, the premier of New South Wales attempted to outlaw Hizb ut-Tahrir but was blocked by Australia's attorney general.

According to the Daily Telegraph, Hizb ut-Tahrir has more than 300 members in Australia. According to journalist Alison Bevege (who after great difficulty successfully sued HT for discrimination after being told sit at the back section of the room or leave an HT meeting in 2015), HT in Australia is not a legally registered organization. Since the organization will not reveal its leadership, the "only public face" of Hizb ut-Tahrir in Australia is its "media spokesmen".

In April 2017 Hizb ut-Tahrir (Australia) produced a video in which two women discussed how to resolve marital conflicts, as prescribed in the Quran. One of the women said, "a man is permitted to hit a woman as an act of discipline" describing it as, "a beautiful blessing". This interpretation of the particular ayah was condemned by more than 30 prominent leaders of the Muslim community including Sheikh Shady Alsuleiman, President of the Australian National Imams Council.

On 6 March 2026, Hizb ut-Tahrir was listed as a prohibited hate group under the Combatting Antisemitism, Hate and Extremism (Criminal and Migration Laws) Act 2026.

==== Denmark ====
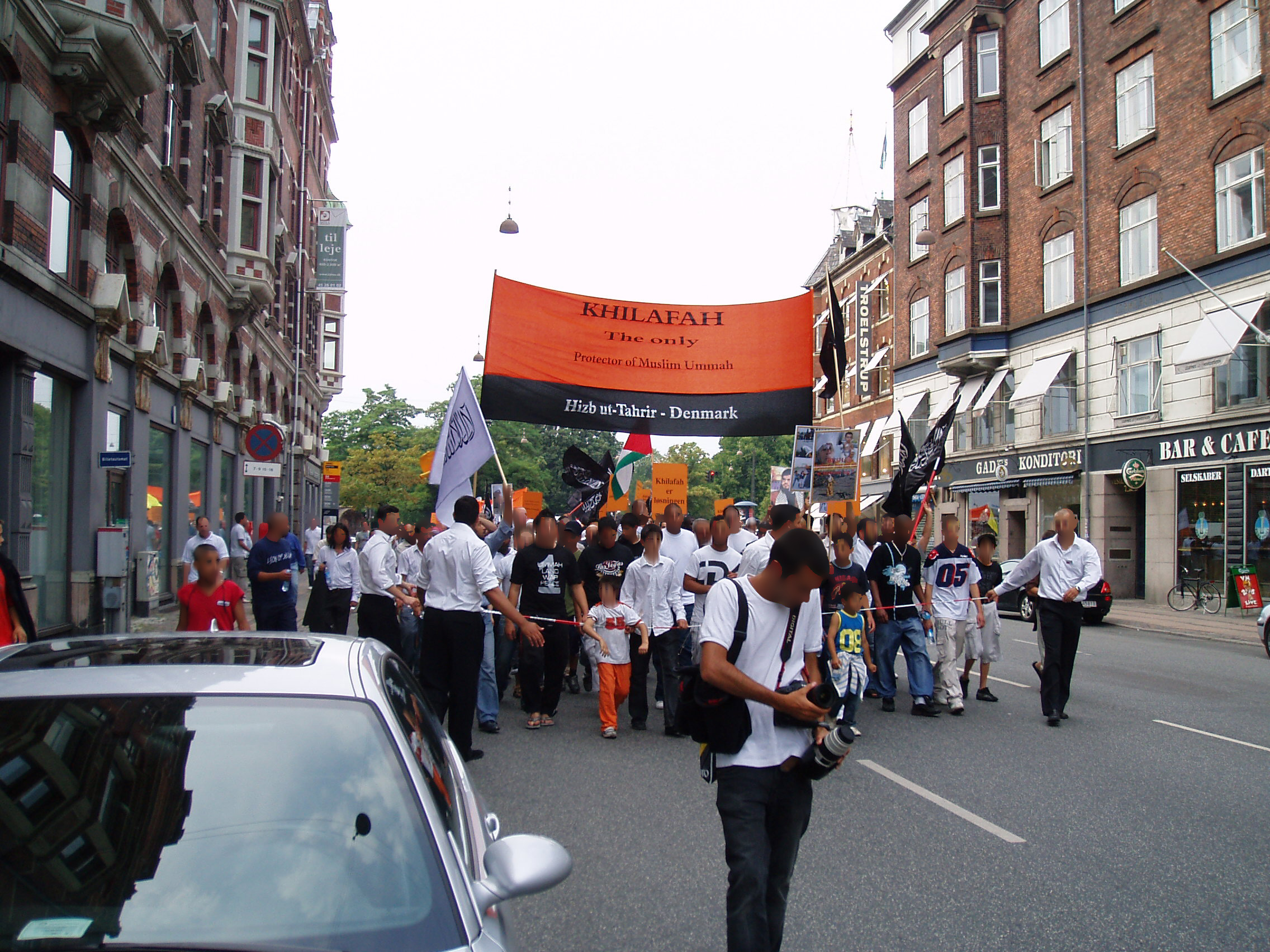
Hizb ut-Tahrir demonstrating in Copenhagen.

HT opened a branch in Denmark in 2000 with the help of British HT members. Hizb ut-Tahrir is legal in Denmark but ran into controversy in 2002, when it distributed leaflets in Copenhagen that a Danish court determined were racist propaganda. Imran Khan of the BBC program "Newsnight" described the leaflet as follows:

In March and April 2002, Hizb Ut Tahrir handed out leaflets in a square in Copenhagen, and at a mosque. The leaflet also said, 'The Jews are a people of slander... a treacherous people... they fabricate lies and twist words from their right context.' And the leaflet describes suicide bombings in Israel as "legitimate" acts of "Martyrdom".

In August 2006, Fadi Abdelatif, Hizb ut-Tahrir's spokesperson in Denmark, was given a suspended 60-day jail sentence for distributing the leaflet. Abdelatif was also found guilty of threats against the Danish Prime Minister Anders Fogh Rasmussen. The court rejected his claims that he was just quoting from the Koran, that it was an act of free speech and that it was aimed only at the Israeli state and not Jews. In 2002 HT Denmark was also accused of produced "a ‘hit list’ of 15 to twenty leading members of Denmark's Jewish community." HT has been successful in attracting disaffected youth and, according to the Copenhagen Post, petty criminal youth, including young ethnic Danes. It is "only organization that offers organized Quran instruction in Danish ..."

In 2007 Berlingske Tidende reported that a kindergarten in Copenhagen was being run in line with the ideology of Hizb ut-Tahrir. Also that year, several well known imams in Copenhagen attended a convention of Hizb ut-Tahrir and announced that they were willing to work together towards mutual goals. This move attracted criticism from a variety of Muslim and non-Muslim voices.

In 2016, Copenhagen Municipality decreed that Hizb ut-Tahrir could not rent space or hold event in any building owned by the municipality.

==== Germany ====
The first national branch in a non-Muslim majority country was established in West Germany in the 1960s.

German police expelled a member of the party from Germany for alleged ties to one of the hijackers involved with the 11 September 2001 attacks. However, German police said the raids and searches in offices and homes revealed little.

In January 2003, Hizb ut-Tahrir was barred from public activity in Germany, German Interior Minister Otto Schily stating that the group was spreading violence and hate and had called for the killing of Jews. The charges originate from a conference at Technische Universität Berlin, organized by a student society affiliated with Hizb ut-Tahrir. The group's representative in Germany Assem Shaker responded that the group was not anti-Semitic. He added, "We do not call to kill Jews. Our call is addressed to the Muslim people to defend themselves against the Zionist aggression in Palestine. And they have the right to do so."

The anti-semitism charges were not upheld in German courts, but the ban was continued based on the state's finding that the group's activity opposed the idea of understanding among nations and endorsed force as a means towards its political aims. A lawsuit against the ban was rejected on 23 January 2006 by the Federal Administrative Court in Germany. The organization appealed the ban to the European Court, stating in 2008:

"We note that the German courts did not uphold any of the German Interior Ministries accusations of anti-Semitism against HT, however, they have now relied on an obscure principle of the 'idea of international understanding' to ban all of our activities (speeches, study circles, articles, vigils, political meetings, books, magazines, and debates)."

As of 2004 HT "continues to recruit and raise funds" in Germany but "any organizational structures" there "remain hidden", and HT activists in the country behave "in a highly secretive manner", according to Zeynon Baran.

On 31 July 2006 two Lebanese men planted incendiary bombs in German commuter trains but the devices that could have killed hundreds failed to explode (see 2006 German train bombing attempts). The perpetrators belonged to a group that was affiliated with Hizb ut-Tahrir. The motive was to kill infidels as a "revenge" for cartoons of Mohammad in a Danish newspaper in 2005.

==== Netherlands ====
Hizb ut-Tahrir Indonesia spokesperson, Ismail Yusanto said to Nikolaos van Dam, the Dutch ambassador for Indonesia that the Dutch government is responsible for the Fitna of Geert Wilders and declared aslim taslam (submit to Islam).

==== Russia ====
In the late 1990, the former president of Uzbekistan Islam Karimov launched an extensive crackdown on Islamic organizations, such as HT, forcing their members to flee abroad. Russia being the top destination for the labour migrants from Uzbekistan accommodated a significant number of silent HT adepts from Uzbekistan. Their first Russian HT cells emerged in 1999 in Nizhnevartovsk, a city in the oil-rich region of Yugra. Later they appeared also in Dagestan, North Caucasus, and in Tatarstan, Volga region. The adepts held gatherings on the private premises recruiting newcomers among both local, including non-Muslim, and migrant populations, denouncing the Russian rule and praising the armed combat against the non-Islamic governments globally. According to the experts estimates, by 2013 native Muslims made up only 50% in HT in Russia, the rest are native Russians, Ukrainians and other typically non-Muslim individuals. They are mostly between the age of 18 to 30 and well-educated.

In February 2003, the Russian Supreme Court put Hizb ut-Tahrir and 14 other groups, including foreign, such as Al-Qaeda, Taliban, Muslim Brotherhood and local militant insurgents on a list of banned terrorist organizations. As per the Court's decision, the motivation in respect of HT were their "militant Islamic propaganda combined with intolerance to other religions" and "subversive activities to fracture the society" aimed at the removal of the non-Islamic regimes and establishing the global Caliphate, primarily within the regions where Muslim populations are present".

In 2005, nine people accused of links to HT, a "banned organization", were put on trial in Russia, just one of several trials on charges of association with the group around that time. Human rights groups have complained that authorities were increasingly becoming repressive and planting evidence on Muslims to justify charges. Among the arrested was the head of HT cell in Nizhnevartovsk who was found to have "kept extremist literature promoting hatred and intolerance"; earlier this person had turned, to no avail, to the local TV station for the airtime to publicly promote his views.

In 2010, three people were killed in Staroye Almetyevo, Tatarstan, reportedly in a shootout with Russian security forces. They were accused for recent bombing against a law enforcement facility. According to an Interior Ministry spokeswoman, there was "a 90 percent chance the liquidated terrorists belong to a banned Islamist organization, which could be Hizb ut-Tahrir."

Russian wing of HT held liaisons with Russian political opposition, both left and right-wing. In 2012, the Left Front leader Sergey Udaltsov called Islamic radicals to support the "March of Millions" against the rule of Vladimir Putin. During the police raid at HT premises in Chelyabinsk, Urals region, evidence was found that a female HT activist penetrated into the close circle of the liberal opposition leadership.

During early 2012–2013, HT arranged mass street actions in Dagestan, namely in Kizlyar (known for the insurgent raid of 1996) and capital Makhachkala. Both started with a prayer in local mosque that was followed by a march under the black banners, emotional speeches and burning down of the US flag. The speakers denounced both "pro-Assad" and "pro-democratic" policies pursued by Russia and the US in Syria respectively, and called for the Sharia law there. More street actions and minor fights with police followed until police blocked a march of 25 vehicles decorated with HT banners and arrested the leader of Dagestani HT cell, Magomed Kartashov.

In an article in Time magazine on 8 May 2013, investigative journalist Simon Shuster published his findings about the extensive contacts between the detained Kartashov and Tamerlan Tsarnaev, the man responsible for the Boston Marathon bombing of 2013, that took place in Dagestan as Tsarnaev visited Russia before the bombing.

In October 2015, 20 supporters of Hizb ut-Tahrir, were detained in and around Moscow, and "up to 100 others" were under investigation, according to a "source in Moscow's security services."

In October 2018, the head of Russian wing of HT was reported to have been arrested in Tatarstan for planning of the terrorist actions against the law and order.

Hizb ut-Tahrir operates in Crimea among the Crimean Tatars. Following the 2014 Russian annexation of Crimea at least 19 people were arrested on suspicion of membership. (Since the annexation, the status of Crimea is under dispute between Russia and Ukraine; Ukraine and the majority of the international community considers Crimea an integral part of Ukraine, while Russia, on the other hand, considers Crimea an integral part of Russia, with Sevastopol functioning as a federal city. Russian authorities are in control of both). According to the head of FSB, during 2018 three HT cells were deactivated in Crimea. Ruslan Balbek, member of the Russian Parliamentary Committee for Religious Matters claimed that the existing Crimean HT cells remained there "since the time of the Ukrainian rule and are financed from abroad". As Ukrainian news outlet Strana.ua reported, before 2014 Crimean HT activists were not persecuted as HT was not deemed terrorist organization in the Ukraine, but once the Russian authorities initiated a massive crackdown on the banned HT in Russia proper and in Crimea, many HT activists fled Russia for Ukraine and settled mostly in Odesa, where they are expecting a refugee status that Ukrainian authorities are very reluctant to provide. In August 2022, TASS reported that the Russian Federal Security Service has busted a Hizb ut-Tahrir clandestine terror cell in Crimea.

==== Sweden ====
In 2012, investigating magazine Expo wrote that Hizb ut-Tahrir had started to establish itself in Sweden. In October 2012 Hizb ut-Tahrir situated its annual "caliphate conference" in Stockholm. The group at the time had a section for all of Scandinavia which was primarily active in Denmark.

In the 2018 Swedish general elections, the group campaigned in the Stockholm area for Muslims not to vote.

==== United Kingdom ====
Hizb ut-Tahrir is banned in the United Kingdom, having been declared a proscribed terrorist organization in January 2024. The UK branch had been described as a "logistical nerve centre" of the organization, where its leaflets and books are produced for global distribution. According to Abdul Qadeem Zallum, the global leader from 1977 to 2003, the United Kingdom is also the land of the "arch enemies of Islam", who Muslims should "harbour hatred for" and "a yearning for revenge over".

In 2005, the UK Home Office described Hizb ut-Tahrir as a "radical, but to date non-violent Islamist group" that "holds anti-Jewish, anti-western and homophobic views". In 2007, HTB "dominate[d]" the Islamist "scene" in Britain with an estimated 8,500 members, but has declined in size and as of 2015 has been described as "less influential". As of mid-2015 Abdul Wahid was the leader of HT Britain, and the party was reportedly funded by private donations and membership revenue.

In January 2024, the British government declared its intention to seek parliamentary approval to designate Hizb ut-Tahrir a proscribed terrorist organization. On 19 January, parliament approved the draft order and the group was formally banned. Membership of, and expression of support for, Hizb ut-Tahrir is a criminal offense punishable by up to 14 years in prison. The decision came after the group organized rallies in support of the 2023 Hamas-led attack on Israel, featuring chants of "jihad". The group denies supporting Hamas and advocating violence. The group was under the threat of being proscribed twice in the past — by the UK government in the immediate aftermath of the 7/7 bombings and by the ruling Conservative Party during the 2010 General Election – and with blacklisting from airwaves and universities in another 2015 Tory plan.

==== United States ====
Hizb ut-Tahrir America, based in Chicago, was reportedly founded by Mohammed Malkawi, who is an adjunct professor at Argosy University-Chicago. The group held its first conference in the United States in 2009. However, a subsequent attempt to hold a conference in 2010 at the Chicago Marriott Oak Brook hotel was cancelled after the hotel dropped the group's reservation. In 2012, the group attempted to hold its annual conference entitled "Revolution: Liberation by Revelation – Muslims Marching Toward Victory" conference at the Meadows Club, but this was also cancelled after the club pulled out due to criticism.

Reza Iman, who is a spokesperson for the group, claimed that the group has been active in the United States for almost 30 years, and defended Hizb ut-Tahrir's activities, stating in an interview that "The call is not to bring that [an Islamic caliphate] here to this country or anything of that sort. The message is for Muslim countries to return to Islamic values." DePaul University history professor Thomas Mockaitis stated that "I have not seen any evidence they have engaged in violent activity in the U.S." and that the group's views and goals, while controversial, did not warrant its labeling as a terrorist group.

Zaher Sahloul, who is the chairman of the Council of Islamic Organizations of Greater Chicago and president of the Mosque Foundation of Bridgeview, stated that "[Hizb ut-Tahrir's is] on the fringes of the political Islamic groups. They are very vocal and they target young Muslims in college (who) are attracted to their ideologies. They tend to disrupt lectures, Friday prayers. Most of the time they are kicked out from mosques." Sahloul added that "We cannot deny people of speaking freely, but we believe that these kind of radical ideologies are not helpful."

At a conference in Jordon in June 2013, Dr. Malkawi stated (as translated by MEMRI) "Let Britain, America, and the entire West go to hell, because the Caliphate is coming, Allah willing." Regarding US President Barack Obama, Malkawi stated "Obama says to you, in Syria, Egypt, and elsewhere: 'I have chosen heresy as a religion for you.' Will you accept heresy as your religion, oh Muslims? Say: 'Allah Akbar."

== Prominent members ==
Hizb ut-Tahrir was founded and led by Taqiuddin an-Nabhani from 1953 to 1977. He was succeeded by Shaykh Abdul Qadeem Zallum who led HT until his death in 2003. He was succeeded by Ata Abu Rashta who is currently HT's leader.

- Judge Taqi al-Din al-Nabhani (founder, deceased)
- Sheikh Abdul Qadeem Zallum (Second Ameer, deceased)
- The eminent scholar Eng. Ata Abu Rashta (current Amir of the party)
- Engineer Salah Eddine Adada (Director of Central Media Office)
- Dr. Nazreen Nawaz (Director of the Women's Section of the Central Media Office)
- Ibrahim Othman (Abu Khalil) (Official Spokesman in Sudan)
- Ustadh Muhammad Jami’ (Deputy Spokesman of Hizb ut Tahrir in Sudan)
- Dr. Ismail Yusanto (Official Spokesman in Indonesia)
- Ustadh Abdul Hakim Othman (Official Spokesman in Malaysia)
- Ustadh Shahzad Sheikh (Deputy Spokesman in Pakistan)
- Ustadha Fahmida Khanoum Muni (Official Spokesperson in Bangladesh)
- Mahmoud Kar (Head of the Media Office of Hizb ut Tahrir in Turkey)
- Ahmad Abdel Wahab (Head of the Media Office of Hizb ut Tahrir in Syria)
- Dr. Muhammad Ibrahim (Head of the Media Office of Hizb ut Tahrir in Lebanon)
- Abd al-Mu’min al-Zaila’i (Head of the Media Office of Hizb ut Tahrir in Yemen)
- Muhammad Maqaideish (Head of the Media Office of Hizb ut Tahrir in Tunisia)
- Saifullah Mustaneer (Head of the Media Office of Hizb ut Tahrir in Afghanistan)
- Dr. Mus’ab Abu Arqoub (Member of the Media Office of Hizb ut Tahrir in Palestine)
- Eng. Baher Saleh (Member of the Media Office of Hizb ut Tahrir in Palestine)
- Alaa Abu Saleh (Member of the Media Office of Hizb ut Tahrir in Palestine)
- Shakir Asim (Media Representative of Hizb ut Tahrir in the German-speaking countries)
- Okay Pala (Media Representative of Hizb ut Tahrir in the Netherlands)
- Yahya Nesbit (Media Representative of Hizb ut Tahrir in Britain)
- Engineer Ismail Al-Wahwah (Media Representative of Hizb ut Tahrir in Australia)
- Wassim Doureihi (Media Representative of Hizb ut Tahrir in Australia)
- Shabani Mwalimu (Media Representative of Hizb ut Tahrir in Kenya)
- Massoud Musallem (Media Representative of Hizb ut Tahrir in Tanzania)
- Daliyar Djambev (Media Representative in Kyrgyzstan)
- Sheikh Ahmad Al-Daour (Member of the Jordanian Parliament 1955–1957, deceased)
- Sheikh Yousef Al-Sabatin (a prominent member in Jordan, deceased)
- Professor Fathi Mohammad Salim (senior member, died on Sunday 12 October 2008 in Jordan)
- Sheikh Abdul Aziz al-Badri (a prominent member in Iraq, executed)
- Farhad Osmanov (a prominent member in Uzbekistan, executed)
- Hisham ElBaradei (member of Hizb ut Tahrir, killed in Al-Khalil (Hebron) by Palestinian security forces)
- Sheikh Ali Saeed Abul Hassan (Imam of the Sahaba Mosque, Khartoum, former Sudan Spokesman, deceased)
- Sheikh Essam Amiera (Imam of the Rahman Mosque in Beit Safafa in Palestine)
- The honourable Yilmaz Cilek (a prominent member in Turkey)
- The honourable Ustadh Ahmad Al-Qasas (a prominent member in Lebanon)
- Abdullah Omar Batheeb (senior member in Yemen)
- Nasser Wahan Al-Lahbi (a prominent member in Yemen)
- Muhammad Al-Khatat (a prominent scholar in Indonesia and a member of the Council of Indonesian Scholars)
- Hafidh Abdul Rahman (a prominent member in Indonesia)

== Books ==
The book The Islamist by Ed Husain reveals the inner workings of the political organization. It follows the path of a young man coming to terms with his extremist/Islamist mindset. He describes how violence and the increasing radicalisation of the group eventually lead to him cutting all ties and resigning from the head of the local group at Tower Hamlets University. The author, now a moderate Muslim, is opposed to the ideology of Hizb ut-Tahrir and critical of the consequences of political Islam poisoning young minds.

Radical: My Journey out of Islamist Extremism is Maajid Nawaz's autobiography. It partly recounts his time as a recruiter for Hizb ut-Tahrir, his imprisonment in Egypt from 2002 to 2006, and his release after being cited as a "prisoner of conscience" by Amnesty International. In 2007, he left HT and co-founded the Quilliam Foundation with Ed Husain, an organization focused on countering extremism in the Muslim World. Radical was released in the UK in 2012; a US edition was published by Lyons Press in October 2013 with a preface for US readers and an updated epilogue.

== See also ==
- List of Islamic political parties
- List of political parties in Saudi Arabia
- Islam in Indonesia
- Islam in Uzbekistan
  - May 2005 unrest in Uzbekistan
- Islamic democracy
- List of political parties in the Palestinian National Authority
- Muslim Brotherhood
- Maajid Nawaz – former member, current founder of Quilliam Foundation
