= Lindt Cafe siege =

Terror hostage-taking in 2014 in Sydney, Australia

Lindt Café siege
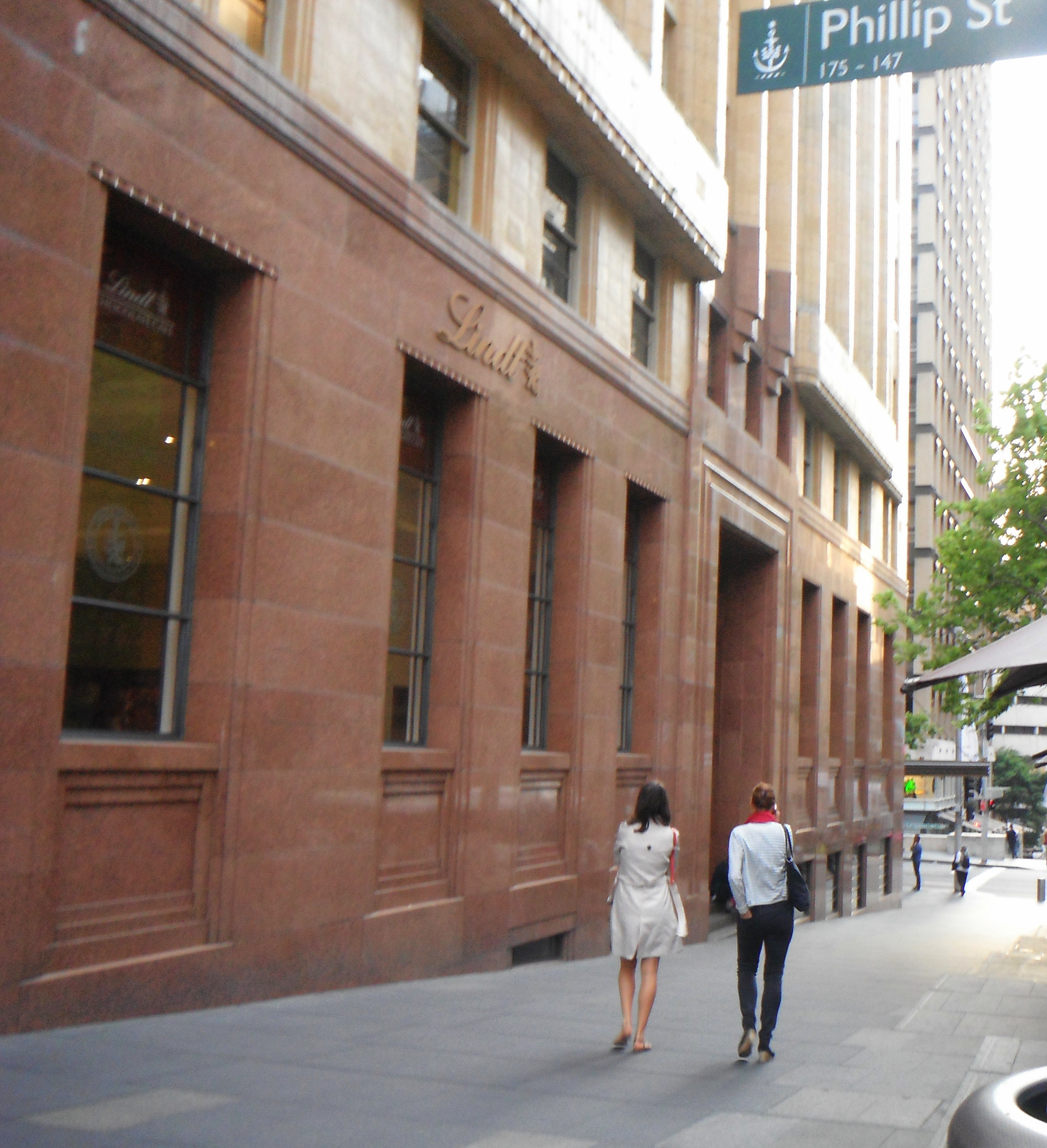
- Lindt Chocolate Cafe in Martin Place, Sydney

- Map indicating the location of the incident. Martin Place is denoted in blue, towards the centre of the map.
- Location: 33°52′04.6″S 151°12′40″E; Martin Place, Sydney, New South Wales, Australia
- Date: 15–16 December 2014; 9:44am – 2:44am (AEDT, UTC+11:00)
- Target: Cafe staff and customers
- Attack type: Terrorist attack, hostage taking
- Weapon: Sawn-off Manufrance LaSalle 12-gauge pump-action shotgun
- Deaths: 3 (1 killed by Monis, 2 killed by police including Monis)
- Injuries: 4
- Victims: 18 hostages
- Perpetrator: Man Haron Monis
- Motive: Islamic extremism
- Inquiry: Sydney siege inquest
- Coroners: Magistrate Michael Barnes, NSW State Coroner

The Lindt Café siege (also known as the Sydney siege) was a terrorist hostage-taking that occurred on 15–16 December 2014 when a lone gunman, Man Haron Monis, held ten customers and eight employees of a Lindt Chocolate Café hostage in the APA Building in Martin Place, Sydney, Australia.

The Sydney siege led to a 16-hour standoff, after which a gunshot was heard from inside and police officers from the Tactical Operations Unit (TOU) stormed the café. Hostage Tori Johnson was killed by Monis, and hostage Katrina Dawson was killed by a police bullet ricochet in the subsequent raid. Monis was also killed. Three other hostages and a police officer were injured by police gunfire during the raid.

Police have been criticised over their handling of the siege for not taking proactive action earlier, for the deaths of hostages at the end of the siege, and for the lack of negotiation during the siege. Hostage Marcia Mikhael called radio station 2GB during the siege and said, "They have not negotiated, they've done nothing. They have left us here to die."

Early on, hostages were seen holding a Jihadist flag against the window of the café, featuring the shahādah creed. Initially, many media organisations mistook it for the flag used by the Islamic State (IS); Monis later demanded that an IS flag be brought to him. Monis also unsuccessfully demanded to speak to the Prime Minister of Australia, Tony Abbott, live on radio. Monis was described by Abbott as having indicated a "political motivation," but the eventual assessment was that the gunman was "a very unusual case—a rare mix of extremism, mental health problems and plain criminality."

In the aftermath of the siege, Muslim groups issued a joint statement in which they condemned the incident, and memorial services were held in the city at the nearby St Mary's Cathedral and St James' Church. Condolence books were set up in other Lindt cafés and the community turned Martin Place into a "field of flowers." The Martin Place Lindt café was severely damaged during the police raid, closed afterwards, then renovated for reopening in March 2015.

== Events ==
=== Prior to event ===
An anonymous call was made to Australia's anti-terrorism hotline 48 hours before the siege, raising concerns about the content of Monis' website. On his website, Monis had pledged allegiance to "the caliph of the Muslims", believed to be referring to Islamic State leader Abu Bakr al-Baghdadi, and denounced moderate Islam. It has been reported that the Australian Security Intelligence Organisation followed up on the call by reviewing the website and Monis' posts on social media but found nothing to indicate that he was likely to commit an act of violence.

=== Hostage-taking and negotiations ===
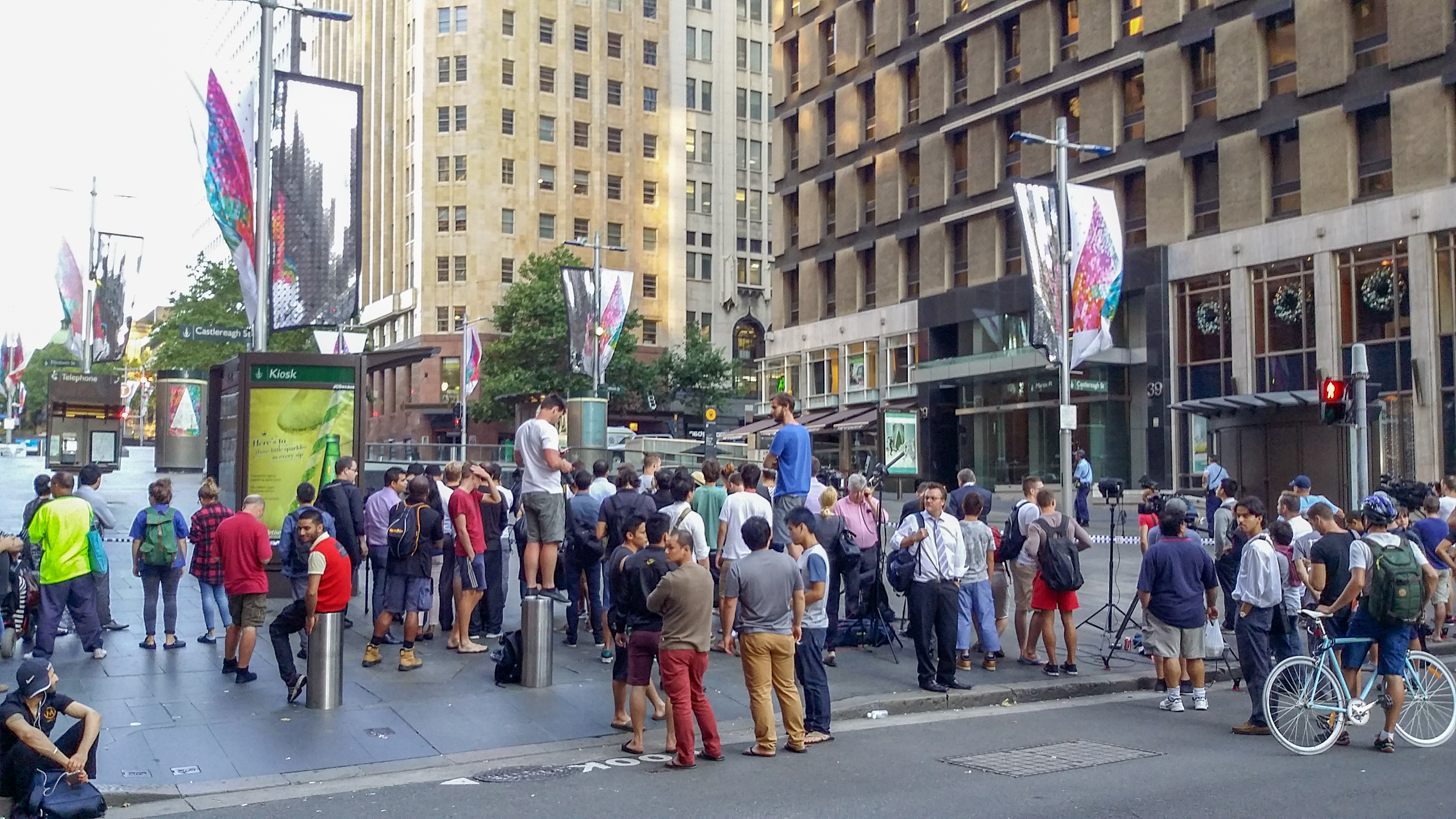
Onlookers in Martin Place during the siege of the Lindt Café

Hostages were forced to hold a copy of this flag against windows

Monis entered the Lindt Chocolate Café at 53 Martin Place, Sydney, at 8:33 am Sydney local time on 15 December 2014 (AEDT, UTC+11). The café was located directly across from the Seven News television studios, and near the Reserve Bank of Australia, the headquarters of the Commonwealth Bank, Westpac, and Martin Place underground train station.

The hostage situation began at 9:44 am, when Monis forced Tori Johnson, the manager of the café, to phone 000.

Monis was bearded, wearing a black cap and wearing a black headband with the inscription, in Arabic: "We are ready to sacrifice for you, O Mohammad." He was carrying a blue sports bag, and armed with a sawn-off pump-action shotgun. The shotgun was old but could fire four shots in five seconds.

Monis used hostages as human shields. He had chained and locked the automatic sliding glass doors of the café.

Monis claimed there were four "devices" located around Sydney. Then New South Wales Police Commissioner Andrew Scipione said that none of the alleged devices were found during searches. Monis also demanded that a hostage ask all media to broadcast that "this is an attack on Australia by the Islamic State". In addition, he demanded that an Islamic State flag be delivered to him, although the request was never fulfilled.

Hostages were ordered to hold up a Black Standard flag, with the shahādah in white Arabic letters (an Islamic creed declaring: "There is no God but Allah, and Muhammad is the messenger of God"), against the window of the café. Some news reports initially mistook it for the flag used by the Islamic State of Iraq and the Levant (ISIL).

Monis demanded to speak to the Australian Prime Minister live on radio, but this demand was rejected. This was relayed by hostage Marcia Mikhael, who said that she "lost it" when told that the Prime Minister was too busy, saying, "I don't care what [Abbott] is doing right now...I'm sure there's nothing more important happening in Australia...than the lives of the people in this café..."

Mamdouh Habib said he knew Monis well and offered to help the NSWPF negotiate with him. He believed that Monis was "sick and disturbed" over his failure to gain access to his children, and said Monis could trust him to get his message out. Lawyer Manny Conditsis had represented Monis and had also offered help because he said that Monis respected what he had to say to him. Barrister Michael Klooster who had met Monis in the café before the siege called the police at 2:17 pm. Other Muslim leaders also offered to help, including the Grand Mufti of Australia, Ibrahim Abu Mohamed.

All such offers were rejected by the police because they had no control over what the untrained negotiators might say or do. However, Mikhael said that after the request to speak to the Prime Minister was refused: "It was then that I knew that there was not going to be any negotiation and we were just left there. ...They were waiting for him to kill someone or shoot something so they [could] come in. ...There was nothing proactive about that operation, nothing."

Belinda Neil, who was a negotiator for the NSW Police, stated that in negotiations, "[W]e want to try and talk to the hostage-taker. ...[W]e want to find out why he's there, why is he doing this, and we don't just go into this situation hoping to resolve it in half an hour." This approach would be consistent with the Behavioral Change Stairway Model. However, Mikhael stated that no such negotiation took place. Habib said that he called both the NSWPF and the Attorney General twice during the raid, but they did not return his calls. Police Commissioner Andrew Scipione confirmed during the siege that "we're not dealing directly with him ... we do not have direct contact with the offender."

Several hostages made contact with media outlets and relayed Monis' demands to them. At the request of the New South Wales Police Force, they were not published during the siege. The social media profiles of the hostages were also used to relay demands.

At 1:43 am, Tori Johnson texted his family "He's [Monis] increasingly agitated, walks around when he hears a noise outside with a hostage in front of him. Wants to release one person in good faith, tell police." This was reported to the police ten minutes later.

During the early stages of the siege, the Australian Government and the NSW authorities did not label the event as a terrorist attack. However, as the siege continued, NSW Police authorised the engagement of the state's counter-terrorism task force, treating the incident as an act of terrorism.

=== Escape of first five hostages ===
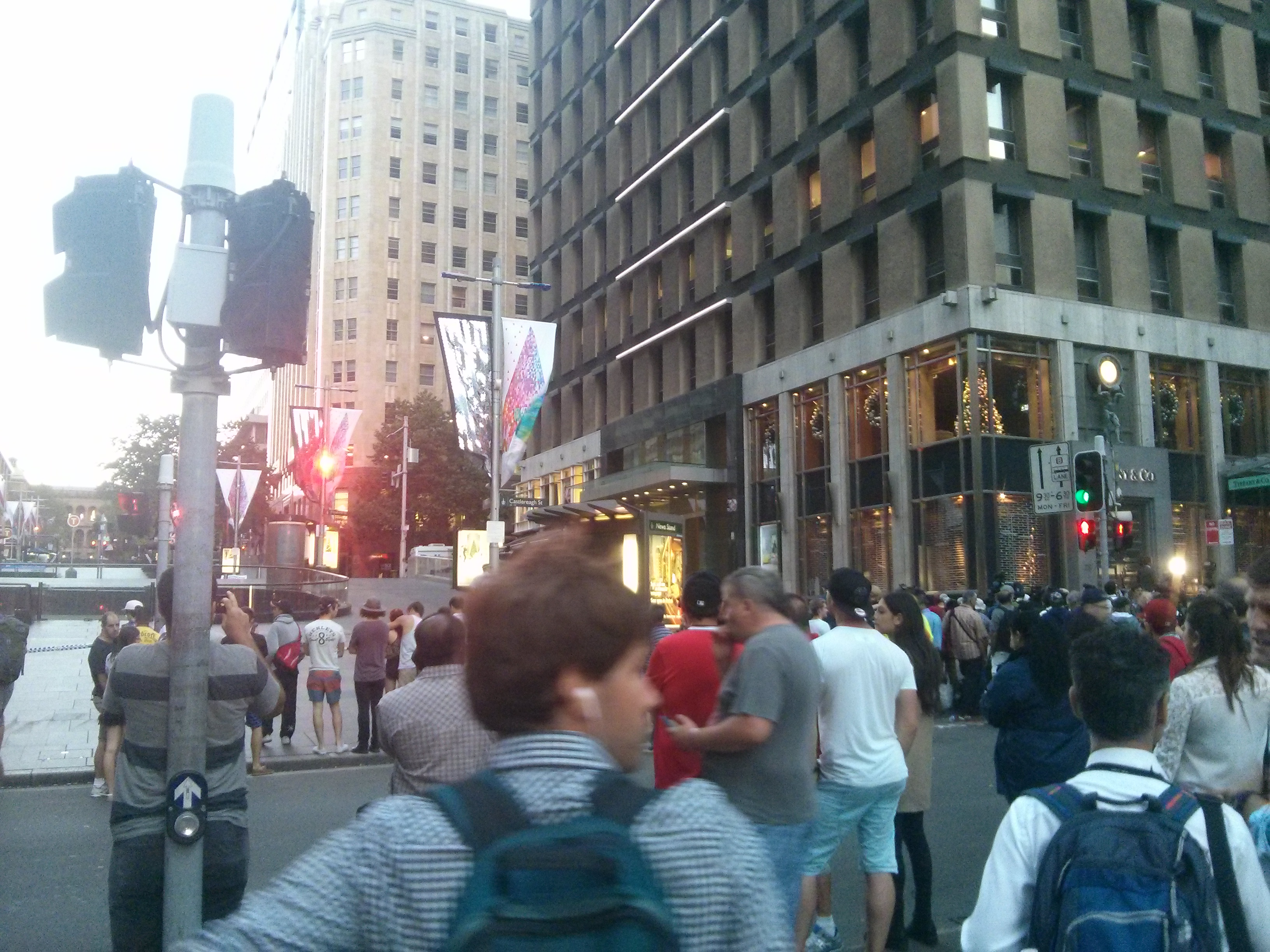
Crowds outside the Tiffany & Co. store in Martin Place during the evening

At around 3:37 pm, two hostages, John O'Brien and barrister Stefan Balafoutis, escaped from the front entrance of the building, followed by a third hostage, café employee Paolo Vassallo, who ran out from a fire exit at the side of the building. At around 4:58 pm, two female hostages, both employees, Jieun Bae and Elly Chen, escaped by running from another entrance of the building and were met by Tactical Operations Unit officers.

Monis was unaware that Jieun Bae and Elly Chen had escaped. Hostage Jarrod Morton-Hoffman made noise to cover their exit and persuaded Monis that media reports of five hostages escaping were wrong. After the escape, Monis threatened to kill hostages.

The police State Technical Investigation Branch planted a covert listening device in the café during the night. At one point, the device picked up Monis saying that he wanted to kill any escaping hostages.

=== Breach and hostage rescue ===
At 2:03 am on 16 December, a "very loud bang" was heard as Monis shot towards six hostages fleeing from the building. At 2:11 am Monis fired a shot towards the kitchen, and was heard on the police listening device reloading his shotgun. The hostage Fiona Ma then escaped through the front door, and two Tactical Operations Unit teams were ordered to move very slowly towards the two entrances.

At 2:14 am, four minutes after the Tactical operations teams were ordered in, Monis shot Tori Johnson in the back of the head, killing him. The execution was witnessed by TOU sniper Sierra 3-1, who reported a hostage down. TOU Operators armed with M4A1 carbines threw eleven stun grenades as they stormed the café.

Monis was shot in the head. TOU Officer A – later identified as Ben Besant, whose identity was the subject of a suppression order only lifted in 2024 – stated that "I watched the (Carbine) laser ... from the centre of his chest go to his head and his head exploded and he fell". Besant fired a total of 17 rounds, and Officer B fired 5 additional rounds. Some fragments of those rounds killed hostage Katrina Dawson. Three other hostages and TOU Officer B were injured by crossfire.

Police declared the siege over soon after, later confirming that Monis was killed in the hostage rescue. Two hostages had died, and another three were injured by police bullets. TOU Officer B, whose face was grazed by a police bullet, was discharged from hospital later in the day.

At the inquest, Counsel assisting the coroner, Jeremy Gormley SC, said, "No shot fired by Mr. Monis, other than the one that struck and killed Mr. Johnson, struck anyone." Mitchell McAlister, who was a TAG East assaulter with the 2nd Commando Tactical Assault Group questioned the police use of M4A1 carbines with 5.56mm NATO rounds. Carbine rounds could have "dangerous effects in a dense and enclosed environment." It was initially unclear why 22 shots were fired by police, of which 13 hit Monis. The rounds were continuously fired in the belief that the hostage taker could reach for a bomb trigger.

=== Flag raids ===
At around 2:00 pm on 15 December, police contacted Rebecca Kay, a member of the Muslim community, and asked her to help source an ISIS flag for Monis. Kay contacted many people in the Muslim community but ultimately the police sourced their own flag. However, the flag was never given to Monis.

The following day, NSW and Federal Police raided three homes of people who had been contacted in the attempt to source the flag. Kay assumes that her conversations had been monitored. Kay said she would help police in another crisis, but "with this incident they have not built trust at all. You don't understand...the fear that [the AFP and ASIO] create, and how they stalk...members of our community..." Lawyer Zali Burrows questioned the purpose of the police contacting Kay in the first place, stating, "Why didn't they just print [a flag]?"

=== Police strategy ===
The NSW Police Force followed a "contain and negotiate" strategy to avoid any direct action unless a hostage was killed or injured. They decided that this strategy could deliver a "peaceful negotiated outcome" because Monis had not harmed any hostages, despite having threatened to do so. Monis had not reacted violently to the escape of five hostages on two separate occasions, or due to none of his demands being met. Further, Monis claimed to have a bomb, and "if the bomb was triggered, all of those inside the café and those attempting a rescue were not likely to survive". At 8:20 pm and again at 11:35 pm, the head of the Tactical Operations Unit attempted to persuade the other commanders to take a "Deliberate Action" plan and storm the café. This plan was overruled by Task Force Pioneer commanders and Assistant Commissioner Mark Jenkins due to the danger to the hostages and police officers. TOU snipers could not fire due to "the narrow windows, the moving around of Monis, the risk to hostages if there was a missed shot, (and) the position of the snipers behind glass".

At 11:00 am, Operational Commander Mick Fuller approved negotiations for the release of half of the 18 hostages in return for Monis being allowed to talk on ABC radio. However, the Negotiation Commander decided not to do so because it conflicted with a standing policy to not negotiate with terrorists.

The first negotiator was not told that the Grand Mufti of Australia and a barrister who represented Monis had offered to help negotiate with Monis. He only found out about Monis's demand for the ABC to broadcast that Australia was under attack after a Facebook post from one of the hostages was read out on radio 2GB. Monis had also demanded that the Christmas lights be turned off. The first negotiator thought that doing this would have provided an opportunity to bargain with Monis, but he did not hear back from commanders as to whether it was possible so "discarded" the option.

He was then relieved by a second negotiator, but did not tell him about the demand that the Christmas lights be turned off. Hostage Selina Win Pe told the second negotiator Monis wanted to know why it hadn't happened. It was later revealed an Ausgrid team had assembled to switch off the lights, but was sent home.

A third negotiator later said that he did not have the Christmas lights turned off because he had to have reassurance that the hostage taker would not carry out his threat to kill Win Pe. He said there was some "step-by-step" process to have the hostages released (after nineteen hours). Jenkins says he would have liked the Christmas lights turned off quickly, and was unaware that this had been found to be possible. Jenkins was also not told about the Johnson text near the end of the siege that Monis wanted to release a hostage.

The Negotiation Unit leader did not think Monis would hurt anyone, since Monis had told people inside the café that everyone would go home once Prime Minister Tony Abbott called. The team leader later conceded that Abbott was never going to call. An unnamed civilian Forensic Psychiatrist was the consultant for NSW Police. The psychiatrist gave forensic advice that Monis was probably undertaking a grandiose act to be recognised as a figure of great infamy rather than wishing to hurt anyone. He doubted that Monis actually represented ISIS because he did not have the correct flag, nor that his actions were politically motivated. The psychiatrist warned that "a wounded narcissist is a dangerous specimen", as none of Monis' demands were met.

=== Timeline of events ===
Here is the timeline of events during the siege in Lindt café. All times given are in Australian Eastern Daylight Time, (UTC+11:00).

8:33 am	Monis enters the café.
9:44 am	Monis draws a shotgun, orders doors locked.
11:00 am	Operational Commander Mick Fuller approves negotiations for the release of half of the 18 hostages in return for Monis being allowed to talk on ABC radio. However, the negotiation commander decided not to do so because it conflicted with a standing policy not to negotiate with terrorists.
3:37 pm	Three hostages escape.
4:00 pm	News reporters describe three hostages' escape, and Monis becomes increasingly paranoid.
4:58 pm	Two more hostages escape.
5:00 pm	Negotiators call Monis, answered by hostage Mikhael, indicate they knew Monis' identity. Monis did not like being referred to as Sheikh Haron.
5:55 pm	Monis is frustrated his message is not getting out: hostages suggest uploading to Facebook and YouTube.
8:38 pm	Mikhael asked for Christmas lighting to be turned off.
10:30 pm	Ausgrid team assemble to switch off Christmas lights, but they are sent home.
10:30 pm	Assistant Commissioner Mark Jenkins and a "forward commander" hold a teleconference saying they will continue to "contain and (in theory) negotiate".
12:30 am	Four calls from hostage Win Pe to negotiators go unanswered. She calls 000 and says she will be shot if the Christmas lights are not turned off.
1:43 am	Johnson texts family that Monis is becoming increasingly agitated and wants to release one hostage in good faith.
2:03 am	Monis moves hostages around the café: six hostages take the opportunity to flee. Monis fires first shot.
2:13 am	Monis executes hostage Johnson; Fiona Ma escapes.
2:13 am	Tactical Operations Unit breach the café. TOU neutralises Monis, hitting Dawson in friendly fire. Crossfire wounds three other hostages and a TOU Operator.

== Hostages ==
Authorities did not release an estimate of the number of hostages inside the café during the siege. After the siege, a total of 18 hostages was confirmed—eight staff and ten customers of the café including lawyers and Westpac employees with offices close by. Initial estimates varied, with some significantly overestimating the number.

Tori Johnson, the 34-year-old manager of the café, died after being shot in the head by Monis. Katrina Dawson, a 38-year-old barrister, was killed by crossfire when she was hit by seven police bullet fragments. Dawson was lying behind a chair that was hit by 10 bullets.

Three hostages and TOU Officer B were wounded by police crossfire during the raid. The three hostages were Marcia Mikhael, who was shot in the leg; Robyn Hope, a 75-year-old woman who was shot in the shoulder; and Louisa Hope, her 52-year-old daughter, who was shot in the foot. All three were in a stable condition after treatment. Paolo Vassallo, one of the five hostages who initially escaped the scene, was hospitalised for a pre-existing condition. The other hostages were identified as John O'Brien, Stefan Balafoutis, Elly Chen, Jieun Bae, Harriette Denny, Viswakanth Ankireddy, Joel Herat, Fiona Ma, Jarrod Morton-Hoffman, Puspendu Ghosh, Selina Win Pe, and Julie Taylor.

Memorial services for Johnson and Dawson were held on 23 December: Johnson's in the morning at St Stephen's Uniting Church, Sydney, and Dawson's in the afternoon in the Great Hall of the University of Sydney. Interviews with some of the hostages were later recorded for television and broadcast, amid some controversy.

== Evacuations and closures ==
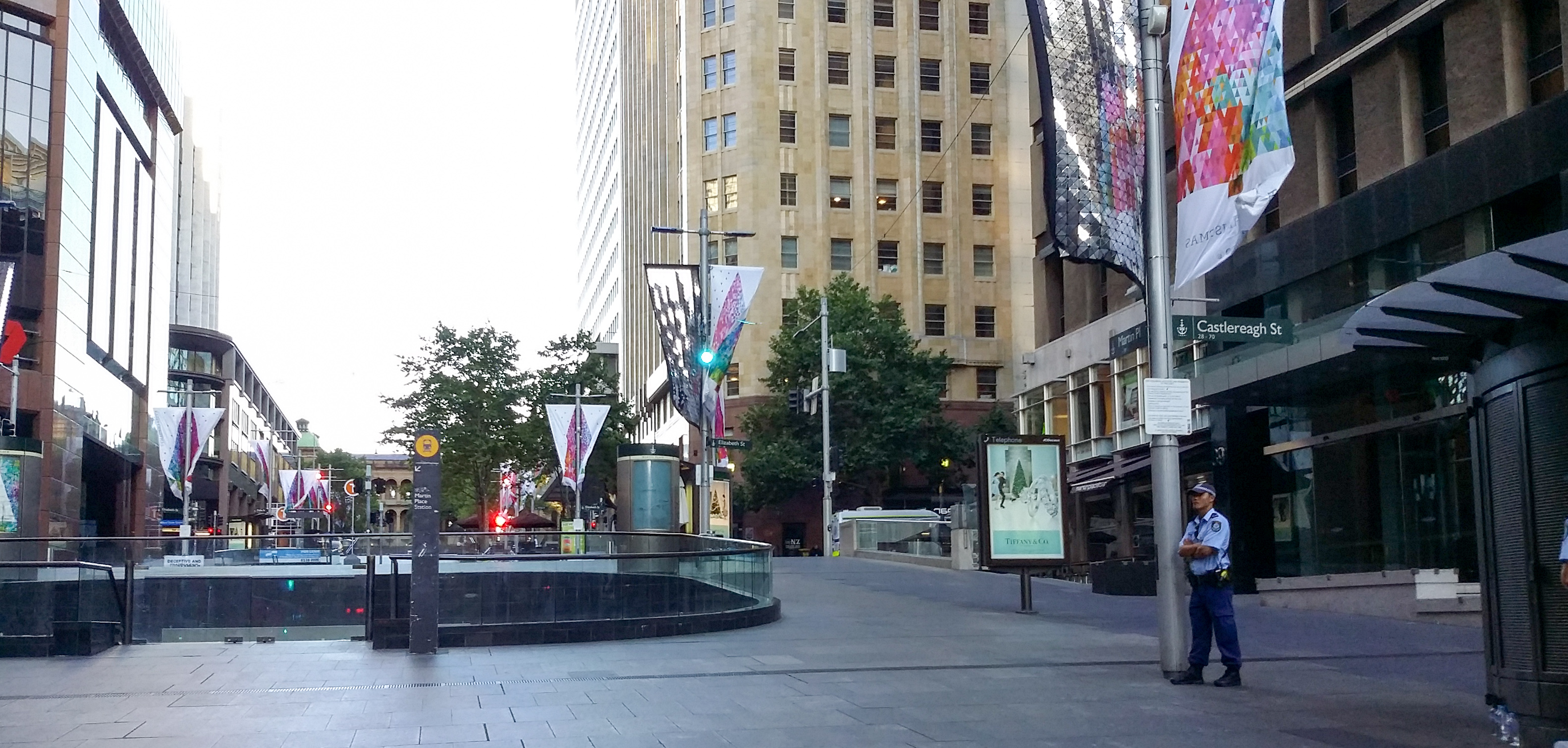
Police blocking Martin Place near the Lindt café

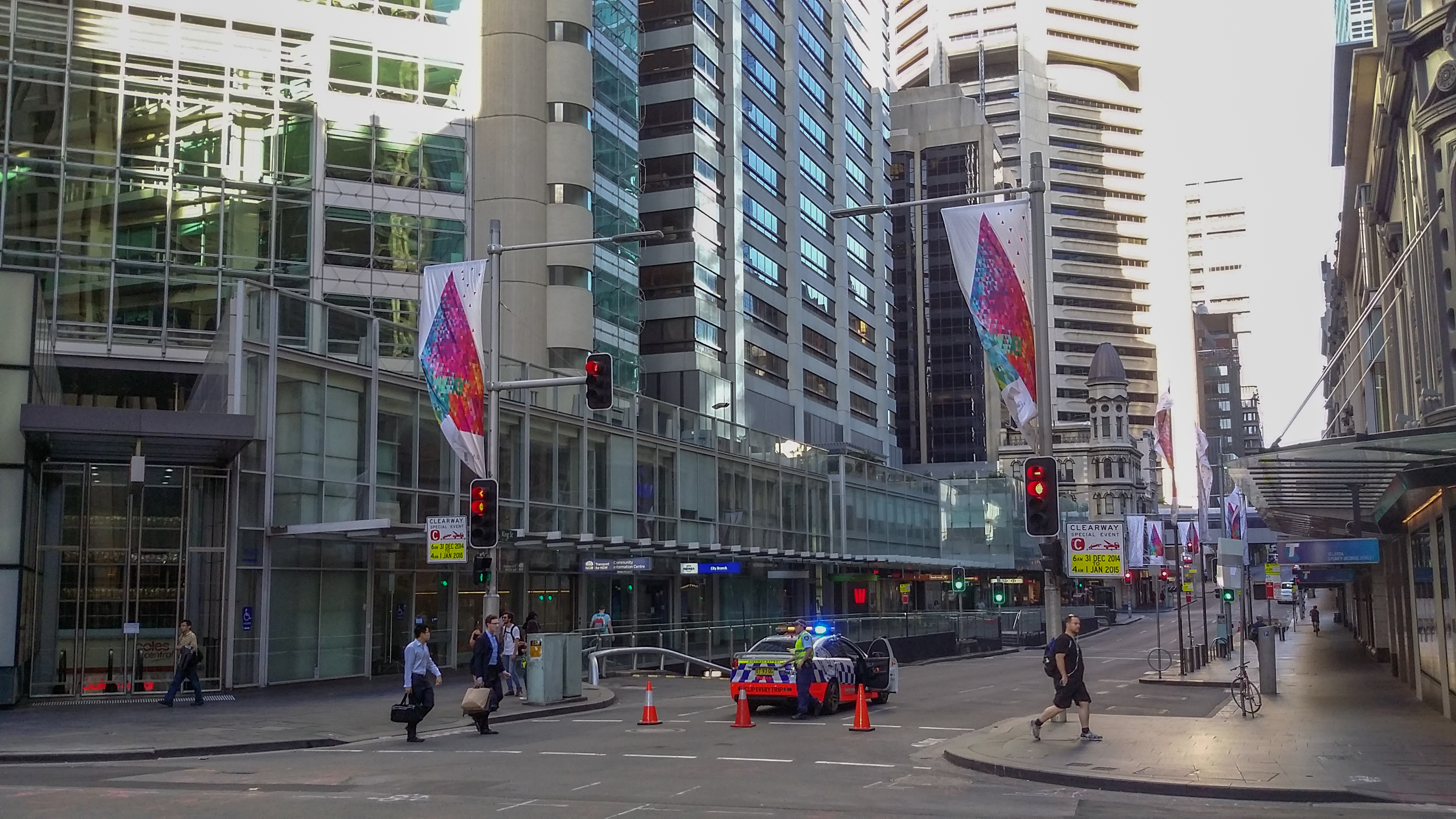
Road closures on King Street

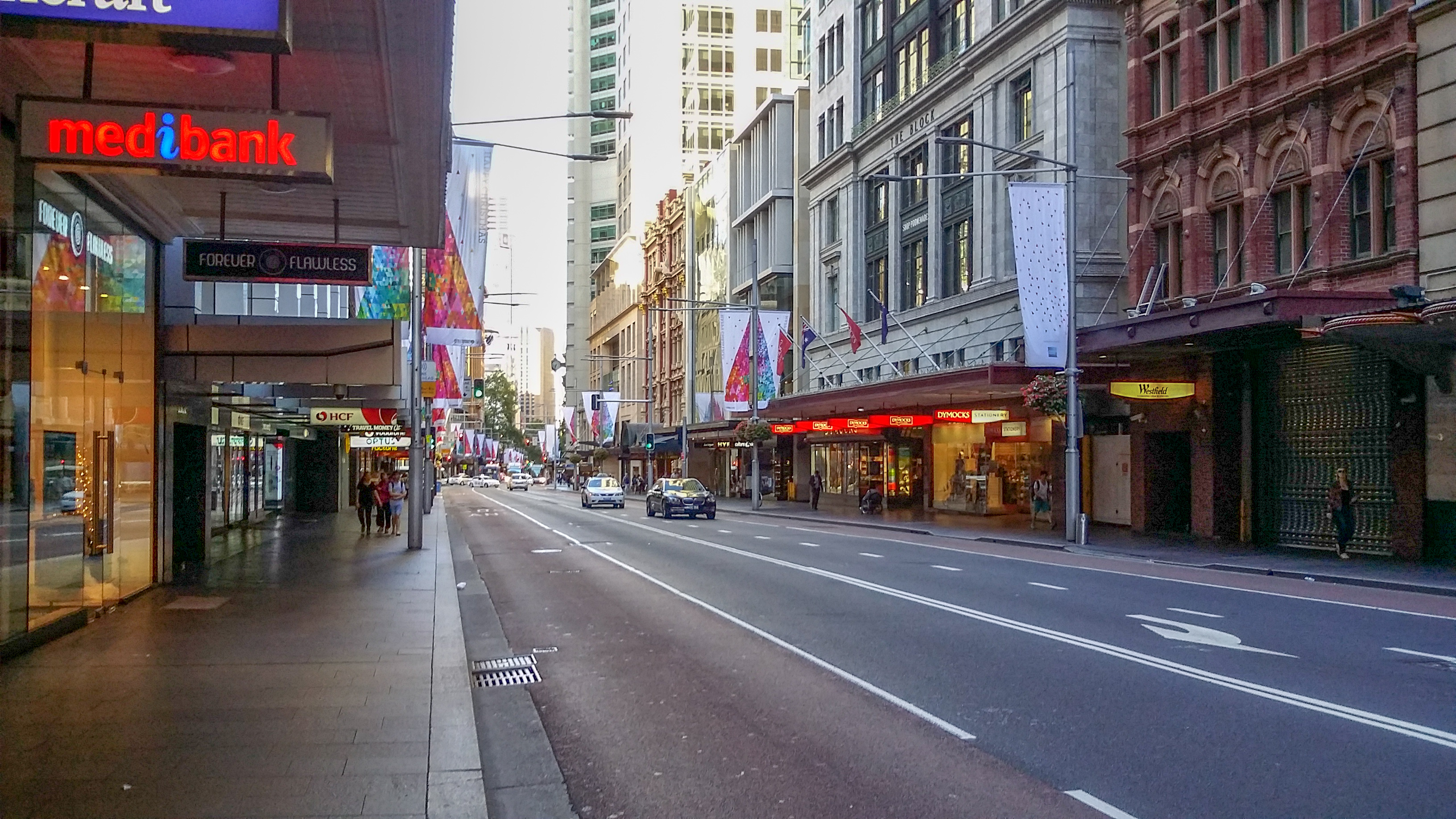
Desolated George Street during the siege

After the siege began, a staged exclusion zone was established with thousands of people evacuated from nearby buildings, including the floors above the café. The Sydney Opera House was evacuated after a suspicious package was found; however, reports were unconfirmed by police. The US Consulate General in Sydney, located in Martin Place, was also evacuated. Some Sydney schools were put in "white level lockout" due to the hostage situation, which meant that no school group was permitted to leave the school grounds.

Police advised people in the area bounded by Hunter, George, Elizabeth, and Macquarie streets, bordering Martin Place, to remain indoors and away from windows. Commonwealth Bank, Westpac, and ANZ closed their CBD branches for the day. The State Library was also closed. Numerous other buildings, including David Jones stores, executive offices for the New South Wales Parliament, criminal courts for the Supreme Court, the Downing Centre, and "several city legal chambers" were evacuated, as were the facilities of the Seven Network, situated directly across from the café, forcing The Morning Show to suspend transmission. Police established an emergency centre in nearby Hyde Park in response to the unfolding situation with emergency services sent to the staging post to respond to any immediate threats. Evacuees were relocated to the area as a safety precaution.

Trains did not stop at Martin Place railway station during the incident. Transport for NSW advised people to stay away from the CBD. Road closures prevented southbound access to the Cahill Expressway, York Street, and Harbour Street, and northbound access to the Cahill Expressway, and all traffic was diverted to the Sydney Harbour Tunnel. On the morning of 16 December, road diversions remained in place and Martin Place train station remained closed. In the evening of 16 December, Elizabeth Street, Macquarie Street and Hunter Street were opened to traffic.

Uber fares for travel in Sydney surged during the event under the company's dynamic pricing system, which led to criticism. Uber subsequently refunded excessive fares and provided free rides out of the CBD.

== Perpetrator ==
Iranian-born Monis was identified as the hostage-taker and named early on the morning of 16 December.

In September 2009, Monis was convicted for criminal use of the postal service to "menace, harass or cause offence", for a campaign protesting the presence of Australian troops in Afghanistan, by writing letters to the families of soldiers killed there, in which he called the soldiers murderers. On 12 December 2014 (three days before the siege), Monis lost his appeal against his conviction and was sentenced to 300 hours of community service. Monis had been charged with accessory to murder relating to the death of his former wife who was found stabbed eighteen times, and set alight, on 21 April 2013 at a unit block in Werrington. However, on 12 December 2013, Magistrate William Pierce said "It is a weak case" and granted Monis bail. In November 2016, Amirah Droudis was found guilty, in a judge-only trial, of the murder of Monis' ex-wife and sentenced to 44 years' jail.

Monis also had numerous charges of sexual assault, aggravated indecent assault, and common assault. On 14 April 2014, Monis was charged with three sexual assault offences against a woman and remanded in custody. He was granted bail on 26 May, six days after the Bail Act in New South Wales was rewritten based on recommendations by the New South Wales Law Reform Commission. On 10 October, he was charged with another 40 sexual assault offences against six more women, and his bail was continued.

Jeremy Gormly SC, counsel assisting the inquest, summarised Monis as "a complex, disturbed individual desperate for recognition and status but completely lacking the skills or achievements to bring that dream to life". Gormly summarised that "Monis could be plausible, courteous and controlled, but he was also almost entirely consumed in his own self-importance. ... By 2014, he owned no property, was in debt, and had developed no employment skills. His attempts to develop a personal, religious following ... had failed. ... He was facing future serious criminal charges... he had made no public impact of note on the Australian political scene". Monis may have felt that he had "little left to live for".

No weapons were found when police raided his home in 2013. From 1997 to 2000, Monis held a security guard licence, which would have let him carry a pistol between March and June 1997. The weapon that Monis used, a sawn-off French-made Manufrance La Salle pump-action shotgun, was more than 50 years old. Police believe the weapon was imported in the 1950s, when no registration was required. Monis had 23 shotgun cartridges of different brands on him, between 15 and 20 years old.

== Reactions ==
=== Leaders ===
The Prime Minister, Tony Abbott, convened the National Security Committee of Cabinet to give briefings on the situation and said "Australians should be reassured that our law enforcement and security agencies are well trained and equipped and are responding in a thorough and professional manner." He later said, "The whole point of politically motivated violence is to scare people out of being themselves. Australia is a peaceful, open, and generous society. Nothing should ever change that and that's why I would urge all Australians today to go about their business as usual", and "Australians should be reassured by the way our law enforcement and security agencies responded to this brush with terrorism."

The Premier of New South Wales, Mike Baird, addressed the media during the stand-off, and stated "we are being tested today... in Sydney. The police are being tested, the public is being tested, but whatever the test we will face it head on and we will remain a strong democratic, civil society. I have full confidence in the Police Commissioner and the incredible work of the NSW police force.

The Lord Mayor of Sydney, Clover Moore, on the morning of 16 December 2014, urged Australians to see this as a "one-off event", stating, "We're an inclusive multicultural community and we need to deal with this together". Governor-General of Australia, Sir Peter Cosgrove, released a statement sympathising with the families, commending the work of the police involved, and urging Australians to "unite in our resolve to protect what we value most—our way of life, our care and respect for each other".

=== Community ===
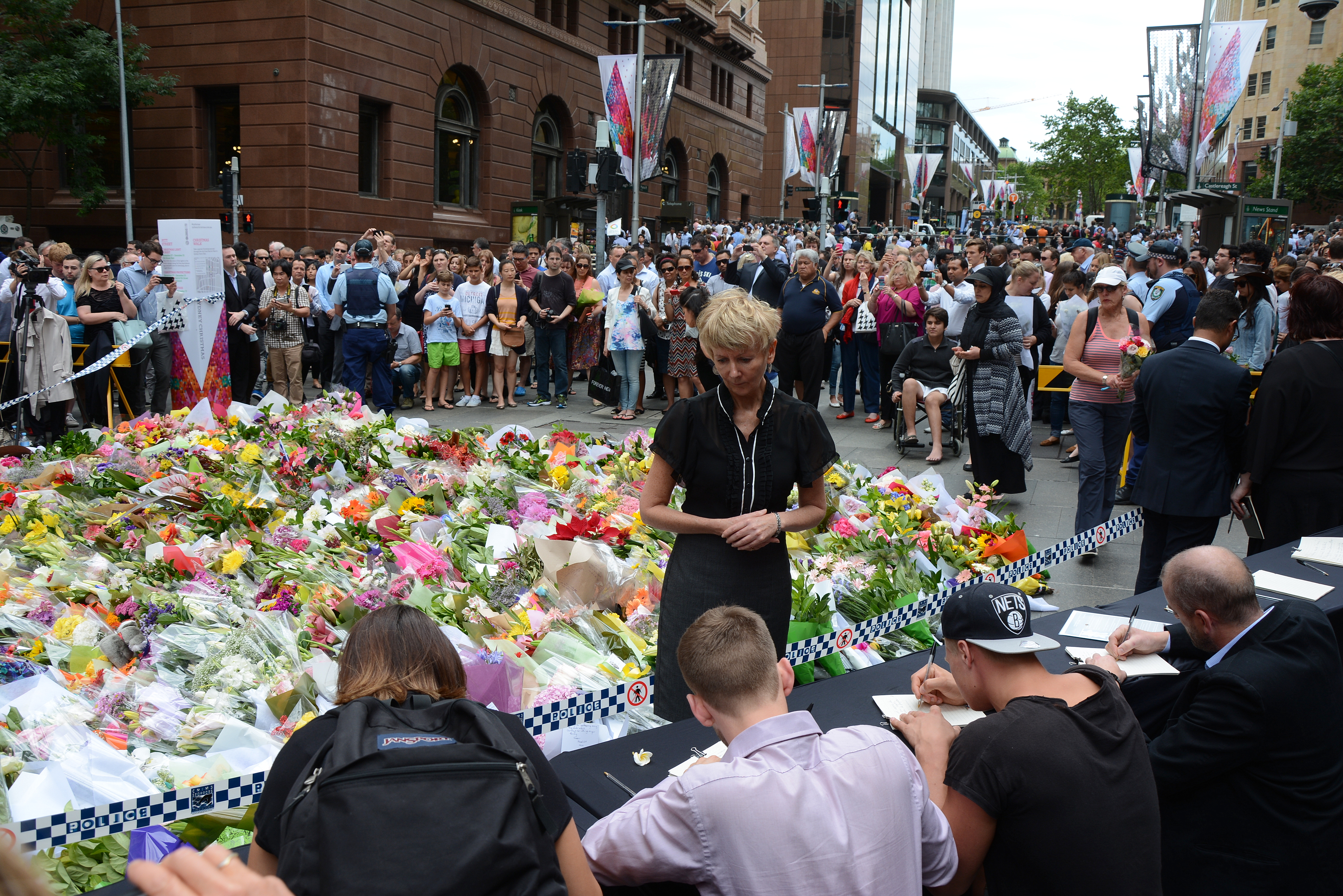
Members of the public sign condolence books in Martin Place after the siege

Thousands of people visited the site in the first few days after the incident to pay tribute to the victims. Among them were members of the families of Dawson and Johnson. Johnson's father was accompanied by rabbis Levi Wolff and Zalmen Kastel, Hindu priest Pandit Ramachandra, the Reverend Bill Crews and Sheikh Wesam Charkawi. Dawson's young daughter left her own note.

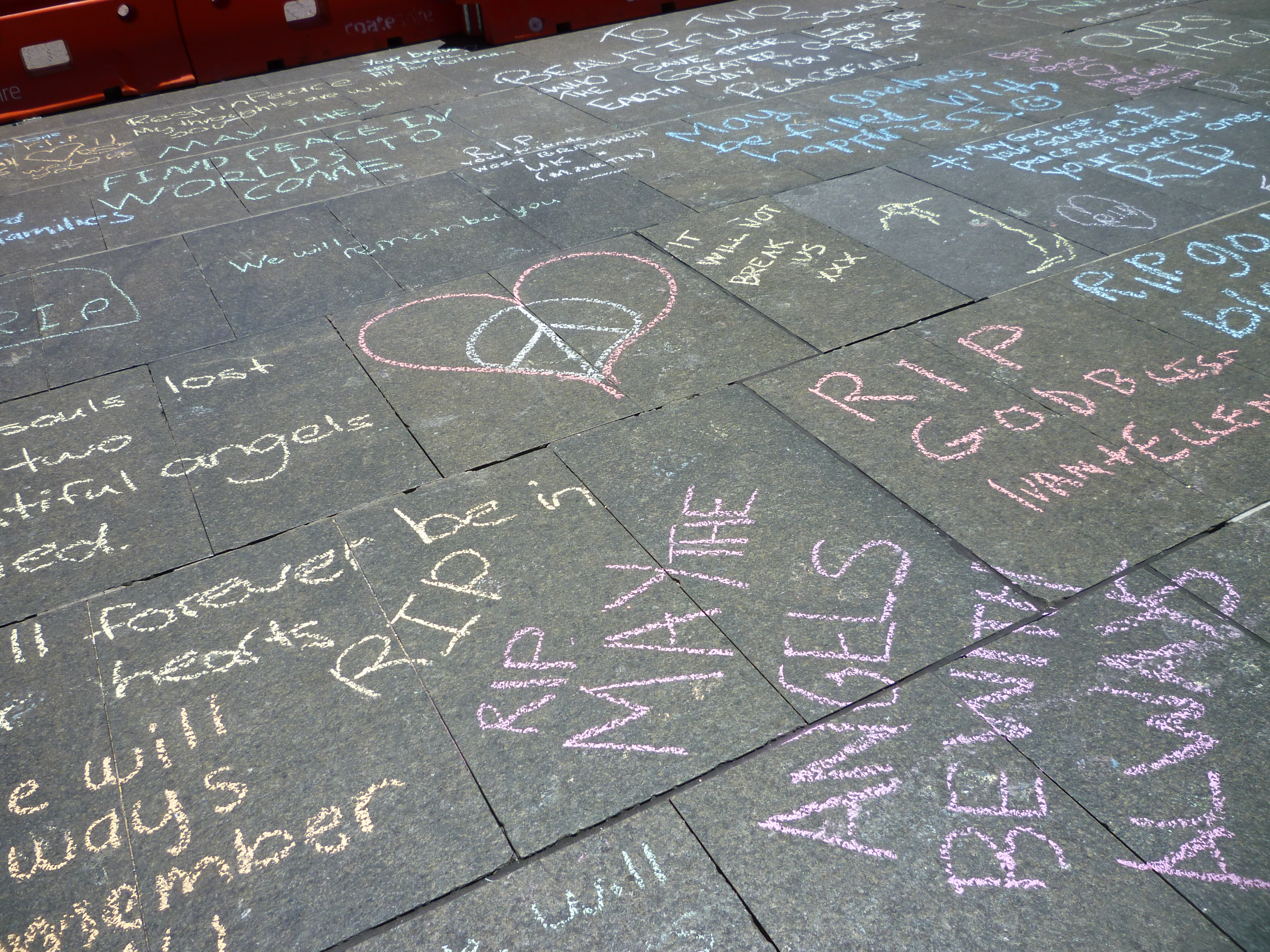
Chalk messages written on Martin Place after the event

Flags on all NSW government buildings, including the Sydney Harbour Bridge, flew at half-mast to honour the hostages who lost their lives at the café.

A magistrate who had granted Monis bail and the lawyers who had represented him in his court appearances received death threats in the days after the attack. This reaction was described by the Bar Association as "understandable but wrong-headed", as magistrates have to deal with cases as they come before them on the basis of the law at the time.

=== #illridewithyou campaign ===
During and immediately following the incident, some in the community expressed concern about an increased potential for violence or intimidation directed at Muslims in Australia. For example, the head of the Australian Muslim Women's Association told the media there was an increase in anti-Muslim messages being posted on social media. Due to this concern among some local social media users, many started using the hashtag #illridewithyou [I'll ride with you]. This sought to offer solidarity and emotional support to Muslims travelling alone on public transport by people tweeting their bus/train route and suggesting that they would be willing to "ride with" anyone who might feel threatened. More than 150,000 people indicated their support of the concept by using the hashtag. The campaign was initially inspired by a Facebook status update about offering to walk with a woman who had removed her head covering. The campaign received international attention, including from United States President Barack Obama, although federal National Party member of Parliament George Christensen criticised the campaign for creating "false victims" out of Muslims and thereby taking attention away from the hostages.

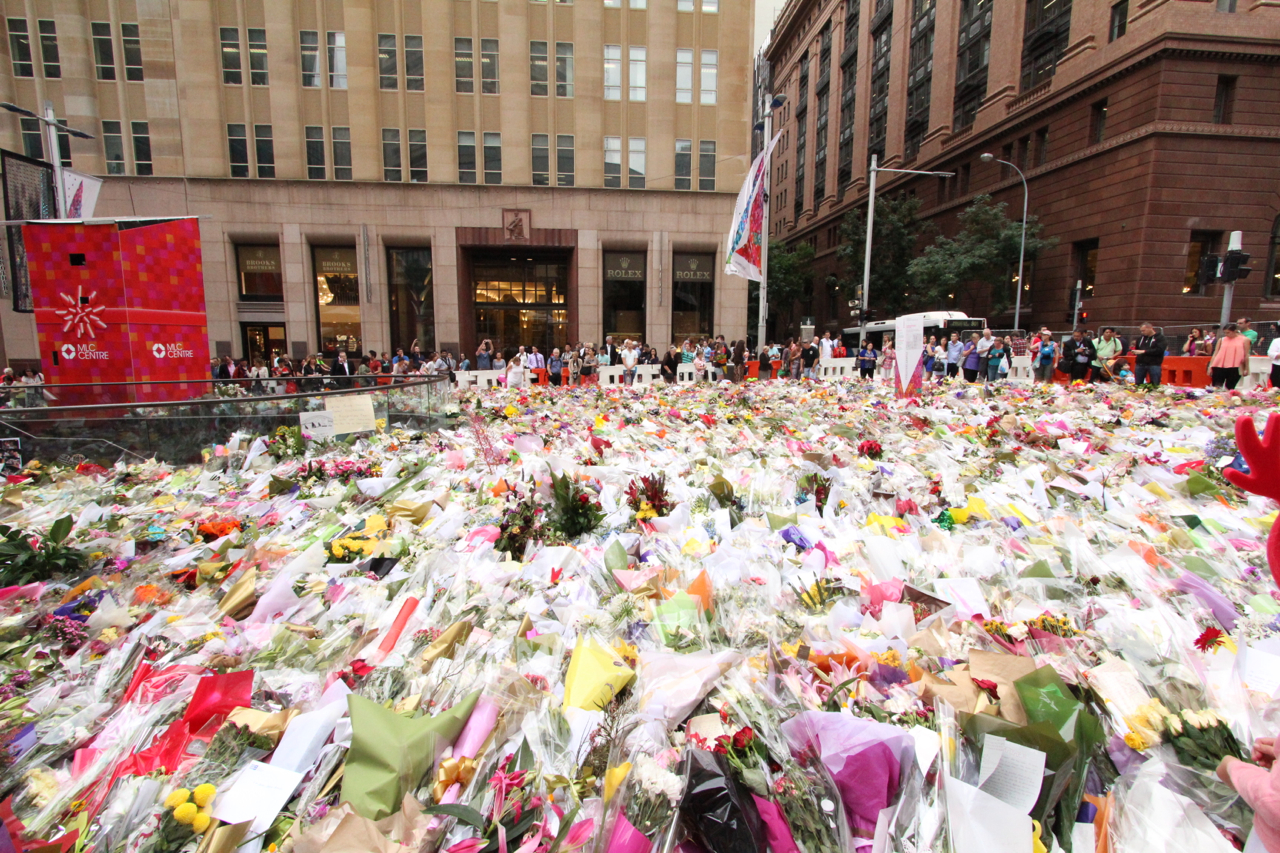
"Field of Flowers" Martin Place on 19 December 2014

==== "Field of flowers" ====
On the morning of 16 December 2014, after police declared the crisis to be over, a makeshift memorial began to take shape in Martin Place. From the first bunch of lilies, tributes developed into a field of flowers that "you can smell before you can see" and which was extensively reported and photographed. The Prime Minister and NSW Premier were among many in the community to lay flowers at the memorial in a demarcated space. Flowers were also taken to suburban Lindt shops.

Volunteers from the Rural Fire Service, the State Emergency Service and the Red Cross began clearing the flowers on 22 December 2014 after consultation with the families, because rain was expected. It was announced that the condolence books would be bound in several volumes and one complete copy provided to each family. The messages on the many cards were to be digitised. During the week after the siege, it was estimated that 110,000 bouquets were laid at Martin Place.

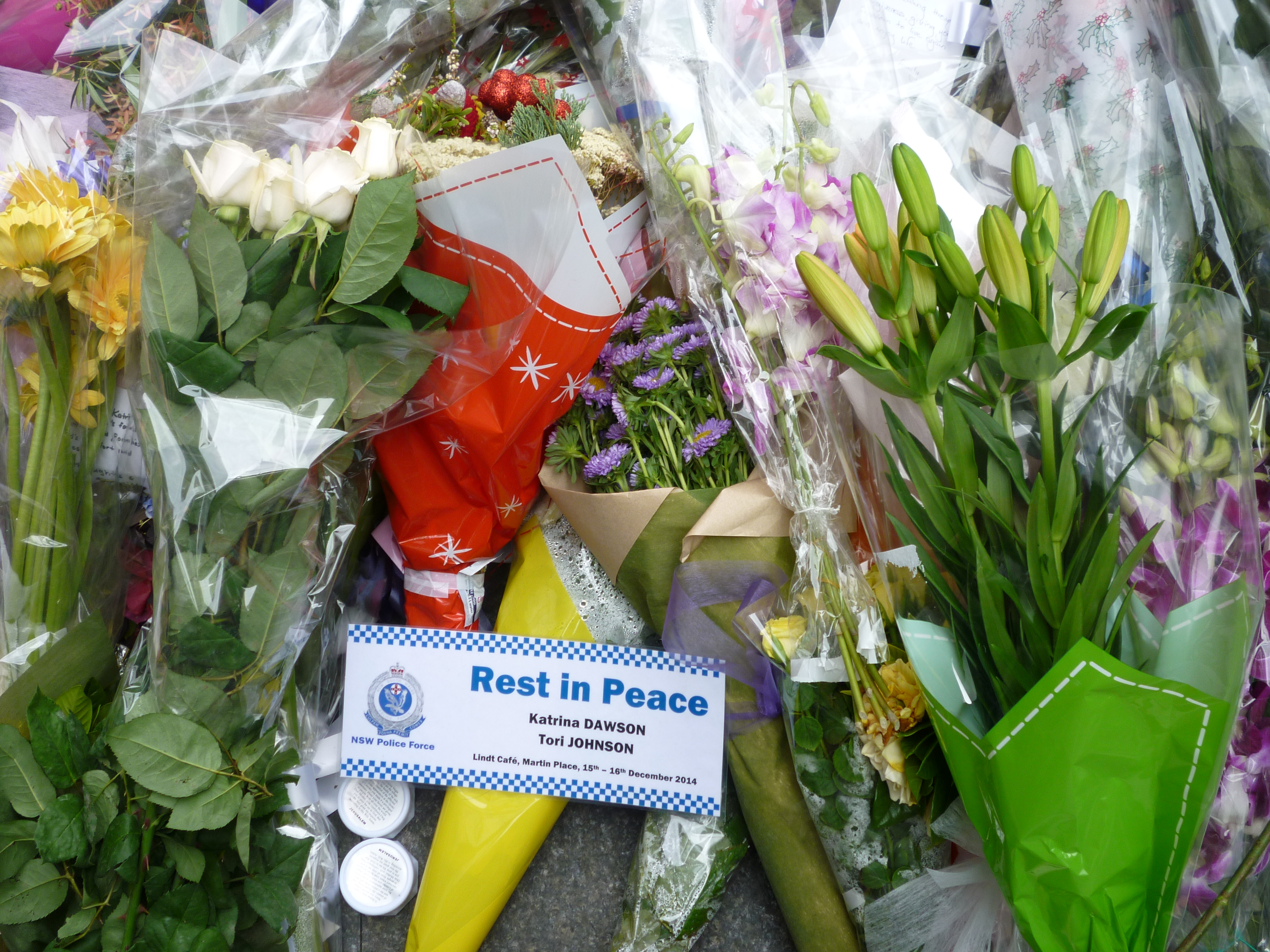
From the NSW Police Force

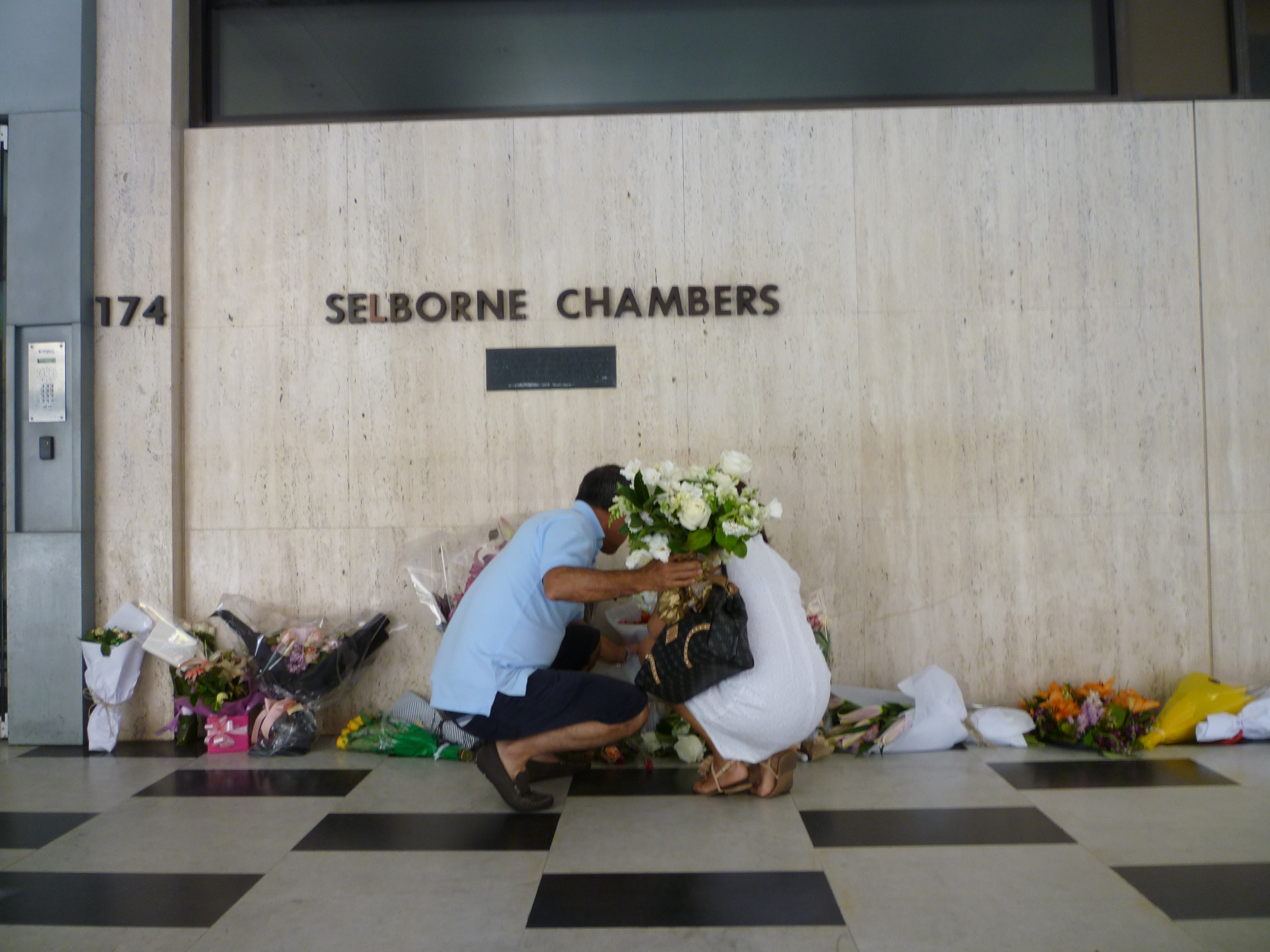
Outside Selborne Chambers

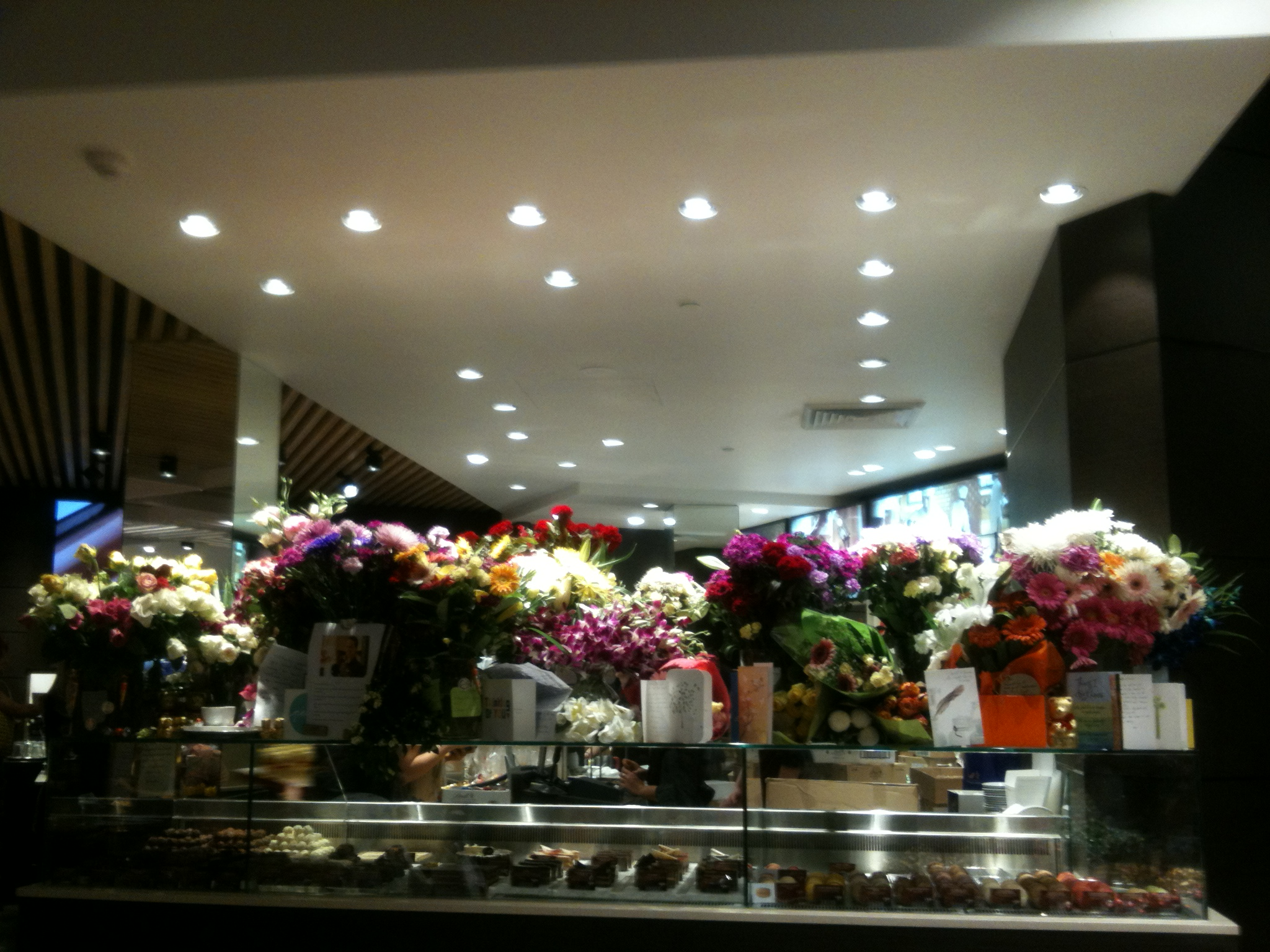
Floral tributes at the Lindt café in Westfield Miranda

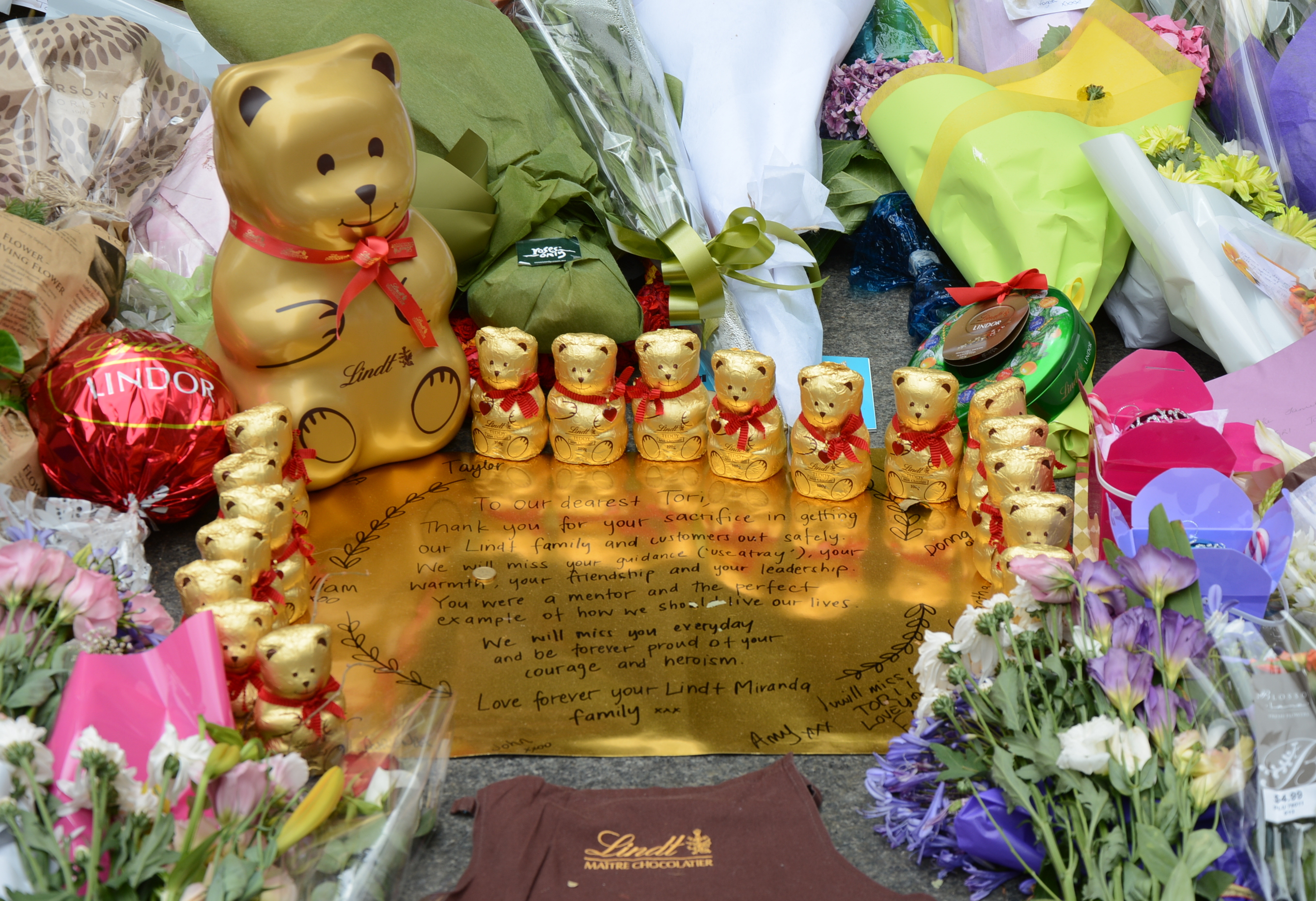
Lindt's response to the shooting

=== Religious organisations ===
During the siege, Sanier Dandan, president of the Lebanese Muslim Association, informed ABC News that Australian Muslim leaders were meeting online for discussions as to how the Muslim community could help with the situation. He added, "Regardless, we have a hostage situation. Whether he is someone who belongs to the Australian Muslim community or not, we are still waiting for information to be provided by police and based on that if there's something the Muslim community can do or assist, we are there."

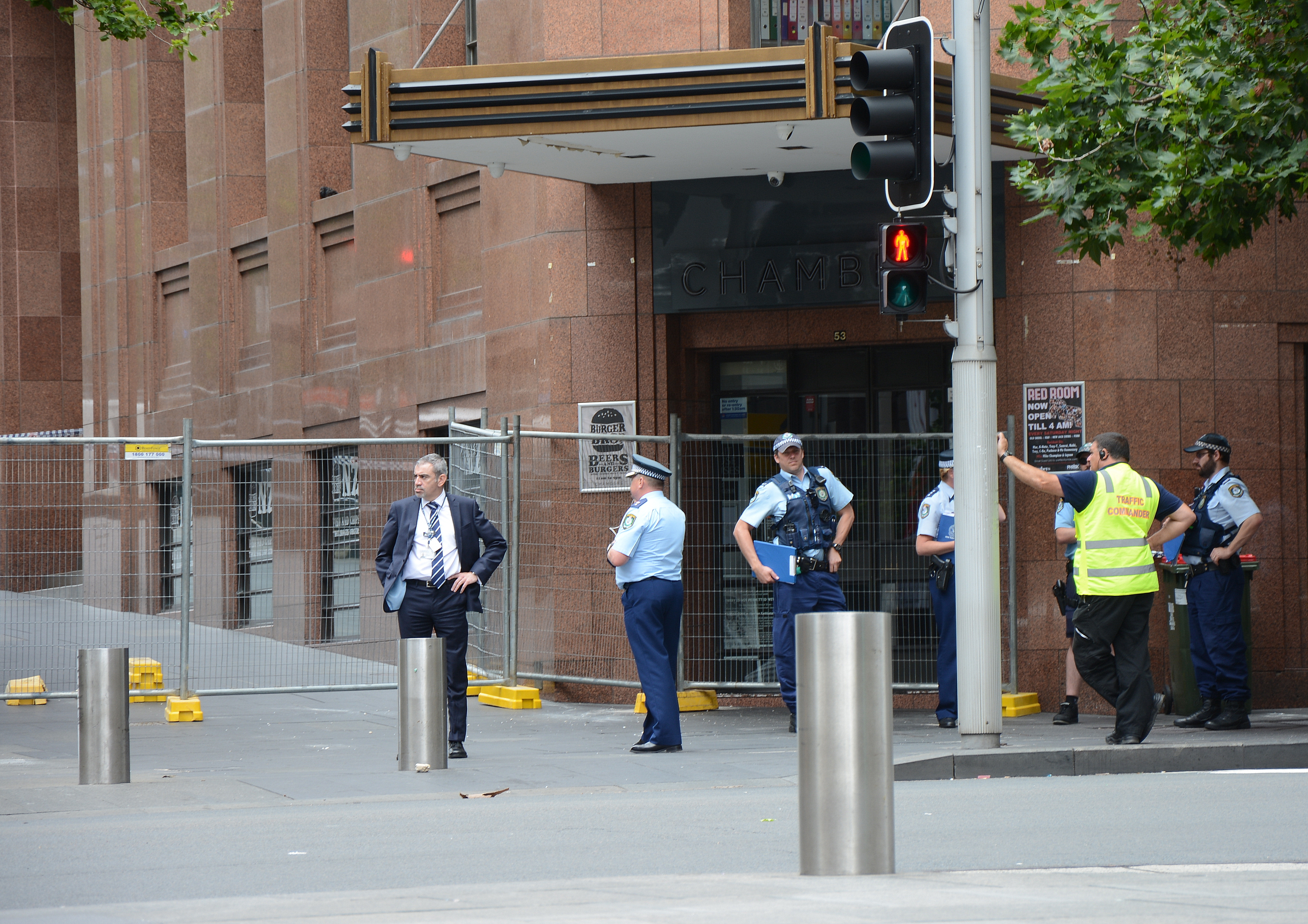
One day after the siege, police blocked off the area of Martin Place involved

Ibrahim Abu Mohamed, the Grand Mufti of Australia, condemned the incident in a statement released on 15 December. The same afternoon, around fifty Muslim groups issued a joint statement in which they condemned the incident. The Australian Ahmadiyya Muslim Association condemned the incident, the national president saying that "such actions are criminal and totally contrary to the teachings of Islam." Egypt's Grand Mufti Shawqi Allam also condemned the attack.

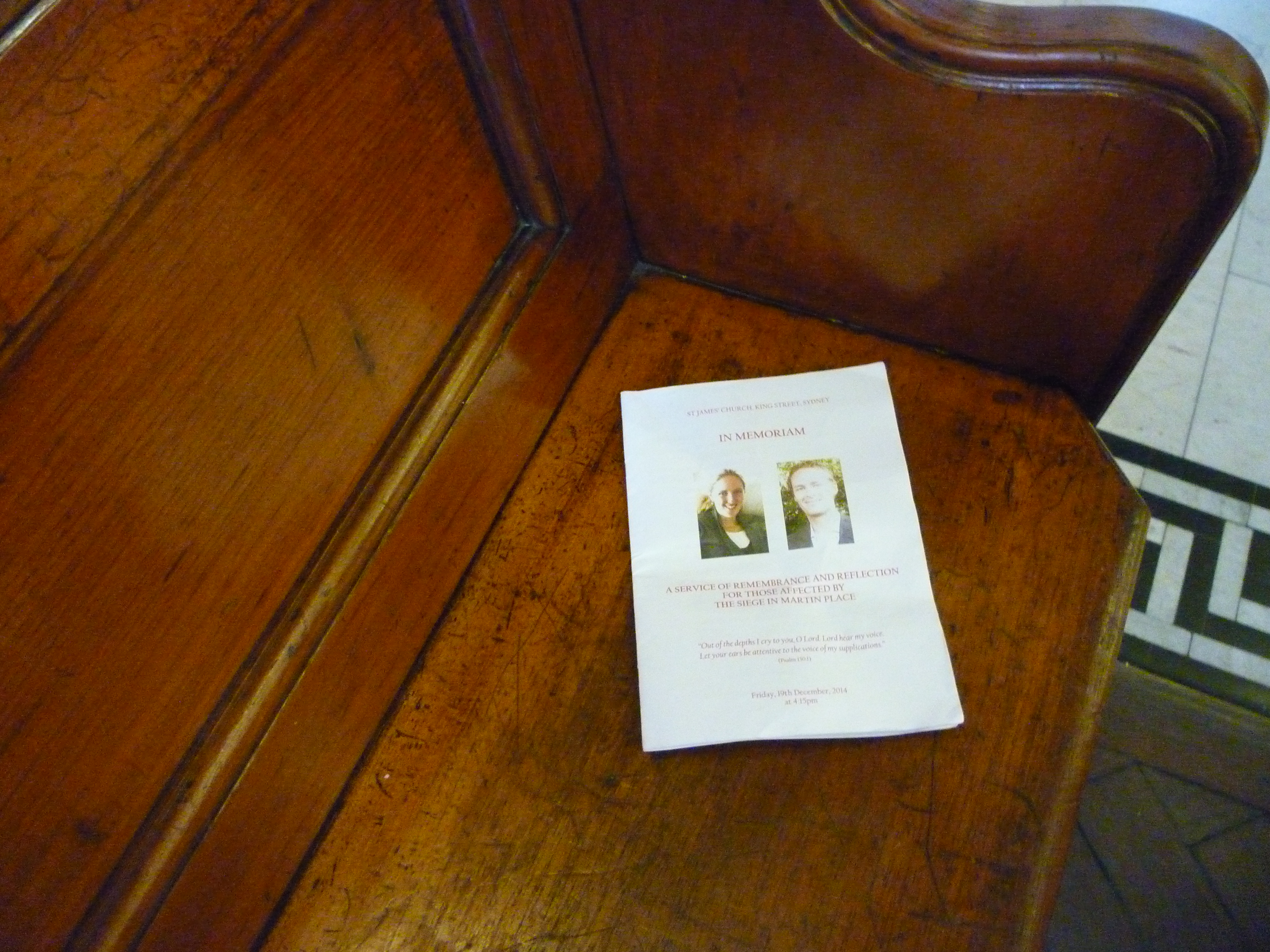
Order of Service of memorial for Dawson and Johnson in St James' Church on 19 December 2014

In Martin Place, the 2014 traditional Hanukkah menorah presented a message of support: "May the lights of the festival of Hanukkah bring comfort and warmth to our nation".

The Catholic Archbishop of Sydney, Anthony Fisher, invoked the special prayers in the Roman Missal from the "Mass in times of civil disturbance" and a memorial service was held at St Mary's Cathedral, on the morning of 19 December.

St James' Church, which had been within the exclusion zone, held a "Service of Remembrance and Reflection" on the afternoon of 19 December. The service was attended by about 400 people, most of them members of the legal profession.

=== International ===
During the siege, a spokesman for the Canadian Minister of Foreign Affairs, John Baird, said, "We urge all Canadians in Sydney to use extra precaution and limit their movements as authorities handle this situation."

Iranian Foreign Ministry spokeswoman, Marzieh Afkham, strongly condemned the taking of hostages as "inhuman" and also stated that the Australian authorities had been repeatedly warned about Monis.

United States President Barack Obama called the Prime Minister to express his condolences on behalf of the United States. According to the White House, Obama praised the "Australian public's embrace of #illridewithyou and the Muslim leaders who have disavowed the actions of the hostage taker", and "Australia's rejection of any violence taken in the name of religion and the fear this violence seeks to stoke." The President also conveyed the United States' willingness to provide assistance in the aftermath of the situation. United States Secretary of State, John Kerry, said the United States stood ready to provide Australia with any assistance required in "determining the facts of the case, assisting the victims and holding accountable anyone and everyone responsible for this act of terror". Citing this event, the United States issued a global travel alert to its citizens, to be alert for possible terrorist attacks within public venues.

New Zealand Prime Minister John Key, Canadian Prime Minister Stephen Harper, Indian Prime Minister Narendra Modi, UK Prime Minister David Cameron, and Malaysian Prime Minister Najib Razak also expressed their concern about the incident. In addition, the Israeli embassy in Australia stated that it stood with Australia in the face of terror.

=== Charitable foundations ===
Following the two deaths during the hostage situation, the Katrina Dawson Foundation was established, with the aim of supporting educational opportunities for women. The then Governor-General Quentin Bryce was a founding member. At his parents' request, a memorial fund for Johnson was used to raise money for mental health organisation Beyond Blue. The first donation, of $51,000, came from Lindt Australia.

=== Terrorist organizations ===
Two weeks after the siege, Dabiq, a magazine published by the ISIL editorialised on Monis' actions and attempted to claim him as one of their own, in a response that an expert described as "absolutely predictable". The magazine lauded Monis' actions and their effect on the city. The al Qaeda-produced magazine Inspire also praised Monis' actions.

== Investigations ==
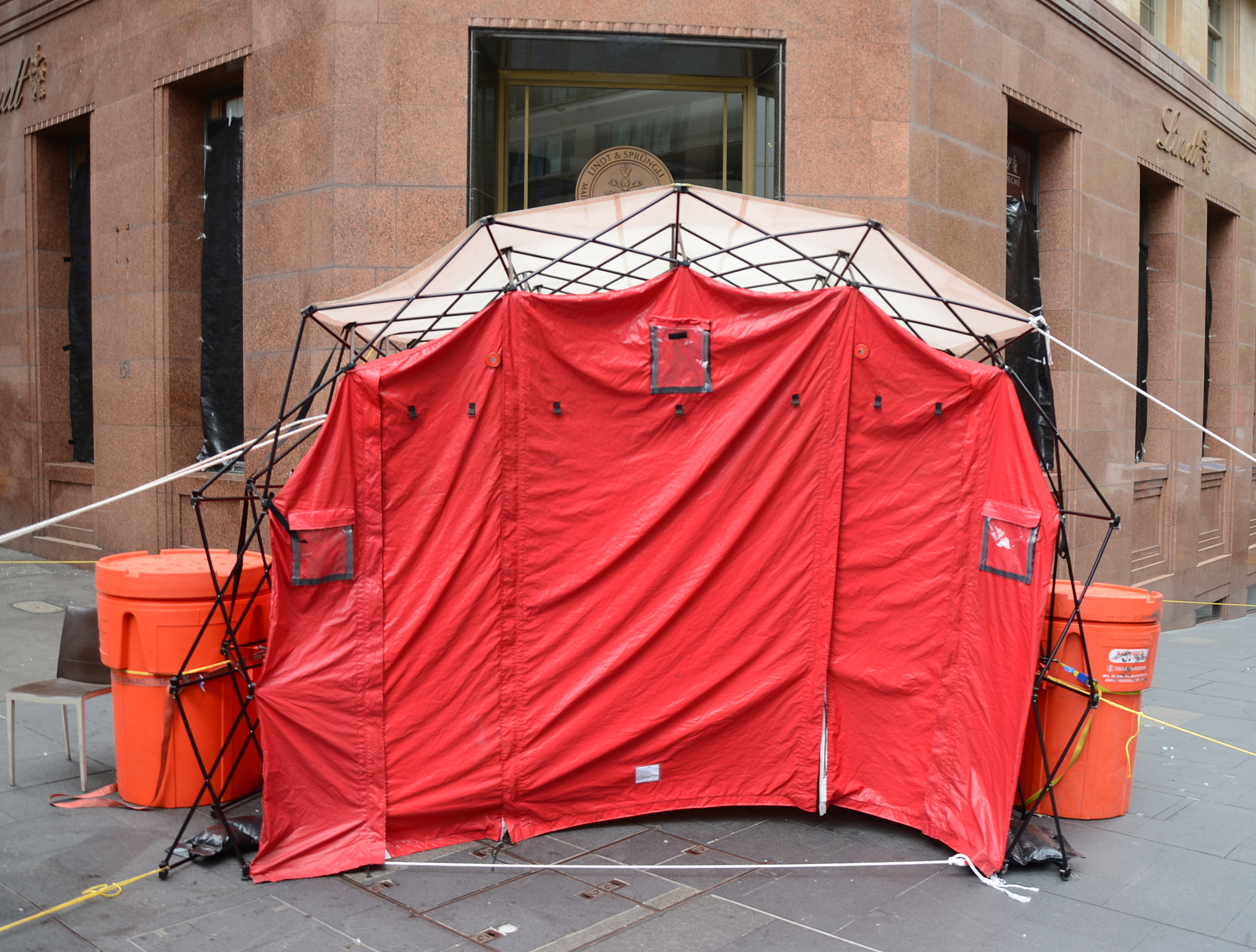
The crime scene two days after the siege

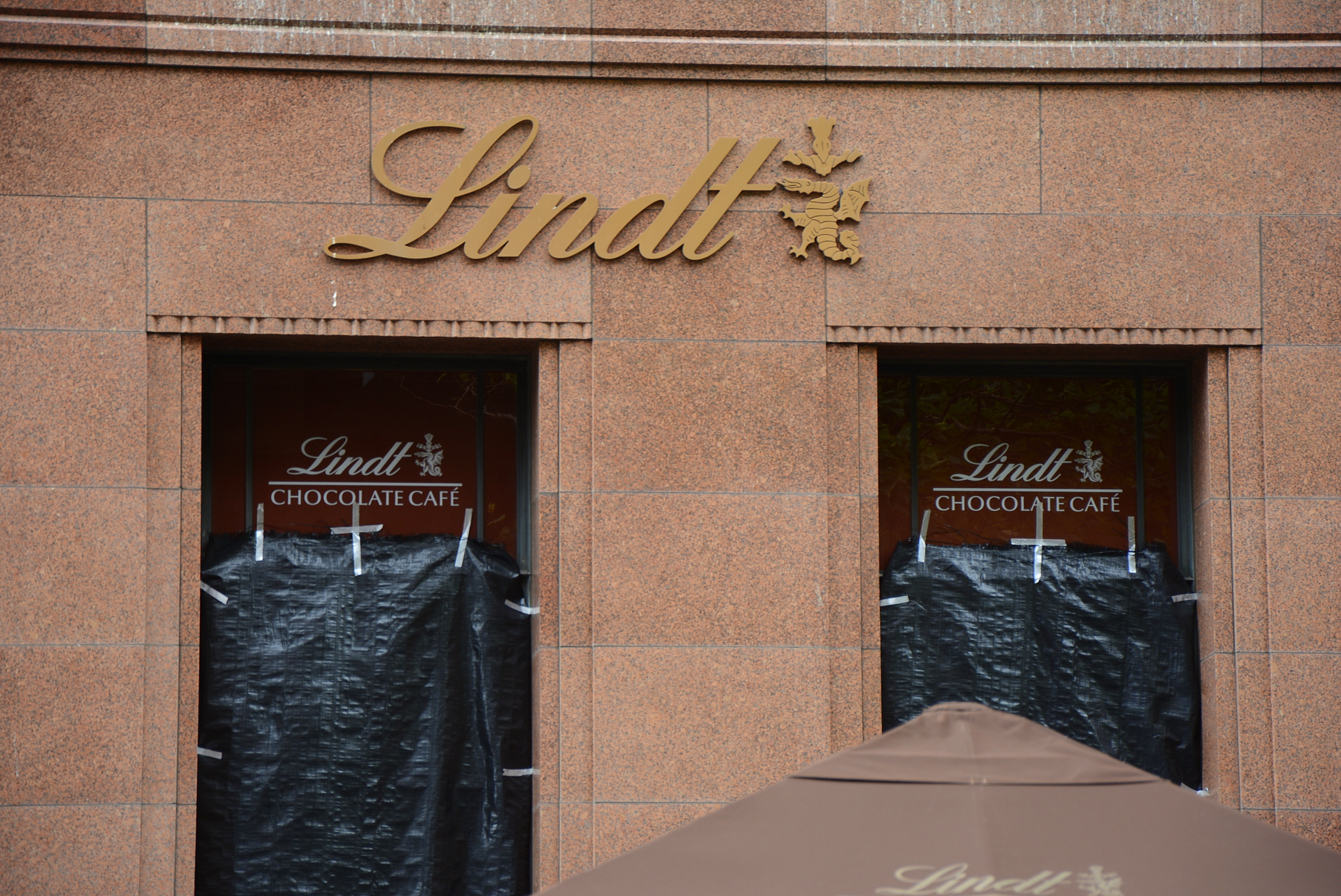
The Lindt café two days after with padding on the shattered windows

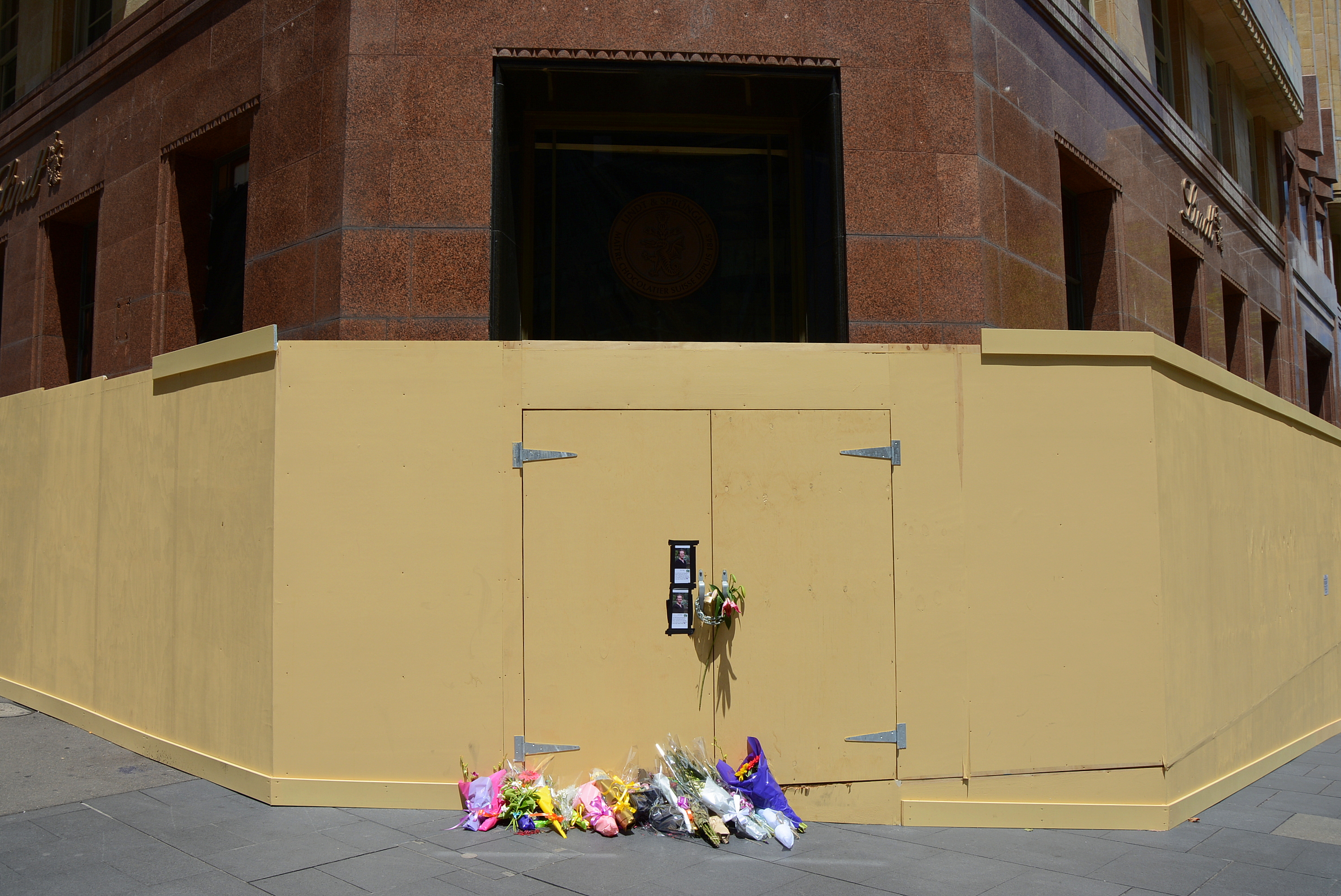
The café with a memorial to the victims on 7 January

A number of organisations announced formal investigations.

Police investigations include a "critical incident" investigation undertaken by NSW police, headed by Detective Inspector Angelo Memmolo and an enquiry conducted by the Australian Federal Police.

Federal and state governments announced a joint review to be led by Michael Thawley from the Department of the Prime Minister and Cabinet and Blair Comley of the New South Wales Department of Premier and Cabinet.

Following the siege, officers from the New South Wales Police Force and the Australian Federal Police went to the Belmore home of Monis' partner Amirah Droudis, and removed property. Her bail was revoked after a hearing on 22 December 2014. Investigations by Australian security agencies and monitoring of suspects following the siege revealed increased "terror chatter".

=== Federal–State joint review ===
The findings of the Federal–State joint review were released on 22 February 2015. The report covered Monis' earlier interactions with the government, his access to firearms, and the government response to Monis including problems correlating his various aliases. The report's terms of reference did not cover the controversial police actions during the siege itself, such as the nature of the negotiations or the final assault.

The review found that the judgements made by government agencies were reasonable. It suggested only modest changes to laws and procedures, taking the view that "introducing substantial further controls involves a larger choice about the sort of society we wish to live in and is properly the province of the public and our elected representatives". The review found that the Australian Security Intelligence Organisation (ASIO) had conducted a thorough review of Monis in 2008/9 and found that he was not involved in politically motivated violence, nor had significant contact with groups of security concern. After receiving 18 calls from the public, ASIO reviewed Monis' Facebook page, which was considered not to indicate a threat. None of the calls related to any pending attack. The review found that there was no credible information that would indicate an attack. Monis had been granted bail while charged with several violent offences. However, bail laws had since been tightened in this regard. Monis obtained his firearm illegally and was never granted a license.

The review suggested, in addition to the reforms to the bail laws and "new programmes to counter violent extremism", that a review of immigration policies and visa applications should be undertaken. The review suggested that the gun that Monis used had lawfully entered the country, possibly as early as the 1950s, and had fallen into the "grey market" after not being included in the gun buyback schemes of 1996 and 2002.

=== Inquest ===
An inquest began as scheduled on 29 January 2015, presided over by the State Coroner, Michael Barnes. A Coronial Inquest is mandatory whenever people die in a police operation. The stated aim was "to determine how the [three] deaths occurred, the factors that contributed to them and whether they could have been prevented".

The hearings were divided into blocks of a couple of weeks. The first, which started on 25 May 2015, queried people who knew Monis to get background information. The second started on 17 August 2015 to consider Monis' bail application. Further blocks that investigate how the police dealt with the siege itself were withheld from the public "in the interests of the families".

The findings of the inquest were released on 24 May 2017.

== Aftermath ==
=== Designation of the event as terrorism ===
==== Insurance declaration ====
Treasurer Joe Hockey declared the siege to be a "terrorist incident" under the Terrorism Insurance Act 2003. The Act means that insurance exclusions for terrorist incidents do not apply if such a declaration is made.

==== Debate on status as a terrorist event ====
Scholars and social commentators have debated whether Monis was a terrorist and whether his actions could be classified as an act of terrorism. There is doubt as to whether or not Monis fit the definition of a lone wolf terrorist.

Queensland University of Technology criminologist Mark Lauchs said it was important to not describe the siege as a "terrorist attack". Lauchs said Monis was simply a deranged person running a hostage situation. "This incident was not about religion and neither was it a terrorist attack, but given that perception by the paraphernalia Monis used." The Australian prime minister said, "[Man Haron Monis] had a long history of violent crime, infatuation with extremism and mental instability...As the siege unfolded yesterday, he sought to cloak his actions with the symbolism of the ISIL death cult."

Prof Greg Barton (from Deakin University) and Dr Clarke Jones (ANU) told the inquest that Monis was a loner and had mental health problems, and was desperate to attach himself to something. Clarke suggested that if the Rebels had accepted his membership then the siege might not have happened. Roger Shanahan from the Lowy Institute said that if Monis had followed ISIS direction he would have just killed everyone.

The chief of ASIO Duncan Lewis confirmed that he believed Monis to be a terrorist. However, former counter-terrorism adviser to the White House, Richard A. Clarke, said, "I don't think this was a lone wolf terrorist, I don't think this was a terrorist at all, I think this was someone who was committing suicide by police as a lot of people with mental problems do, and now, if they say they're a terrorist, if they say they're somehow associated with ISIS or Al Qaeda, it becomes a major event that shuts down the city and gets international attention. This was a person with a mental problem who tried to gain attention and succeeded, tried to shut down the city and succeeded, merely by putting up a flag that was something like the flag of ISIS."

The difference between terrorism and terrorising acts was noted in one analysis as "enormously important"—it added that in Monis' case, terrorism "was clearly an element, but he was coming to the end of his rope with a variety of legal processes; there was clearly some mental instability." One view was that his lack of ties to any movement did not preclude his being a terrorist as it is "an inclusive club". Another commentator said, "There can be also no doubt that his attack was a terrorist act, as defined under Australia's Criminal Code Act 1995" and that, "he was a terrorist, clearly influenced by IS".

One terrorism expert, Professor Greg Barton, described Monis' actions as those of a "lone wolf terrorist ... driven by a desire for attention and to be in the spotlight", and his use of the flag was described as "the only way" to instil fear on a global scale. Professor Michael Wesley, Director of the School of International, Political and Strategic Studies at the Australian National University said the attack "was very different from first-generation or second-generation terrorist attacks—but it was terrorism, and terrorism of a brutal and more unpredictable sort." Another view was that describing the gunman as a terrorist was misplaced and would only serve the interests of ISIL. The supervisor of terrorism and security analysis for Stratfor said that this hostage-incident exhibits many of the elements associated with grassroots terrorism. A criminologist said that the event "was not about religion and neither was it a terrorist attack but given that perception by the paraphernalia Monis used."

Conversely, Yassir Morsi, a researcher at the Centre for Muslim and non-Muslim Understanding in Australia, suggested that "before he flew the black flag, Monis was just a desperate man with a violent past" and that "he was just another gunman. ... the symbol (flag) rewrote Monis' violent past and gave grammar to his attack."

Monis had entered the café without an ISIS flag. ASIO's previous investigations had found no links between Monis and any terrorist group. When a news reporter met him before the crisis she thought Monis was "lost and confused" and "harmless". Habib said Monis was "sick and disturbed" and desperately seeking attention over his grievances with government officials that had nothing to do with terrorism.

In 2016, Monis was cited as one of a number of recent violent attackers who were mentally disturbed and operated under the justification of Islamist ideas or slogans. Other examples include the as-of-yet unidentified perpetrator of the Munich knife attack and Michael Zehaf-Bibeau, the perpetrator of the 2014 shootings at Parliament Hill, Ottawa. According to psychologists and psychiatrists who study radicalisation, jihad propaganda and calls to kill infidels can push mentally-ill individuals to act, even in the absence of direct or personal contact with radical Islamists.

In February 2017, United States President Donald Trump cited the Sydney siege as an example of what he claimed was deliberate underreporting of terrorist attacks by the media, notwithstanding that the event received "blanket coverage" in local and international news.

==== The coroner's finding ====
Following the Sydney siege inquest, in May 2017, the NSW Coroner Michael Barnes determined that "The siege was a terrorist incident."

=== Police weapons and tactics ===
During the siege, an Australian Army Tactical Assault Group East team at Holsworthy Barracks evaluated the floorplan of the café and gave advice to police. Mitchell McAlister, a former member of TAG East, questioned the police use of M4A1 carbines with 5.56 mm rounds over using Heckler & Koch MP5 submachine guns.

Katrina Dawson died from a fragment of a police bullet, and other hostages appear to have been hit by bullets that ricocheted off the concrete building. It was unclear why 22 shots were fired by police, of which 13 hit Monis. Police have been criticised for both the high powered weapons used and the number of shots fired.

==== Negotiation ====
During the siege, no significant effort was made to negotiate with Monis, as would normally be expected in a hostage situation in order to build a relationship with a gunman and persuade them to surrender. Instead, Monis received no encouragement or assistance from trained police negotiators.

Help was offered by the Muslim community including the Grand Mufti and Mamdouh Habib who had known Monis personally. Habib offered to help negotiate or provide background information to the police. These offers were not taken up.

It has been suggested that the police treatment of the siege as a terrorist attack may have led to errors such as making no attempt to negotiate with the gunman as would have been normal practice in other hostage situations. One commentator, Guy Rundle, questioned whether the police may have used a "crude rule" that "we don't negotiate with terrorists" that affected their procedures. It might also explain the choice of weapon in a small enclosure against a lone gunman. These factors may have directly led to the deaths of Johnson and Dawson.

==== ISIL flag ====
During the siege, police asked Muslims in Sydney to source an ISIL flag for Monis, before obtaining their own. The police later raided several houses of people contacted by Rebecca Kay, who was attempting to find an ISIL flag. Kay assumed that the phone calls had been monitored, and that the request had been solely to find out who she would contact, lowering trust in the NSW Police Force among Muslims.

=== Lack of detection ===
The security services have been criticised for not recognising that Monis was a threat, and for taking him off their watch list in 2008. This may have been because they overlooked key evidence, or it may have been because there was simply no evidence to collect. The federal-state joint review found that the relevant agencies' analysis had been reasonable.

=== Law and politics ===
After the siege, the revelation that the new Bail Act had allowed Monis to be granted bail sparked calls to further tighten the law; however, a review had already been conducted in the wake of earlier controversial bail releases, with the new law set "to take effect next year" (that is, on 28 January 2015). Former director of public prosecutions in New South Wales, Nicholas Cowdery, said he was not sure that the amended law would have changed anything in Monis' case, saying that "There will always be, unfortunately, some exceptional events which laws and controls put in place before the event could not have prevented". Homicide detectives sent a letter to the Director of Public Prosecutions (DPP) urging them to challenge the bail decision for Monis, but a commissioned officer did not pass it on to the DPP. Michael Esposito, writing for the Law Society of South Australia, noted that the shocking nature of the Sydney siege had the power to prompt reviews of bail laws across Australia.

Some commentators expressed concerns about immigration and citizenship processes. Monis' "confused agenda" meant that Amnesty International did not realise that he and Boroujerdim, who had sought help in 1997, were the same man until they went back through their records. In the absence of hard evidence, suggestions that Monis represented a growing trend of systemic failure, rather than being an aberration, were noted as dangerous to public confidence; to the separation of powers; to the idea of innocence till proven guilty and also to social cohesion by inviting suspicion of people from the Middle East.

In the week after the siege, it was revealed that John Robertson, NSW Opposition leader, had sent a letter which passed on a request made by Monis, a constituent in his Blacktown electorate, to the Department of Family and Community Services in 2011. The letter was, according to Robertson, routine procedure on behalf of a constituent and written in support of Monis' request for a supervised visit with his children on Father's Day despite an apprehended violence order against him. The Department declined Monis' request. As pressure mounted on Robertson to resign as Leader of the Labor Party, and three months away from the 2015 state election, he stood aside on 23 December 2014.

=== Violence ===
Commentators considered Monis' history of domestic violence, with a family violence expert arguing that it should have been considered when bail was given. A columnist noted that while his behaviour highlighted an "epidemic" of violence towards women, the media focus remained on terrorism.

Historians of religion and politics also critically reviewed the role of violence committed in the name of religion.

=== Media ===
Debate followed about the difficulty of managing a police operation in the presence of continuous global media coverage as well as the likely damage caused by the spread of rumour. Particular criticism was levelled at Rupert Murdoch and News Corp Australia for spreading false information as well as for insensitivity and "gross ethical violations". Commissioner Scipione and chair of the Australian Press Council, Professor Julian Disney released statements about the media coverage after the event. Beyond misinformation, concerns were raised regarding the presentation of crises as entertainment.

Australian Broadcasting Corporation's Four Corners aired a two-part broadcast, interviewing former hostages, and the families of deceased hostages Katrina Dawson and Tori Johnson.

Journalist Deborah Snow wrote an account of the siege, published in 2018, covering the personal and organisational issues.

== Memorials and legacy ==
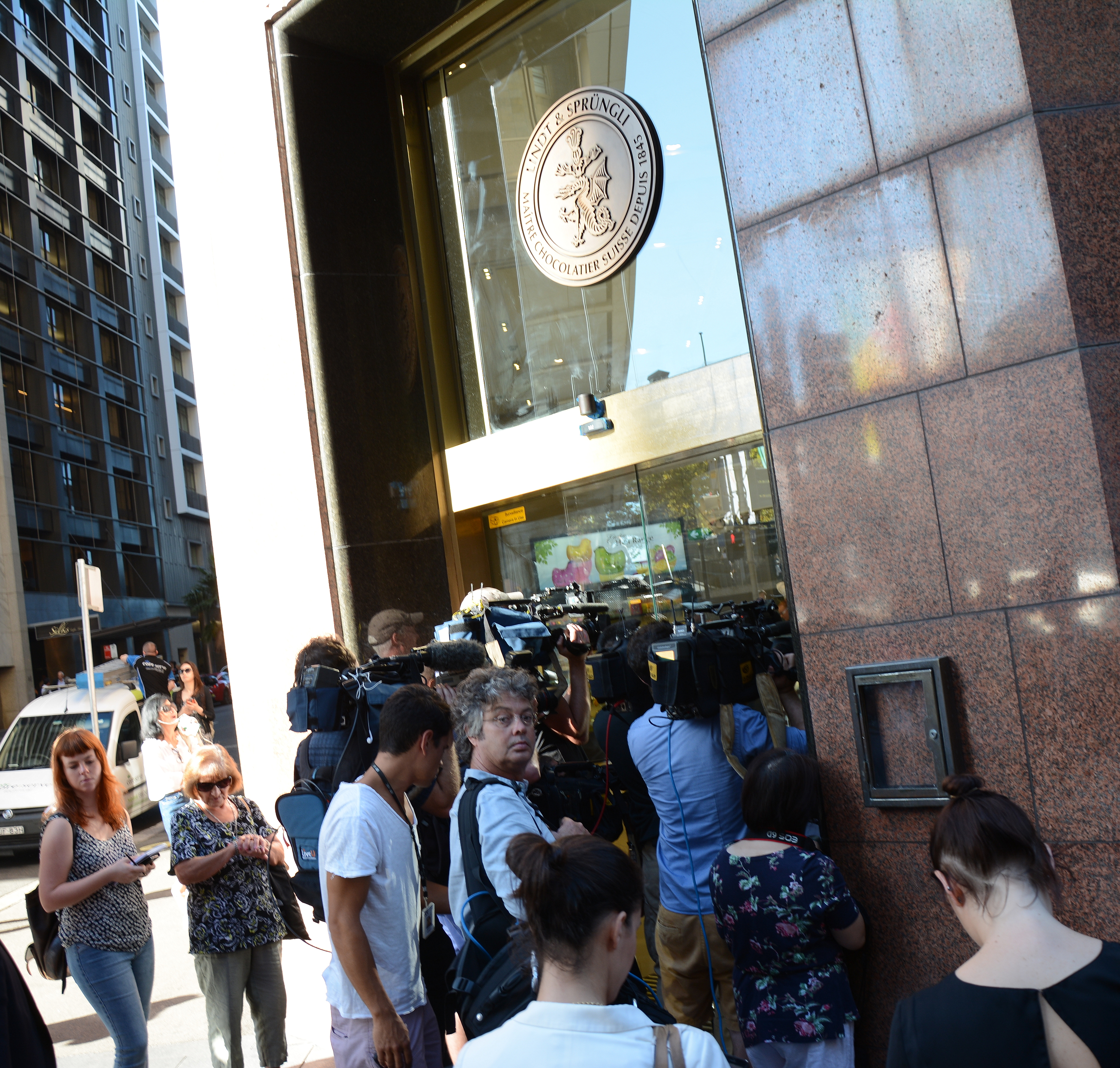
Café reopening approximately three months later, March 2015

A month after the siege, police, ambulance workers, firefighters and others were officially thanked at NSW Government House. Memorial plaques were placed inside the reopened Lindt café. A permanent memorial to the victims of the siege incorporated the flowers from Martin Place, which were to be mulched and incorporated into its garden element. The memorial was opened in December 2017.

The premiere of Jonathon Welch's choral piece Street Requiem in February 2015 was dedicated to the siege victims and to those who died in the Charlie Hebdo shooting in Paris.

Composer Lyle Chan, who resides less than a kilometre from the Lindt Café, wrote two works influenced by the events. Sea of Flowers was premiered by conductor Alondra de la Parra and the Queensland Symphony Orchestra in May 2015. Chan's Love Is Always Born (December), with original words by Michael Leunig and 'Silent Night' in Arabic, was commissioned and premiered by the Song Company at concerts around the first anniversary of the events.

Dawson's family created the Katrina Dawson Foundation and scholarships to The Women's College, University of Sydney to sponsor and mentor young women of great potential, and to provide financial assistance to them for their university education. The first recipients started university in 2016. Katrina Dawson achieved a perfect Tertiary Entrance Rank of 100 in the year 1994. Twenty-seven scholarships had been awarded by 2025. The inaugural Katrina Dawson John Monash scholarship - for post graduate study - was awarded in 2025 to Adele Burke, who planned to use the support offered by the two foundations to study at Oxford University.

Senator Dean Smith, a homosexual Liberal Party member, changed his views on same-sex marriage in Australia due to Tori Johnson and his partner of 14 years. Smith later introduced a bill aimed at legalising same-sex marriage to the Senate, which became law.

A ceremony unveiling the memorial was held on 16 December 2017.

The Lindt Café closed in October 2021 due to lack of patronage caused by the COVID-19 pandemic and ongoing construction work for the Sydney Metro. A Dan Murphy's wine cellar opened at the site of the café in July 2023.

As part of the 2024 March Bravery Honours, 32 members of the New South Wales Police Force and New South Wales Ambulance service were awarded the Group Bravery Citation.

== See also ==
- List of mass shootings in Australia
- 2015 Parramatta shooting
- Crime in Australia
- Islam in Australia
