= Sydney siege inquest =

Inquest into deaths that occurred during the 2014 Sydney hostage crisis

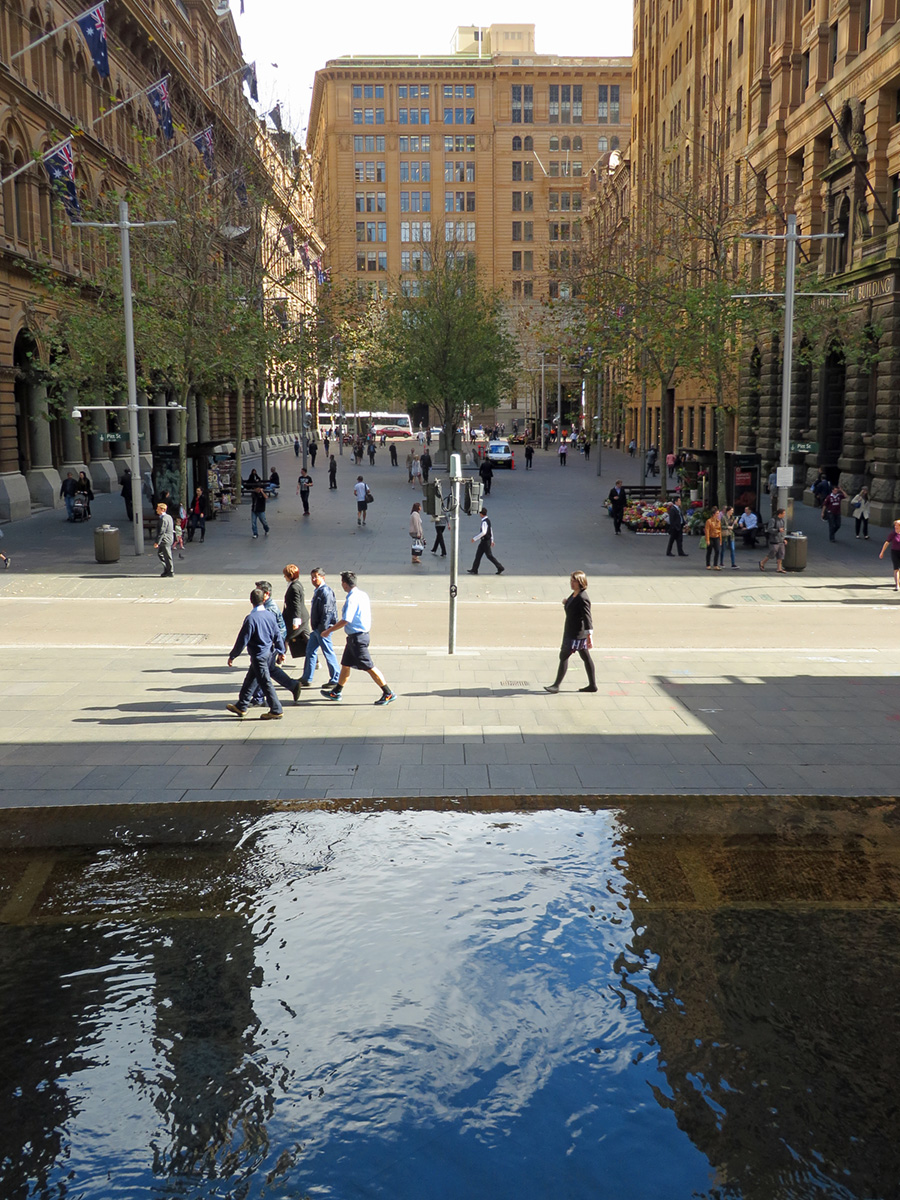
Martin Place, the location of the siege, pictured in 2013

The Sydney siege inquest was an inquest into the deaths that occurred during the Lindt Cafe siege, which was instigated by Man Haron Monis. The inquest started on 29 January 2015, had more than 100 witnesses and was run in blocks into 2016.

In Australia, an inquest is mandatory whenever a person dies during a police operation. The inquest was presided over by the New South Wales State Coroner, Michael Barnes, and its task was "to determine how the [three] deaths occurred, the factors that contributed to them and whether they could have been prevented".

Two unusual features of the inquest were its detailed opening which provided an account of events in order to dispel speculation and its focus on social media, believed to be merited by police because of its significant role.

The hearings were divided into blocks of a couple of weeks. The first, started on 25 May 2015, queried people who had known Monis in order to get background information. The second started on 17 August 2015 and considered Monis's bail application. Further blocks that investigate how the police dealt with the siege itself were withheld from the public "in the interests of the families".

On 20 May, the Crown Prosecutor wrote a letter arguing that the question of Monis' bail was beyond the scope of the inquest. This was ruled on by Coroner Barnes on 5 June. Five documents relating to Monis' bail were kept secret on the grounds of professional legal privilege.

The findings of the inquest were released on 24 May 2017.

== First two-week block: people who knew Monis ==
The first two-week block started on 25 May 2015, taking evidence from people who knew Monis. Coroner Barnes said that a central question is, "Was Monis a so-called lone wolf prosecuting an ISIS-style terror attack, or a deranged individual pursuing a personal private grievance in a public manner?"

=== 29 March 2015 ===
Hostage Jarrod Morton-Hoffman told police that a woman would be shot if they did not move cars visible from the window. (It is unclear whether the cars were moved.) Morton-Hoffman helped calm down an increasingly agitated Monis multiple times throughout the 17-hour ordeal.

=== 31 March 2015 ===
Hostage Ms Ma said that Man Haron Monis was becoming increasingly agitated as the siege entered the early hours of the morning.

=== 25 May 2015 ===
On 25 May, a summary of Monis' life in Australia was presented, depicting him as a "complex and secretive" man. This included his request for asylum, and his being accused of sexual offenses against women. He had been diagnosed with depression and schizophrenia at different times. He also joined the Rebels Motorcycle Club but was not liked and was rejected as a member in mid 2013. By 2014, Monis was "a man who was spiralling out of control", with few friends and no standing with any community.

The inquest heard from Hassan Zoabi who had employed Monis in 1997 as a security guard and said his manners were "impeccable". A solicitor for Monis, Franklin Arguedas, said that Monis avoided giving identification or an address. In 2005, Arguedas had confronted customs about Monis' claims that he was being "picked on". Arguedas thought Monis "wanted to be treated like the prime minister", and so suggested that Monis seek [psychological] therapy. Customs director John Valastro noted that Monis' "threshold for questions was quite low. Any time a customs officer asked a personal question it would seem to generate an excessive response." Catherine Wood of Amnesty International then testified that after interviewing Monis in 2010, "It was very much like he was standing on a soap box, he was painting himself as a noble victim ... it was a story of victimhood and persecution. It was nonstop."

=== 27 May 2015 ===
On 27 May, community corrections officer Margaret Kedzierska said Monis finished his service "mostly satisfactorily", although he complained about being victimised by an officer at the Police Citizens Youth Club. Monis was treated by psychiatrist Kristen Barrett in 2010 and 2011 for mild chronic schizophrenia. He was initially quite paranoid about ASIO and "groups from Iran", but was not threatening or intimidating. Monis improved by July 2010, and undertook an unarmed security guard course in 2012. He was considered to be a "show off". Psychiatrist Daniel Murray treated Monis for panic disorder and depression in 2010, but did not know that Monis was also seeing Barrett.

=== 28 May 2015 ===
On 28 May, several psychiatric professionals said that they interviewed Monis on various occasions in 2010 and 2014. They considered him paranoid, anxious, and self-obsessed, but harmless. He could seem somewhat delusional and intimidating, but at other times cooperative and logical.

Senior constable Murray Northey then testified that he had spent several months examining Monis's digital trail but found no evidence of contact with ISIS. Monis had a Twitter account but only twelve followers, although after the siege, he had 898. Monis's daughter in Iran married a man that wanted to come to Australia so she could be with Monis.

=== 29 May 2015 ===
On 29 May, lawyer Nazir Daawar said that he found Monis "a smart guy, but a very evil smart guy". Daawar refused to represent Monis over the Afghan letters and went so far as to say "he would have urged police to shoot him with 'no negotiation'". Dawaar had served in Afghanistan and demanded that Monis plead guilty over the letters he had written to families of soldiers that were killed there. Conversely, lawyer Chris Murphy told the court he thought Monis was "not very intelligent" and a "broken man" who "cried like a baby" when recounting alleged mistreatment in Silverwater jail. All of the lawyers spoke of Monis' attention-seeking behaviour.

At the end of the first week, a picture has emerged of "a complex, disturbed individual desperate for recognition and status but completely lacking the skills or achievements to bring that dream to life". Gormly summarised that "Monis could be plausible, courteous and controlled, but he was also almost entirely consumed in his own self-importance. ... By 2014 he owned no property, was in debt, and had developed no employment skills. His attempts to develop a personal, religious following ... had failed. ... He was facing future serious criminal charges... he had made no public impact of note on the Australian political scene". Monis may have felt that he had "little left to live for".

=== 1 June 2015 ===
On 1 June, family law solicitor Olivia Wilkins said that in 2011 she found Monis passive, paranoid, and difficult. Court social worker Sylvia Martin also noted that Monis wore a strange suit in court, describing it as a "cream coloured suit with vertical black stripes". She thought Monis needed to be "[a] hero in his own story."

When Monis married Noleen Pal in 2002, he had been "quite westernised", but around 2007, he became more strict, demanding that she wear a veil and imposing corporal punishment on their children. He also spent some time away from home. Pal said Monis had wanted to be a martyr for Islam, and she did not want this to influence her children. Monis denied this, and Martin did not think Monis wanted to be a martyr, but was instead seeking for attention.

Solicitor David Cohen said Monis was polite, moderately intelligent, researched things, and opinionated.

Monis' final lawyer John Miller said that Monis had become religious, writing "in the name of God" on top of his affidavit.

=== 2 June 2015 ===
On 2 June, David Richardson of Channel 7 described his coverage of Monis in 2010. Channel Seven security coordinator Scott McIlveena said he met Monis protesting about the way Muhamed Haneef had been covered. Monis rushed at Sunrise hosts in Martin Place calling them "killers and terrorists" but kept his distance when asked.

Associate Ahmad Alaei said that Monis proposed dubious business deals and then wanted to work for Alaei. Alaei let Monis stay in a house that he owned.

Monis courted Amanda Morsy in 2003 who noted Monis drank some alcohol. She found Monis generous but secretive, also saying he was "just reserved. He just wanted to fit in to any group."

=== 3 June 2015 ===
On 3 June, flatmate Amin Khademi said that Monis had been difficult to live with, and that Khademi had tried to persuade Monis not to send letters to the families of killed servicemen. Four other witnesses including Monis's girl friend's cousin confirmed Monis' polite but secretive nature as well as his grandstanding.

== Second block: bail ==
The second block began hearing evidence on 17 August 2015. It focused on why Monis was granted bail before the siege, his previous bail history, whether prosecuting authorities responded appropriately to his applications for bail, and whether procedures should be changed. However, Coroner Barnes said that it was unfair to blame the bail process for the siege because no one could have been expected to foresee the events that followed.

The director of public prosecutions wanted to keep documents relating to the application secret, but Coroner Barnes) has released some documents.

=== 17 August 2015 ===
Counsel assisting the inquiry, Jeremy Gormly SC, said, "The bail story of Mr Monis is long and complex." Gormly noted that some system of granting bail is needed to distinguish between accusing someone of an offense and conducting a fair trial, and that a system of bail is found in all advanced countries and reflects the rule of law. Under the new act, the granting of bail was on the basis of risk assessment that an accused would fail to appear, commit another offence, or interfere with a witness or evidence.

Monis's first bail was for sending letters to families of dead servicemen. His second bail was on the charge of being an accessory to the murder of his wife. His third bail was for sexual assaults (not rape) that were only prosecuted years after the events. In each case, Monis appeared to fully comply with all bail conditions. A panel of bail experts told the inquest that bail was appropriately given, although prosecutors had not known of Monis's independent offenses. Detective senior constable Denise Vavayis had concerns that Monis might harass the sexual assault complainants, but Monis did not do so.

The inquest considered whether the siege was an act of terrorism. Junior counsel Sophie Callan said that Monis made no attempt to contact ISIS. Rodger Shanahan from the Lowy Institute considered Monis to be mentally disturbed rather than a terrorist, citing the lack of communication with ISIS, the absence of an ISIS flag, and a Shia headband (ISIS opposes Shia). Bruce Hoffman from the Georgetown University disagrees, considering the strategic location opposite Channel Seven. A psychologist thought the siege was not reflective of an ISIS attack, noting that Monis apologised to his victims.

Monis acquired the shotgun fairly recently, as searches had been performed on his premises from 2009 to 2013. It was a grey market farm gun rather than a black market gun, but it should have been surrendered in 1996 or 1998. It had been sawn off for more efficient concealment.

It was noted that the DPP officer who approved Monis' bail was inexperienced.

=== 18 August 2015 ===
Detective Eugene Stek criticised the simplified Bail Act 2013, which had a single test: asking if the accused posed an unacceptable risk, and then whether conditions could mitigate that risk. Stek accused Monis of being an instigator of the Lakemba protests after counter-terrorism police raided several roads, but upon questioning by Gormly admitted that there was no evidence for this.

Monis's compliance with the terms of his bail made it difficult to refuse him further bail, but the police never connected the various offenses that he was accused of, none of which were related to terrorism.

=== 19 August 2015 ===
Only details about the bail were covered, including that ASIO officers apparently attended the hearings without knowledge of the police. Melanie Staples from the homicide squad said the court should not have granted bail for the murder charge because the DPP did not present evidence of a discredited alibi. However, she then conceded that the bail submissions had actually been "very good" upon cross examination by Gormly. Staples had known that Monis was on bail when charged with further offenses, but this was never presented to court for unknown reasons.

When Monis was charged as being an accessory to murder, the prosecuting solicitor failed to give the court a letter written by police, which stated that Monis was regarded as a risk to witnesses and the broader community, and that he would have to meet "exceptional circumstances" to be granted bail. The letter also stated that, at the time of the murder accessory charge, Monis was on bail for sending offensive letters to the families of soldiers.

=== 20 August 2015 ===
Gormly wanted to release documents that the DPP wanted withheld. The coroner ruled that some but not all documents were released. Staples said that a report she had written was never received by the DPP, but she added that the DPP solicitor handling the bail application was terrible, but changed her opinion to adequate after rereading the transcript. Staples also provided background information during the siege. Much of the days' evidence was suppressed from publication.

=== 21 August 2015 ===
The unnamed DPP solicitor that handled the bail application said that he had not received the letter written by Staples, although he never asked the police for bail information. The DPP solicitor only provided oral arguments in response to Monis's solicitor's detailed 30-page submission. He said that he had thrown out notes about his conversation with Staples and the police statement of facts a month before the siege.

=== 24 August 2015 ===
The solicitor admitted that he could have missed evidence that Monis was on bail, and maintains that he had never seen the letter before. He failed to view a key piece of evidence that Monis' lawyer used to underpin his bail application. The lawyer of Tori Johnson's family accused the DPP solicitor of not understanding the law, assuming that being an accessory to murder did not carry a presumption against bail, citing case law to support this. Associate Professor Mohamad Abdalla of Griffith University gave evidence about Monis' conversion from Shia to Sunni. Monis rarely attended mosques and did not participate within local Muslim communities.

=== 25 August 2015 ===
Bruce Hoffman, a US terrorism expert, gave supporting evidence that Monis' actions were inspired by ISIS, that the siege was an act of terrorism, and that his mental health issues did not change this. Hoffman gave Theodore Kaczynski as another example of a terrorist who was radicalised despite significant mental health issues. It was heard that ASIO considered Monis a "serial pest", as he had given them several false tip-offs in the past. Kate Barelle, a forensic psychologist, regarded Monis as atypical for a radicalised person, saying that he acted like "someone who had backed himself into a corner" during the siege.

News organisations have applied to the coroner to release the names of the two unnamed DPP officers who handled Monis' bail in December 2013 and October 2014.

=== 26 August 2015 ===
Prof Greg Barton and Dr Clarke Jones said that it would have been extremely difficult to predict that Monis would undertake the siege as he was a loner, had mental health problems, and was desperate to attach himself to something. Clarke suggested that if the Rebels had accepted his membership, then the siege might not have happened. Roger Shanahan from the Lowy institute said that if Monis had followed the direction of ISIS, he would have just killed all of the hostages. The Coroner ruled that the names of the DPP solicitors should remain suppressed. Lawyer 2, who represented the DPP against Monis in October 2014, had had no formal training in the NSW bail law.

=== 28 August 2015 ===
On 10 October 2014, detectives laid 27 new charges of sexual assault against Monis. The DPP solicitor said he did not oppose bail because Monis had not breached any of his bail conditions set down for previous charges. He also said that there was no new evidence to support a detention application, but a homicide detective disputed that. Gormly criticised the solicitor for not bringing all of the facts to the attention of the court.

=== 31 August 2015 ===
Linda Barnes, a solicitor for the DPP who had managed Monis's case from April to August 2014, criticised police's decision to issue Monis with a Future Court Attendance Notice, saying it made it more difficult for prosecutors to argue for the refusal of bail, as the police had already effectively stated, through the issuing of a FutureCANs, that Monis was not a threat to the community.

=== 1 September 2015 ===
An expert stated that even if the DPP officer had opposed bail, Monis may still have met the "exceptional circumstances" test that would grant him bail.

=== 2 September 2015 ===
Monis's gun was a 50-year-old Manufrance LaSalle 12-gauge pump-action shotgun that had been crudely sawn off. It could hold three cartridges in the magazine and one in the barrel.

=== 3 September 2015 ===
Islamic Friendship Association founder Keysar Trad described Monis as a childlike attention seeker and said that he would have tried to negotiate with him. Trad had previously offered his assistance to police during the siege but it was not accepted.

=== 4 September 2015 ===
A witness who had been Monis's accountant in Iran during the 1990s said that he thought Monis worked for the security services. In the mid-1990s, Monis lived in an exclusive gated community. The accountant described Monis as very wealthy, saying that his wealth was created by a scam in which Monis bought discounted tyres from the government and then resold them on the black market for a profit of around AUD$25,000-30,000 each time. The inquest resumed in November.

== Third block: ASIO ==
The third block opened on 18 November and focused on ASIO's knowledge of and interactions with Monis.

=== 18 November 2015 ===
ASIO received a number of calls about the contents of Monis' Facebook page on 9 December 2014, at the time considering him a "serial pest".

=== 15 December 2015 ===
On the anniversary of the siege, State Coroner Barnes released a statement, describing the inquest as "one of the largest and most complex" undertaken in Australia, highlighting the implications for national security and for public confidence in the police.

=== Findings ===
The findings were expected to be handed down in mid-2016, however were not released until 24 May 2017.

The 2016 phase of the inquiry found that police never gained access to City of Sydney CCTV systems in Martin Place, and only gained access to the live feed from the Channel 7 building at around 8:00 pm.

In May, Assistant NSW Police Commissioner Mark Jenkins took the stand. Jenkins took command of the police operation at 10:00 pm, but was not made aware that the police had a covert listening device in the cafe before the final police entry. The listening device picked up sounds of female hostages vomiting and hyper ventilating in the cafe. Jenkins was not made aware of text messages sent by hostages indicating they believed the gunman was likely to shoot a hostage. Hostages, including Tori Johnson, who was later killed, were ordered to call their loved ones, but the police did not infer that calls indicated that the gunman intended to kill them.

== 2016 ==
=== 22 March 2016 ===
The police followed a the "contain and negotiate" strategy as "at the heart of the police response", to storm the cafe was part of an emergency action plan that would be triggered only if a hostage was killed or injured. At 8:20 and again at 11:35 pm, the head of the tactical operations unit attempted to persuade the other commanders a "deliberate action" plan.

However Police formed the "strong view" that the containment strategy could deliver a "peaceful negotiated outcome", the inquest heard. "That view was based on matters such as Monis not having harmed any hostages, despite having threatened to do so. Monis not having reacted violently despite the escape of five hostages on two separate occasions and the fact that Monis' behaviour had not escalated despite most of his demands not being met," Ms Callan said. Assistant Commissioner Mark Jenkins also heard that "if the bomb was triggered, those inside the cafe and those attempting a rescue were not likely to survive".

=== 23 March 2016 ===
Barrister Michael Klooster happened to see Monis in the cafe shortly before the siege. Klooster had represented Monis in a family court appearance. Monis wanted to discuss a possible appeal, but Klooster was committed to appear in court. Klooster said Monis appeared calm and polite.

=== 31 March 2016 ===
Army advisors were concerned that the high velocity 5.56mm bullets could fragment and kill hostages. For close range operations they would have used larger but slower 9mm bullets. They complained about a lack of cooperation from the NSW Police. The army had gained substantial experience of these types of operations in Afghanistan.

=== 18 April 2016 ===
After some hours of negotiation, police withdrew their attempt to keep their actions during the siege discussed in camera. However, issues dealing with "methodology" would be secret.

=== 19 April 2016 ===
Superintendent Allan Sicard said that he "was OK" with allowing Monis to speak on ABC radio in exchange for hostages early during the siege. It is unclear why this did not happen.

=== 26 May 2016 ===
"Reg" said that Monis had said that Monis had told people inside the cafe that everyone would go home once Prime Minister Tony Abbott called. Reg conceded that Abbott was never going to call.

=== 30 May 2016 ===
The primary police negotiator was a senior sergeant identified only as "Peter". He had never worked in a hostage situation before. He had undertaken a total of four weeks of formal training as a negotiator in 2004, 2005 and 2006, in addition to a counter-terrorism course in 2009.

All recordings of the negotiations from the beginning of the siege at 9:44 am until 1:16 pm were lost. Peter said that he was "not real good with technology".

The negotiation team leader was identified as "Reg". The team worked from a TOU four wheel drive before moving to a cramped office nearby. The special Negotiation Unit truck that they normally use was unavailable since 2011 due to storm damage.

=== 31 May 2016 ===
"Peter" said that he felt let down by police commanders because they did not pass on important information. In particular, Peter found out about Monis's demand for the ABC to broadcast that Australia was under attack only after a Facebook post from one of the hostages was read out on radio 2GB(!)

Monis had also demanded that the Christmas lights be turned off. Peter said that doing this would have provided an opportunity to bargain with Monis. However, Peter did not hear back from commanders as to whether that was possible so Peter just "discarded" the option.

Peter had not been told that the Grand Mufti of Australia and a barrister who represented Monis had offered to help negotiate with Monis. (Mamdouh Habib had also offered help.)

Peter had also did not have access to a listening device inside the cafe, although he assumed he would be told of "anything important".

Calls from hostages to the negotiators also when unanswered because they were diverted if the negotiator's line was engaged. In particular, Hostage Selina Win Pe's calls with demands from the gunman Man Haron Monis went unanswered at 12:30 am, 12:32 am and 12:37 am. There was only one mobile phone assigned to the unit but it was not used.

At 1:43 am Tori Johnson texted "He's (Monis) increasingly agitated, walks around when he hears a noise outside with a hostage in front of him. Wants to release one person in good faith, tell police.". Jenkins was unaware of the message.

Peter also agreed with expert Andrew Brown that if the hostages had been more effectively reassured then more intelligence could have been gathered.

=== 1 June 2016 ===
A second negotiator "Matt" had not even been told about Monis's demand that Christmas lights be turned off. Hostage Selina Win Pe told him they had made the request two or three hours ago and Monis wanted to know why it hadn't happened. Ms Wen Pe made a second call saying that if the lights were not turned off within 15 minutes Monis threatened to shoot her. Yet half an hour later there was still no confirmation whether the lights could go off.

=== 2 June 2016 ===
Third negotiator "Darren" said that he did not have the Christmas lights turned off because he had some reason to believe that Monis would not carry through his threat to kill Win Pe. He also said that he was unaware that the request had been made several hours earlier. Daren said there was some "step-by-step" process to have the hostages released (after nineteen hours).

Darren also thought Win Pe might be sympathising with Monis (Stockholm syndrome) after she was overheard saying that she was sorry about the way he [Monis] was being treated during the Lindt cafe siege.

Upon application from Gormly, Coroner Barnes reduced the number of remaining witnesses to be heard from 40 to 17 in order to be able to be able to release a finding more quickly. The 17 were 12 police witnesses plus 5 additional ones requested by the Johnson family. Other witnesses would provide written evidence.

It was also said that any 'police failings need to be dealt'.

=== 3 June 2016 ===
Lawyer Manny Conditsis complained that he did not think his offer to help negotiate with Monis was passed through to relevant people. Conditsis had represented Monis and said that Monis respected what he had to say to him. Conditsis talked to a "senior detective" at 5:45 pm who said that they still did not know who the gunman was. Conditsis thought that his offer of help fell on deaf ears.

=== 6 June 2016 ===
At about 11 am Operational Commander Mick Fuller approved negotiations for the release of half of the 18 hostages in return for Monis being allowed to talk on ABC radio, and to "Look for concessions/reciprocity."

However, negotiation commander detective chief inspector "Graeme" decided not to do so because it conflicted with a standing policy to not negotiate with terrorists. Grahame discussed this with Reg. Graeme thought the incident was "politically motivated violence"

=== 7 June 2016 ===
Grahame was involved by phone with four other hostage situation during the siege. He also failed to provide the inquiry notes that he took during the siege. Grahame started work at 5 am on the day of the siege, and worked through to 2 pm the following day.

=== 8 June 2016 ===
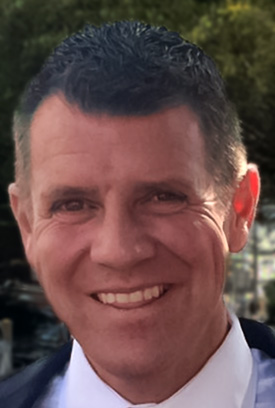
Baird in 2015

Police Commissioner Andrew Scipione and Premier Mike Baird gave a press conference during the siege at 8:15 pm without first consulting the negotiators. Graeme said he was unaware of the conference. (Gunman Monis might well have been aware of it.)

All the negotiations had in fact taken place third-hand through hostages.

Timeline of events --- moved to main inquest page.

Families have asked Deputy Commissioner Catherine Burn to be called as she was in charge of the anti-terrorism unit and the commander in charge of the siege.

Then deputy commissioner Nick Kaldas offered assistance which was declined. He had led the counter-terrorism unit before Burns and spoke fluent Arabic. He had had "a toxic, decade-long dispute with Burn".

"There should have been a strategy to engage him more forcefully, to actually meet some inane demand and use that as a foot in the door, to utilise someone with the standing of a Grand Mufti to tell him bluntly he is on the wrong track … nothing was happening. Police were always on the backfoot, and reacting, not in charge."—former police negotiator (name not provided).

=== 9 June 2016 ===
The Commander of the NSW Police Tactical Operations Unit (TOU) ("Tactical Adviser") had wanted to storm the cafe and kill Monis at 11:21 pm. However, Assistant Commissioner Mark Jenkins vetoed the plan. (Jenkins had wanted to negotiate with Monis and turn off the Christmas lights, but Graeme did not do so.)

=== 14 June 2016 ===
Unnamed psychiatrist advising the police thought Monis wanted "great infamy" rather than to hurt anyone. He believed that Monis was less dangerous that he appeared to be. He also believed that "negotiations"? had reached deadlock and nothing more would be achieved before morning. He doubted that he represented ISIS because he did not have the correct flag, nor that his actions were politically motivated. A grandiose act to be recognised as a figure of great infamy.

The psychiatrist said that ISIS had been calling for violent lone wolf attacks, but that "certainly didn't involve putting people in a stronghold and talking for hours."

Another forensic psychiatrist Dr Jonathan Phillips believed that Monis was a "Terrorist" and that negotiations would not succeed.

=== 16 June 2016 ===
Hostage Marcia Mikhael called radio 2GB during the siege and was told she would be put through to police. She said "the police is doing nothing. They've lied to the media saying they've been negotiating with (Monis) for the whole day" ... "They have not negotiated, they've done nothing. They have left us here to die. That's what the police is (sic) doing," In the last couple of hours, Monis had told his hostages not to speak to the police negotiators who called.

A psychiatrist who advised police during the siege said that hostages Mikhael and Selina Win Pe had developed a "gratuitous alliance" with the hostage taker and were beginning to exhibit signs of Stockholm syndrome. He said they were "certainly not helping" by becoming "increasingly dramatic", and that conversations picked up by a listening device in the cafe indicated things were “not as dramatic as they made out”. The psychiatrist said they were "very supportive of (Monis's) (endeavours) to procure a flag" and "… were very denigrating of police efforts." The psychiatrist also said that it was the escape of six hostages at 2:03 am on December 16 that prompted the murder of cafe manager Tori Johnson, rather than the fact that none of his demands were acceded to. The psychiatrist said that, feeling defeat and humiliation, Monis spent the next 10 minutes steeling himself to kill the cafe manager — who he saw as the authority figure.

"Darren" said that about 1:50 am one of the hostages had called the ABC (not the police) to say that pregnant lawyer Julie Taylor was about to be set free from the Lindt cafe. This was thwarted after hostages escaped, and because the media weren't broadcasting Monis's plan.

=== 20 June 2016 ===
The "NSW police tactical commander" in charge said snipers never had a clear shot at Monis, and so their use was never viable. This was due to "the narrow windows, the moving around of Monis, the risk to hostages if there was a missed shot, (and) the position of the snipers behind glass". A miss could have caused Monis to shoot hostages or detonate the bomb (if he had one).

Inspector Richard Steinborn said the M4 carbine assault rifle that fired .223 calibre pointed soft-point rounds was appropriate. He said that an alternative "bonded bullet" might have produced less fragments but had more chance of penetrating through the target and injuring others. (No mention was reported of the use of larger, slower 9mm rounds recommended by Commando Tactical Assault Group Mitchell McAlister.)

The "police commander" did not storm the building after Monis's first shot (into the air) because he thought "the terrorist" might be wanting to draw police in before detonating a bomb.

=== 23 June 2016 ===
The "Tactical Commander" believed that gunman Man Haron Monis would explode a bomb with a possible dead man's switch as police entered the Lindt Cafe. Killing the policemen as well as the hostages. No hostages reported any wires from the backpack that Monis claimed was a bomb. Although he also believed that it would have been better to storm the cafe earlier rather than waiting from Monis to act.

=== 29 June 2016 ===
Monis was hit about 13 times, with 3 in the head. The final four bullets struck Monis, his backpack and the wall of the cafe.

Four chairs were struck by 14 bullets (some of which hit Monis) and two tables were struck by two bullets.

Monis fired two shots at police 21.6 seconds after they began to enter, hitting the wall 1 and 2 metres above entering police, just before the police fired at him. Officer "A" fired 17 rounds and officer "B" fired 5 rounds. Officer B suffered minor wounds from police bullet fragments.

Siege victim Katrina Dawson suffered at least seven gunshot wounds, in the right shoulder, right upper back, left shoulder, left upper back, upper back neck area and twice in the right side of the neck. Monis fired his shotgun 4 times. Dawson was lying behind Monis, who was behind a chair. 10 bullets struck the chair, some of which probably struck Dawson. A second hostage, Louisa Hope, was very near the line of fire.

=== 14 July 2016 ===
Once Monis killed Johnson, team "Alpha" stormed the front door and "Officer A" Shot Monis in the head. "Alpha A" said "I watched the laser ... from the centre of his chest go to his head and his head exploded and he fell,". Officer A then fired a total of 17 rounds, and officer B fired 5 additional rounds. (Some of those additional rounds must have killed Dawson.)

=== 20 July 2016 ===
The TOU Forward Commander accepted responsibility for the three deaths, stating that he did not send police into the building before someone was killed due to the belief that Monis had a bomb.

=== 21 July 2016 ===
UK negotiations experts Dr Andrew Brown and Chief Superintendent Kerrin Smith said that the negotiators should have tried harder to make direct contact with Monis. Options included speakers and providing videos from families of the hostages. They should have used people with a personal or professional relationship with Monis (such as a Barrister) to try to persuade him to end the siege peacefully. Public messages by authoritative people such as Premier Mike Baird could have been used to appeal to Monis's illusions of grandeur, the experts said.

=== 26 July 2016 ===
Upon entering the cafe, "Officer A" said he had his laser sight trained on Monis' chest, before moving it up to the gunman's head and firing repeatedly. "I continued to fire at him until he went to ground and that's when I stopped firing," he said, firing a total of 17 rounds. It is unclear how long it took Monis to fall to the ground after being hit in the head nor how the officer managed to fire so many rounds in such a short period of time. Officer B, fired an additional five rounds. Some of the police rounds killed hostage Dawson.

=== 29 July 2016 ===
The UK review team gave evidence. British terrorism expert Detective Senior Constable Simon Chesterman said "The harsh reality is that lives may be lost", and that he would have "screamed" to assault the cafe before Monis shot Johnson. Armed policing expert Inspector Nigel Kefford said that the 11 stun grenades used were too many, and was disappointed that it took 12 seconds to enter the cafe. There was also a delay of several minutes on the covert listening device. They did not appear to address the issue of failed negotiations.

== 2017 ==
The Australian Federal Police had two intelligence reports about the backpack that Monis had said was a bomb, but did not share these intelligence reports with the NSW Police.

=== 24 May 2017 ===
The findings of the inquest were released on 24 May 2017. The coroner found that the police should have entered the café sooner. He found that Monis was responsible for his actions. He found that police negotiators were inadequately trained.
