= Killing of Adam Salter =

2009 police shooting in Sydney, Australia

Adam Salter was shot and killed in his Sydney home in November 2009 after police responded to a call that the 36-year-old was stabbing himself with a knife. He was shot in the back by a New South Wales Police Sergeant Sheree Bissett, who yelled "Taser, Taser, Taser" before discharging her gun. The shooter later claimed that Salter was threatening another officer with the knife and that lethal force was her only option. However, the coroner found strong evidence that the policewoman mistakenly used her gun instead of her taser.

The police actions on the day, and the critical incident investigation which followed, were sharply criticised by Scott Mitchell, the NSW deputy state coroner, at the 2011 inquest. Mental health advocate and former Australian of the Year Patrick McGorry said that Salter's case was a "failure of care". Psychiatric experts say that such tragedies will happen again without systemic change to Australia's mental health system.

"The high-ranking homicide detective, [Detective Inspector Russell Oxford], who led the investigation into the 2009 police shooting of mentally ill man Adam Salter has admitted that a report he gave to senior police soon after the incident contained false information." ... "The commission heard that, at the time of writing the report, Inspector Oxford had neither been present at any of the seven interviews police had conducted with witnesses, nor had he read any written transcripts of these interviews."

The Adam Salter shooting was the subject of an episode of the investigative journalism TV program Four Corners. In October 2014, four officers were charged for giving false evidence and have been ordered to stand trial on 26 April 2016. All four officers were acquitted of all charges in the Downing Centre District Court on June 22, 2016.

In New South Wales, other police shooting fatalities related to mentally ill people included Elijah Holcombe (shot dead in Armidale in 2009), Michael Capel (shot dead in the Belmont in 2008), and Roni Levi (shot dead on Bondi Beach in 1997). In Victoria, the fatalities included the 2008 shooting death of Tyler Cassidy.

== See also ==
- Death of Beto Laudisio
- Killing of Jesse Deacon
- Rodney Ansell
- Slips and capture, an alleged phenomenon in which a person inadvertently performs one action while intending to do another
- Shooting of Oscar Grant, which was asserted to have been intended as a taser firing
- 2015 shooting of Eric Harris, which was asserted to have been intended as a taser firing
- Killing of Daunte Wright, which was asserted to have been intended as a taser firing
