= Killing of Tyler Cassidy =

Fatal shooting of Australian teenager by police

Death of Tyler Cassidy
- Date: 11 December 2008
- Location: All Nations Park Northcote, Victoria, Australia
- Type: Death by police shooting
- Participants: Tyler Cassidy; Senior Constable Colin Dods; Senior Constable Richard Blundell; Constable Antonia Ferrante; Constable Nicole De Propertis
- Deaths: Tyler Cassidy

Tyler Jordan Cassidy was a 15-year-old Australian boy who was killed by Victoria Police officers in Australia in 2008. His death influenced changes in the way Victoria Police respond to people presenting as mentally ill and in the use of tasers.

== Shooting ==
Tyler Jordan Cassidy was shot by police and died on 11 December 2008 at All Nations Park in Northcote, Victoria. Before the shooting, Cassidy had armed himself with two large knives, which he had stolen from a nearby shopping centre and threatened members of the public, insisting that they call the police. In the park, police demanded that Cassidy drop the knives, but he did not. After attempting to subdue Cassidy twice with pepper spray, three officers fired 10 shots from their Smith & Wesson Model 10 .38 Special revolvers, with five of these striking Cassidy.

== Investigations ==
The Coroners Court of Victoria found much public commentary of the incident existed and that the death of "a 15-year-old boy at the hands of the Victoria Police both shocked and bewildered us as a community". The competence and impartiality of the internal police investigation was questioned. The coroner's inquest heard 34 days of evidence from 63 witnesses, and the brief of evidence was 3,710 pages long.

From the inquest: "He [Cassidy] had been capsicum-sprayed twice without effect and advanced on an officer who became trapped at the top of a skate park bowl, the coroner found. Three of the police fired at him after a warning shot and several shots at his legs failed to stop Tyler moving forward with the knives towards [Leading Senior Constable Colin Dods]. Tyler had been drinking excessively during the night and was found to have a post mortem blood alcohol level of between 0.09g/100ml and 0.11g/100ml." State Coroner Jennifer Coate rejected a submission from Cassidy's family that the officers used disproportionate force worthy of criminal charges, or that Cassidy had been standing still when he was fatally shot.

The incident was blamed on a lack of training and information gathering performed by Victoria Police and also blamed on the individual attempting to attack police while wielding two knives. Subsequently, all police officers who might come into contact with individuals who appear to be mentally ill in the course of duty are required to undergo a two-day training course twice a year.

== Family's appeal to the UN ==
Following the closing of the case by Australian police and determining that the officers acted within the bounds of their duty, Cassidy's mother, Shani Cassidy, appealed to the United Nations for a review of the process by which fatal police shootings are investigated by the Victoria Police Homicide Squad. The author of the UN submission, Anna Brown, expected no additional evidence regarding the investigation to be elicited. Among the complaints were allegations of poor investigative police work. Three of the four police officers involved attended a police function where alcohol was served the night before the fatal shooting occurred, but no alcohol or drug testing was administered at the time of the incident. Ten shots were fired, but no bullets were recovered from the crime scene. Dods received a private phone call from his commanding officer immediately after the event, an issue about which Dods himself was highly critical when cross-examined. Gunshot residue testing was significantly delayed, possibly leading to inconclusive results. No reconstruction was requested of the officers.

== Police integrity ==
Shani Cassidy made complaints over the integrity of Victoria Police. She alleged that her son's name was disclosed to the media, as well as a "demonising" report of the incident less than three hours after it occurred. Assistant Commissioner Cartwright, then the appointed officer for communicating with the media regarding the event, was accused of disclosing Cassidy's name by the family's counsel, but Victoria Police has strongly denied these accusations.

At one time, Shani Cassidy was recorded secretly by homicide detectives during an interview. Her appeal to the UN raised her complaint that following the incident, Victoria Police attempted to exculpate themselves.

In June 2015, The Age reported that this Wikipedia page had been edited by Victoria Police at least 17 times up until November 2014, apparently to give a more favourable impression of the officers' conduct and the subsequent investigation.

== Debate over use of tasers ==
Former chief commissioner of Victoria Police Christine Nixon has suggested that Cassidy's death prompted further community debate about the use of tasers by Victoria Police. In 2010, tasers were trialed in Bendigo and Morwell "because of the high use of OC spray, incidents involving people with a mental illness, sieges and instances where offenders have used weapons". In 2016, tasers were made more widely available to Victoria Police. Deputy Commissioner Wendy Steendam said, "What Tasers do for our members is to actually offer them another option in resolutions of incidents where they're having violent confrontations or where people are attempting to self-harm."

== Defamation case of 2016 ==
In May 2016, lawyer Michael McDonald was found to have defamed Sergeant Colin Dods and ordered to pay damages. Justice Kevin Bell described the defamatory comments, made online, as "very grave. The publication caused (Sergeant Dods) to suffer continuing intense distress, humiliation and embarrassment and thereby great harm in his reputation.".

== See also ==
- Killing of Adam Salter
- Death of Beto Laudisio
- Killing of Jesse Deacon
- Killing of Michael Capel
- Rod Ansell
- Rosie Batty
