= Crime in Australia =

- Homicide: 0.854 (2023)
- Assault: 309.8 (2023)
- Kidnapping: 1.9 (2023)
- Robbery: 36.5 (2022)
- Burglary: 577.6 (2022)
- Theft: 2027.6 (2022)
- Fraud: 32.2 (2022)
- Rape: 18.7 (2024)
- reported annually per 100,000 inhabitants

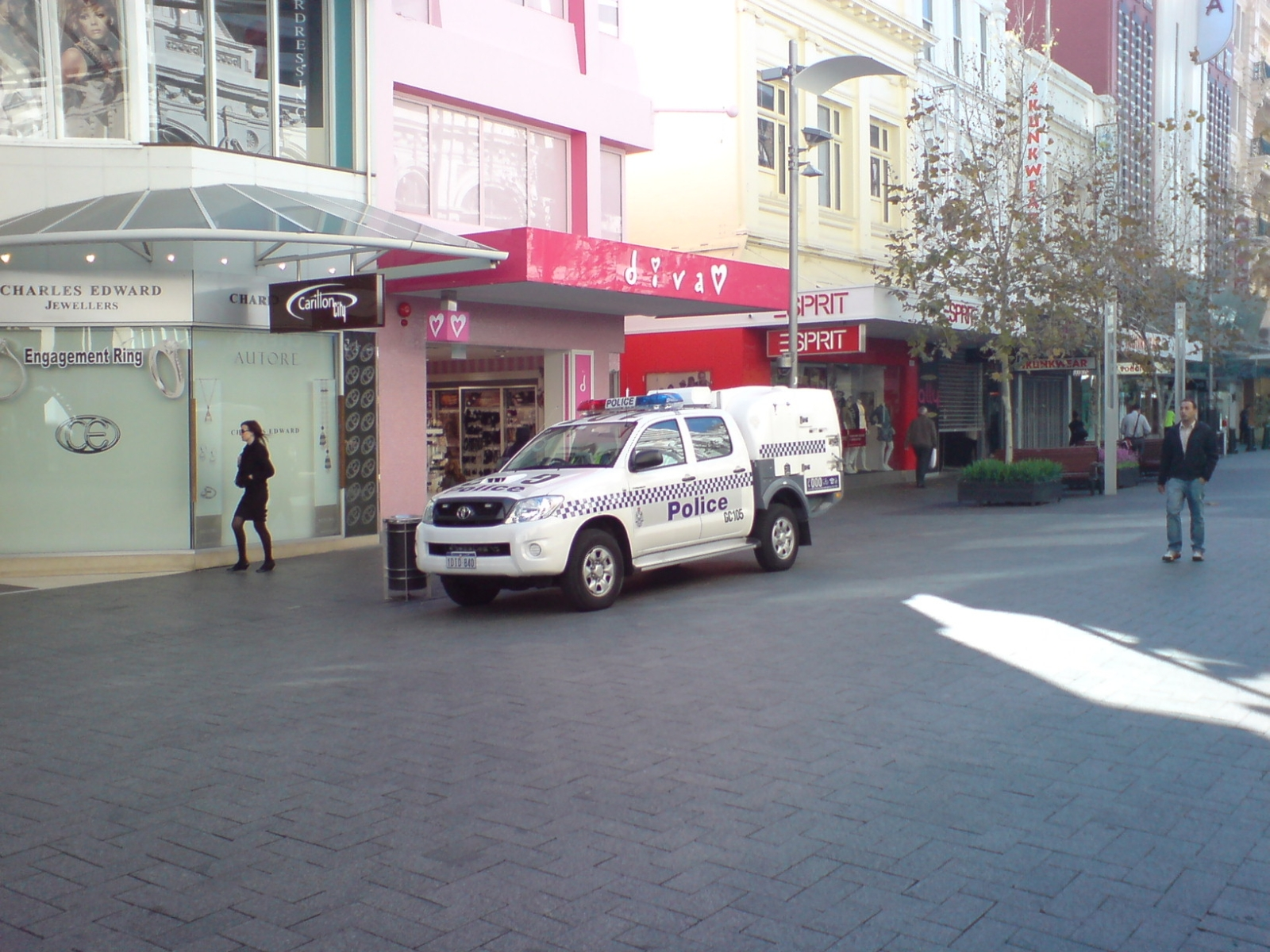
Police vehicle in the streets of Perth

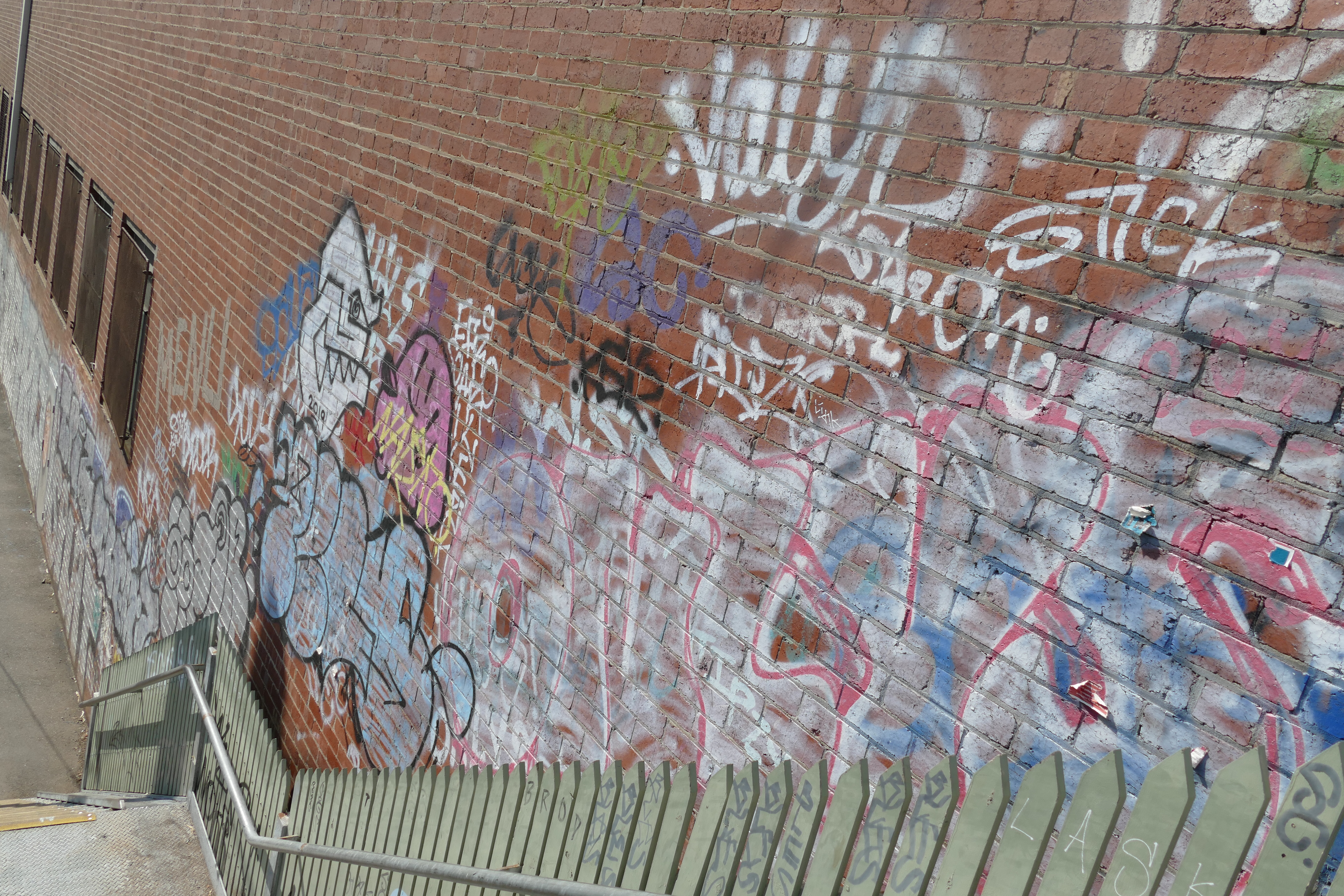
Graffiti is a widespread national problem.

Crime in Australia is managed by various law enforcement bodies (federal and state-based police forces and local councils), the federal and state-based criminal justice systems and state-based correctional services.

The Department of Home Affairs oversees federal law enforcement, national security (including cyber security, transport security, criminal justice, emergency management, multicultural affairs, immigration and border-related functions). It comprises the Australian Federal Police, Australian Border Force, the Australian Security Intelligence Organisation, the Australian Criminal Intelligence Commission, the Australian Transaction Reports and Analysis Centre and the Australian Institute of Criminology as of February 2019. Each state and territory runs its own police service.

The national justice system is overseen by the Attorney-General's Department, with each state and territory having its own equivalent.

Prison services are run independently by correctional services department in each state and territory.

Crime statistics are collected on a state basis and then collated and further analysed by the Australian Bureau of Statistics. Between 2008–09 and 2017–18, the national victimisation rate decreased for personal crime in all categories except sexual assault, and also all household crimes selected in the national statistics. Approximately 5.0% (966,600) of Australians aged 15 years and over experienced personal crime.

== Law enforcement ==
Law enforcement in Australia is served by law enforcement officers under the control of federal government, states and territories and local agencies. A number of state, territory and federal agencies also administer a wide variety of legislation related to white-collar crime. Police are responsible for the administration of criminal law. Sheriffs and bailiffs in each state and territory are responsible for the enforcement of the judgments of the courts exercising civil law (common law) jurisdictions. The various state police forces are responsible for enforcing state law within their own states, while the Australian Federal Police (AFP) are responsible for the enforcement of and investigation of crimes against Commonwealth law which applies across the whole country.

== Justice ==
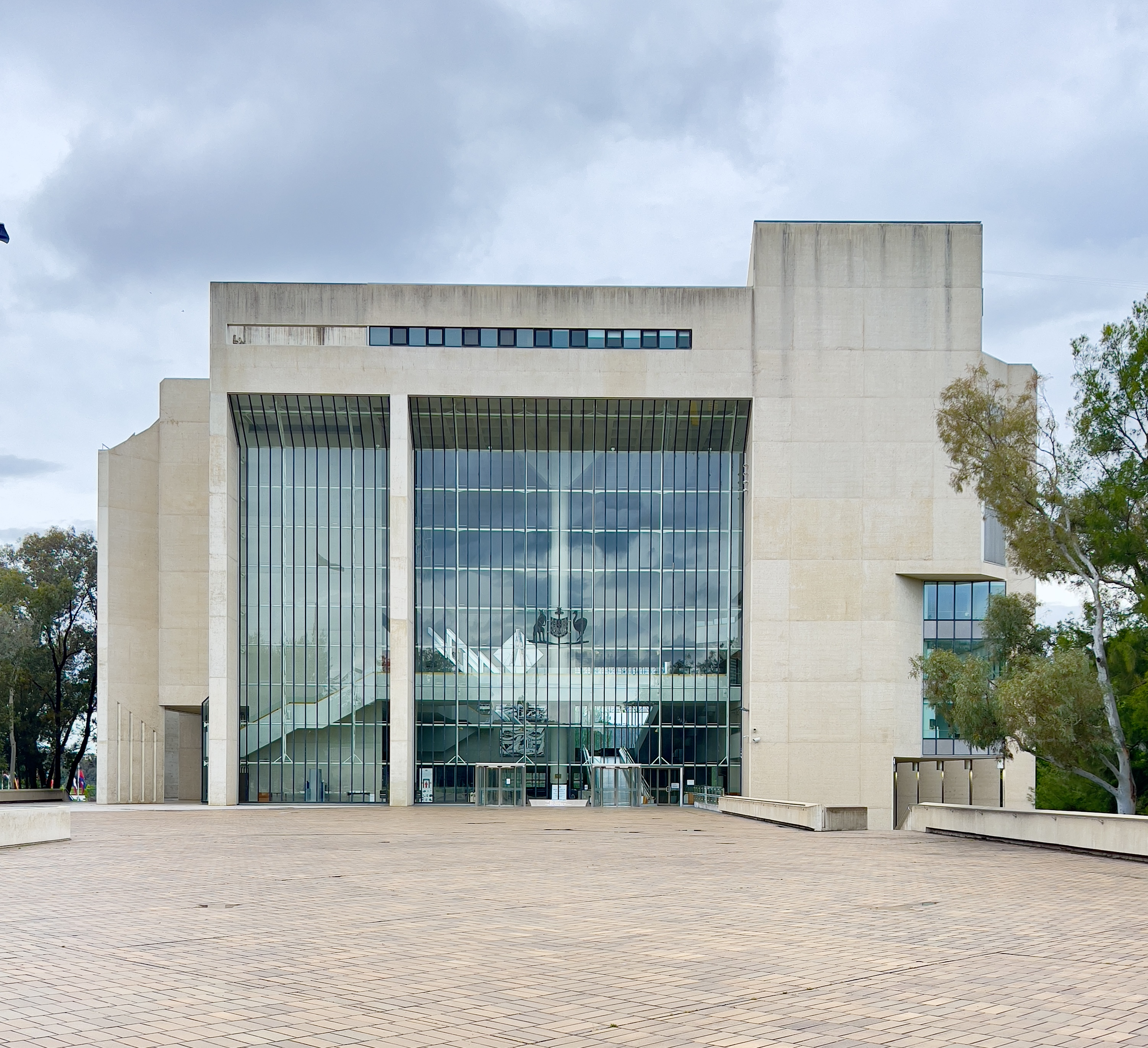
The High Court of Australia consists of seven justices

== Immigration detention centres ==
In addition to the standard prisons run by the states (and not included in prisoner statistics), the Department of Home Affairs also operates a separate system of Australian immigration detention facilities to detain non-citizens who have breached the terms of or lack a visa. Some of these immigration detention centres are used to indefinitely detain asylum seekers and refugees, often without trial and in many cases for several years.

== Crime and crime prevention since colonisation ==
=== Convicts ===
During the late-eighteenth and nineteenth centuries, large numbers of convicts were transported to the various Australian penal colonies by the UK Government. One of the primary reasons for the British settlement of Australia was the establishment of a penal colony to alleviate pressure on their overburdened correctional facilities. Over a period of eighty years, more than 165,000 British convicts were transported to Australia. Discipline was poor among the early convicts, with high rates of theft, physical and sexual assault. Law enforcement was initially the preserve of the New South Wales Marine Corps, which accompanied the First Fleet. Australia's first civilian crime prevention force was established in August 1789, comprising a twelve-man nightwatch authorised to patrol the settlement at Sydney Cove and with powers "for the apprehending and securing for examination" anyone suspected of "felony, trespass or misdemeanour."

=== Aboriginal massacres ===
From the earliest days of settlement at Sydney Cove, settlers clashed with the indigenous peoples. Governor Arthur Phillip himself gave ex-convicts muskets which were utilised to shoot at Aboriginal people in the area, and also deployed soldiers to their allotted areas, who "dispersed" about 50 Aboriginal people. Hidden or sanctioned massacres continued through to the 20th century, the last recorded being in 1928 at Coniston massacre in Western Australia.

=== Bushrangers (1788–1880s) ===
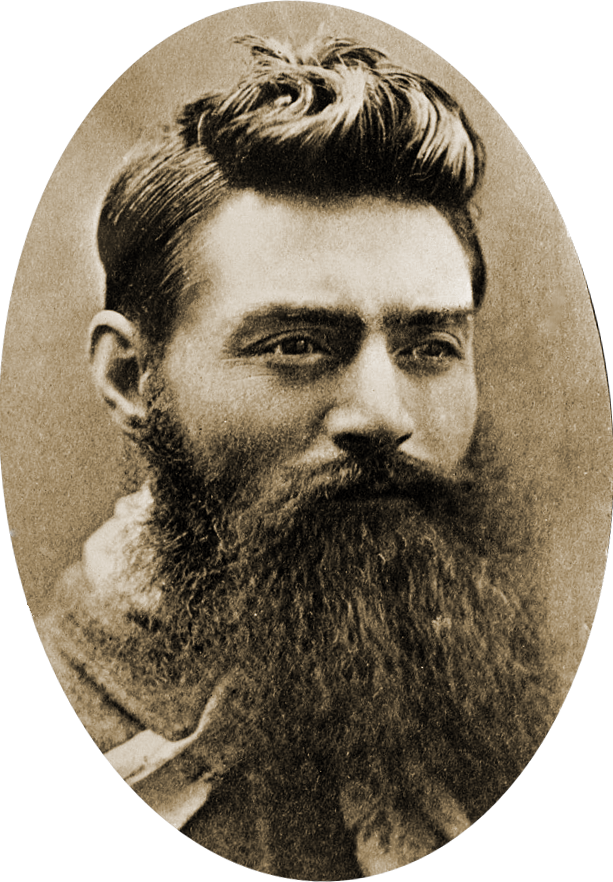
Ned Kelly was a notorious bushranger who was executed in 1880

Bushrangers were originally escaped convicts in the early years of the British settlement of Australia who used the Australian bush as a refuge to hide from the authorities. By the 1820s, the term "bushranger" had evolved to refer to those who took up "robbery under arms" as a way of life, using the bush as their base. Bushranging thrived during the gold rush years of the 1850s and 1860s when the likes of Ben Hall, Frank Gardiner and John Gilbert led notorious gangs in the country districts of New South Wales.

=== Riots ===
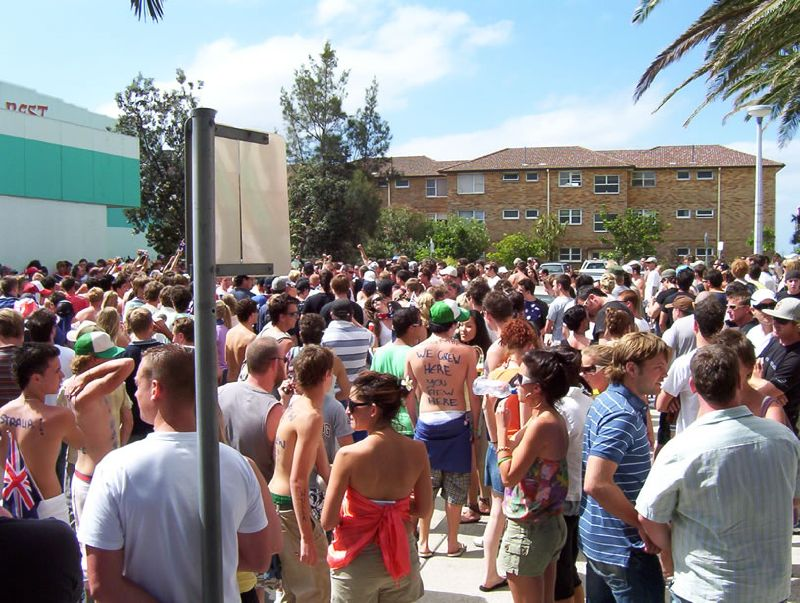
Crowds gather at the 2005 Cronulla riots

Civil disturbances and prison riots, have occurred throughout the history of European settlement in Australia, a selection of which follows:

- Riots at Fremantle Prison, WA (many, between 1854 and 1988)
- Goldfields riots in NSW (1860–1861)
- Bathurst prison riots, NSW (1970 and 1974)
- 2004 Palm Island riots, Qld
- 2004 Redfern riots, Sydney
- 2005 Macquarie Fields riots, Sydney
- 2005 Cronulla riots, Sydney

== 21st century statistics ==
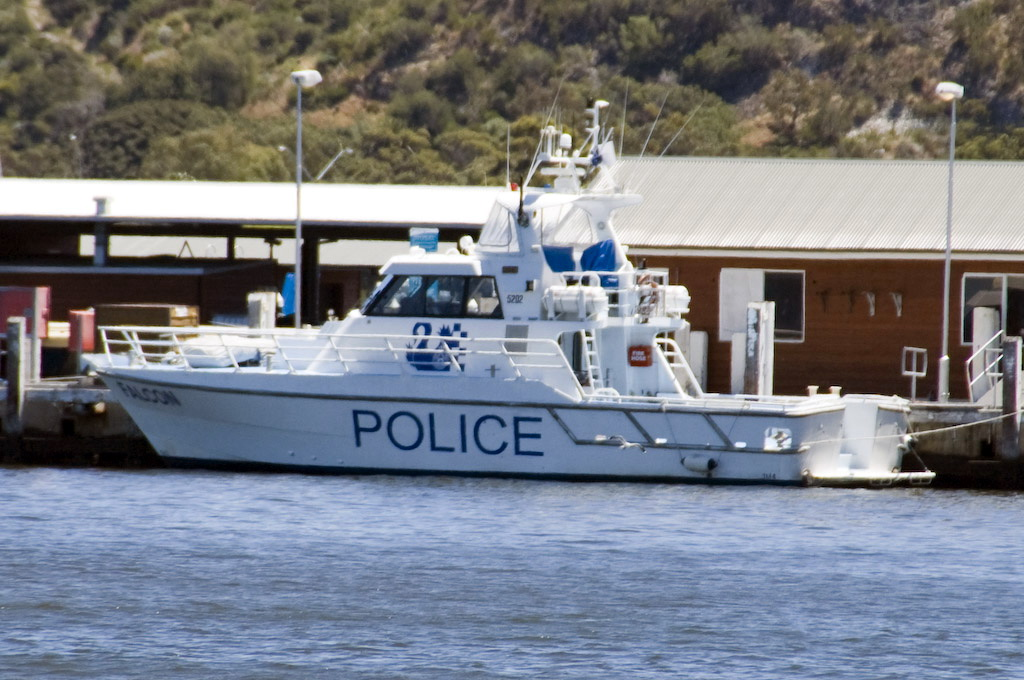
A Western Australian police boat in 2007

The Australian Institute of Criminology hosts an interactive gateway to statistics and information on Australian crime and justice issues, called Crime Statistics Australia. This provides the easiest public access to statistics showing all aspects of crime in Australia, including death in custody, offender and victim statistics, types of crime, drug use, prisons and criminal courts.

=== Crime rates ===
In comparison to other English-speaking countries, such as New Zealand, United Kingdom, Canada, and the United States, Australia in 2020 had an overall crime rate of 6.87 per 100,000 people, while the overall crime rate in North America was higher, with 6.1 per 100,000 in Canada and 8.5 per 100,000 in the United States. The homicide rate in Australia in 2023 was 0.85 per 100,000, which was lower than New Zealand's 1.11 per 100,000 and 1.14 per 100,000 in the United Kingdom. In comparison to North America in 2021, the United States and Canada had homicide rates of 5.76 and 2.3 per 100,000, respectively.

==== 2016–2017 ====
The number of offenders proceeded against by police during 2016–2017 increased by 1% from the previous year to approximately 414,000.

In 2016–2017, the offender rate, which is the number of offenders in the population of Australia, increased slightly from 1.98% to 2%. The youth offender rate decreased for the seventh consecutive year in 2016–17; between 2009–10 and 2016–17, the rate fell from 3,339 to 2,330 offenders per 100,000 persons aged 10 to 17.

The most common type of offence in 2016-17 was illicit drug offences (20%), with sexual assault and related offences increasing by 3%, being the sixth successive annual increase and a total increase of 40%.

==== 2009–2010 ====
Data from the Australian Bureau of Statistics (ABS) shows that during the 2009/10 year police took action against 375,259 people, up by 4.8 percent from 2008/09 figures. Young offenders aged 10 to 19 comprised about 29 percent of the total offender population across Australia. In the 2009/10 financial year, 84,100 women had police action taken against them across Australia, up by six percent compared with the previous year. 290,400 men had police action taken against them in 2009/10, an annual increase of 4 percent. About 30 percent of the women were accused of theft, whereas the most common principal offence for men was intention to cause injury and matters related to public order.

==== Declining homicide rate ====
Between 2013 and 2023, the number of homicides and related offences in Australia decreased from 434 to 409 (down 6%). Between 2017 and 2020 the homicide rate was stable at around 0.87 per 100,000.

Between the 1989–1990 and 2013–2014 statistical years, the national homicide rate decreased from 1.8 per 100,000 people to 1 per 100,000. From the National Australian Homicide Monitoring program report 2012: "The homicide rate has continued to decrease each year, since 1989–90. The periods 2010–2011 and 2011–2012 are the lowest homicide rate since data collection began in 1989”.

=== Prison statistics ===
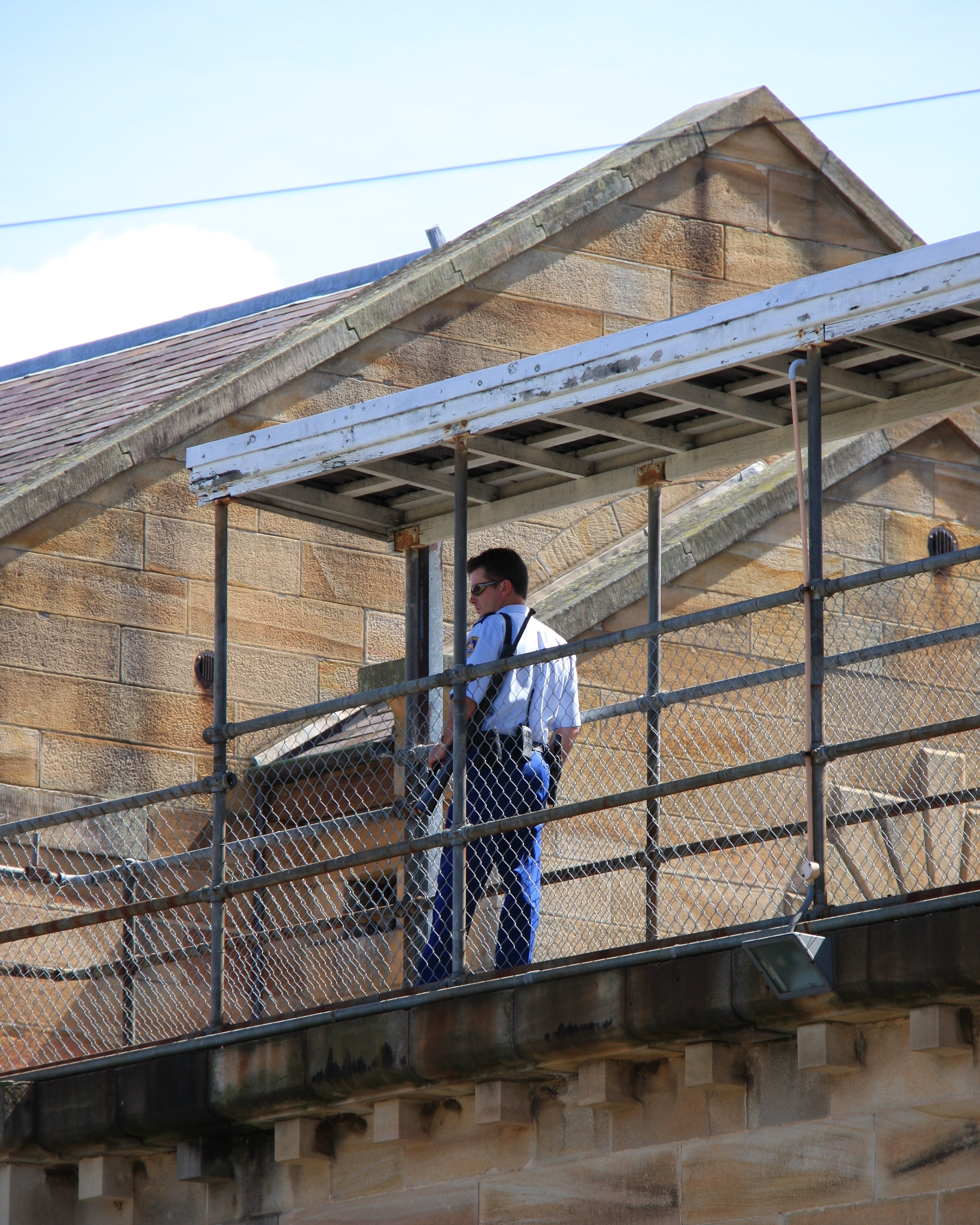
A prison guard at Parramatta Correctional Centre, 2009

Prisoner statistics 2000–present can be found on the Australian Bureau of Statistics page for 4517.0 – Prisoners in Australia.

==== 2018 ====
Between 2017 and 2018 the national imprisonment rate increased by 3% from 216 to 221 prisoners per 100,000 adult population.

In 2018, adult prisoner numbers were up by 4% on the previous year, with female prisoner numbers increasing at a faster rate than male prisoners and with drug offences responsible for the highest rise by category. There were rises in all states except for South Australia. The breakdown was: acts intended to cause injury (9,659 prisoners or 22%); illicit drug offences (6,779 prisoners or 16%); and sexual assault and related offences (5,283 prisoners or 12%). Males accounted for 92% of all prisoners. Aboriginal and Torres Strait Islander prisoners accounted for over a quarter of the total Australian prisoner population.

== Deaths in custody ==
Research from the Australian Institute of Criminology showed that from 1990 until the middle of 2011, 40 percent of people who were fatally shot by police were suffering from a mental illness. In NSW, the fatalities included Adam Salter (shot dead in Sydney in 2009); Elijah Holcombe (shot dead in Armidale in 2009); and Roni Levi (shot dead on Bondi Beach in 1997). In Victoria, the fatalities included the 2008 shooting death of Tyler Cassidy. At age 15, Cassidy is believed to be the youngest person ever shot dead by police in Australia.

In 2013–2015, there were 149 deaths in custody in Australia, The majority of prisoners who died in prison and police custody were male, over 40 years of age and non-Indigenous.

== Indigenous Australians and crime ==
Indigenous Australians are both convicted of crimes and imprisoned at a disproportionately high rate in Australia. The issue is a complex one, to which federal and state governments as well as Indigenous groups have responded with various analyses and numerous programs and measures. Many sources report over-representation of Indigenous offenders at all stages of the criminal justice system.

== Gun control laws ==
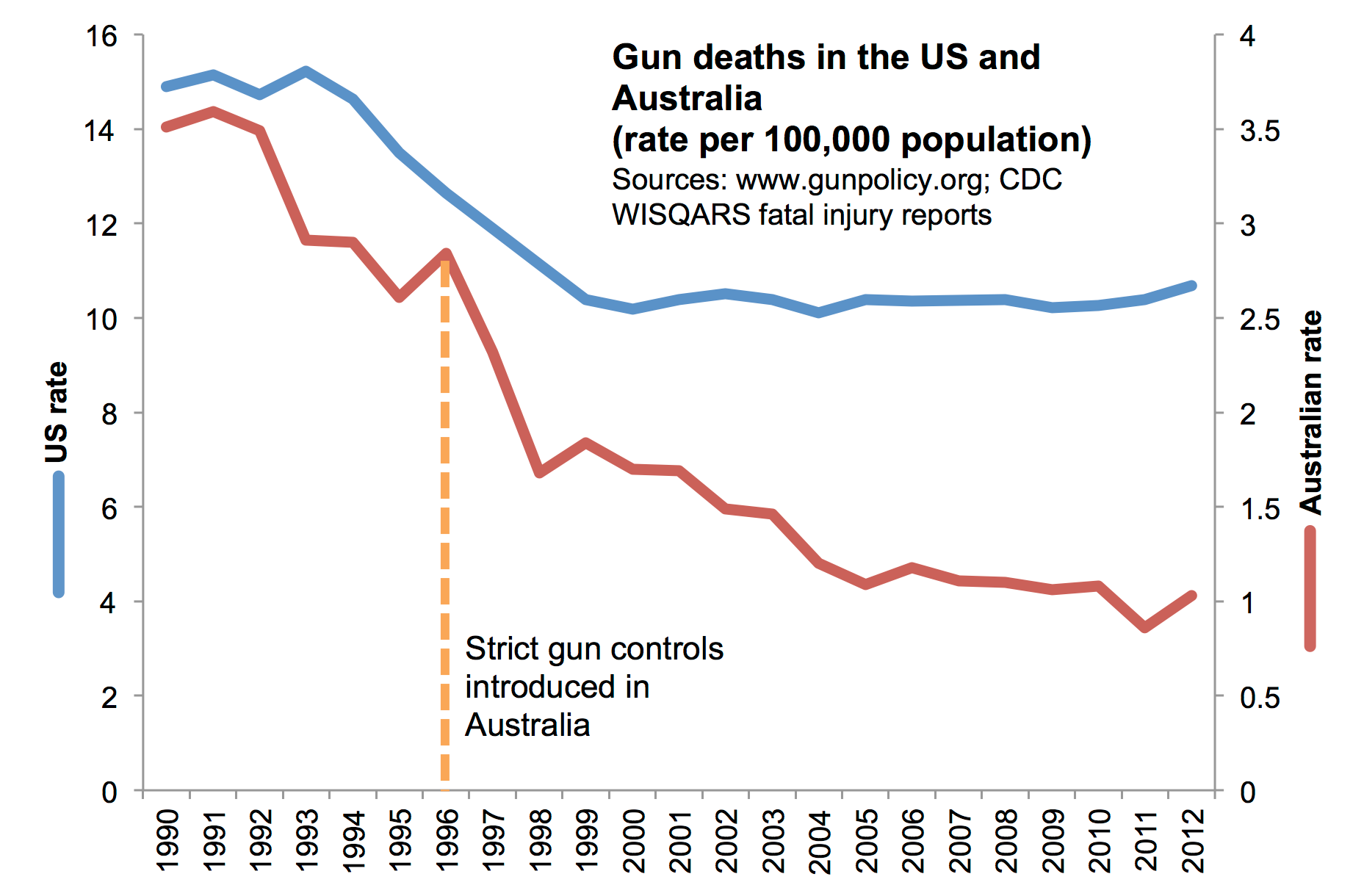
Gun deaths over time in the US and Australia, 1990–2012

The gun buy-back program which was implemented in 1996, purchased and destroyed mostly semi-automatic and pump action firearms. Relatively frequent mass murders committed in the United States serve to re-ignite the debate on gun control laws from time to time, and Australia's gun control laws have been held up as an example of a workable solution for the safer management of guns and gun licensing by citizens of the United States and some members of Congress.

Crime statistics before and after the implementation of gun laws have shown a decrease of the use of guns in crime. According to the national homicide monitoring program, the number of homicide incidents involving a firearm decreased by 57% between 1989–90 and 2013–14, from 75 to 32. Firearms were used in 13% of homicide incidents in 2013–14, compared with 24% in 1989–90.

== Civic organisations ==
- Neighbourhood Watch
- Crime Stoppers
- Crime Victims Support Association

== See also ==
- Christmas Island
- Judiciary of Australia
- Norfolk Island
- Timeline of major crimes in Australia
- List of Australian politicians convicted of crimes
