= Old Coroner's Court, The Rocks =

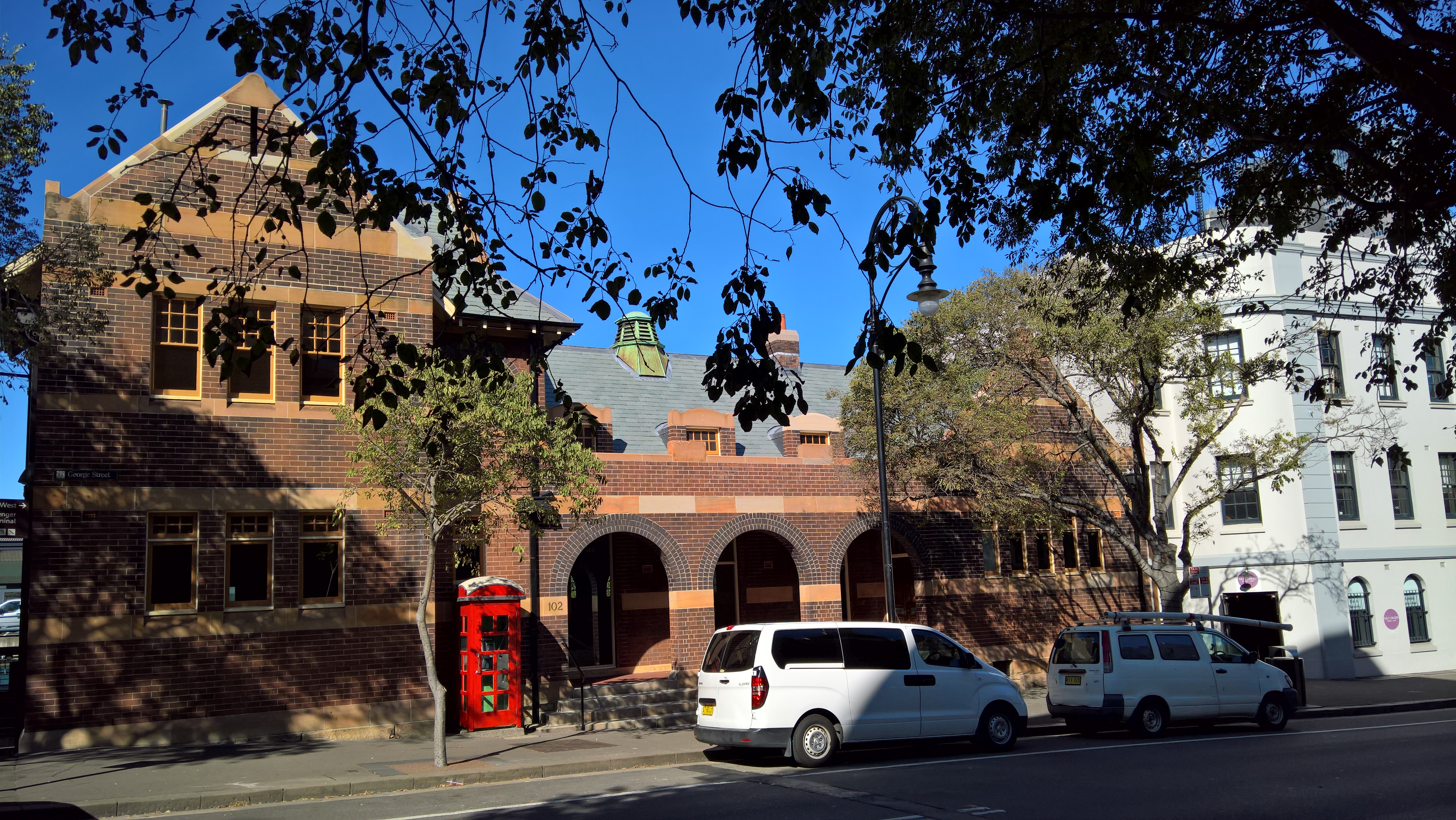
- Old Coroner's Court Building, 102-104 George Street, The Rocks, NSW

- Location within Sydney Location within Australia
- 33.8585°S 151.2093°E
- Location: 102–104 George Street, The Rocks, City of Sydney, New South Wales, Australia

History
- Built: 1906–1908

Site notes
- Architect: Walter Liberty Vernon
- Architectural style: Federation Free Style
- Owner: Property NSW

New South Wales Heritage Register
- Official name: Coroner's Court (former) – Shops & offices; Coroners Court / City Morgue (at rear; demolished); shops and offices
- Type: state heritage (built)
- Designated: 10 May 2002
- Reference no.: 1541
- Type: Law Court
- Category: Government and Administration

The Old Coroner's Court, The Rocks are heritage-listed shops and the site of the former The Rocks Visitors Centre, a former morgue, the former Coroner's Court of New South Wales and offices located at 102–104 George Street, in the inner city Sydney suburb of The Rocks in the City of Sydney local government area of New South Wales, Australia. It was designed by Walter Liberty Vernon and built from 1906 to 1908. It is also known as Coroner's Court (former) - Shops & offices, Coroners Court / City Morgue (at rear, demolished) and shops and offices. The property is owned by Property NSW, an agency of the Government of New South Wales. It was added to the New South Wales State Heritage Register on 10 May 2002.

== History ==
When the colony's dockyard was moved to the area in 1797, this was a prominent site stretching from approximately the site of the MCA to Campbell's Cove. The northern end, including the subject site, of the land was set aside for the residence and garden of the Master Boat Builder, Thomas Moore. This building was later converted to the Naval Office, the headquarters for the imposition of Customs until it was transferred to a new Customs House (now the east store of the Argyle Stores) in 1827. The Naval Office was demolished in 1833.

By 1832, the land had been divided in two by a path descending to the water, this route was very steep and was originally known as the "Go Down" by the residents of The Rocks. The eventual street became Bethel Street, named after the Bethel Union, founders of the Mariner's Church.

In June 1853 the third coroner for Sydney, Ryan Brenan, suggested to the Colonial Secretary that a Dead House or Morgue be built on crown land near Cadman's Cottage. The Colonial Secretary asked Edmund Blacket, the Colonial Architect to prepare plans and estimates for the building. Blackett disagreed with the siting, and suggested that it would be better 'located on the new landing place against the wall of the Campbell's Wharf'. The Colonial Secretary was dubious about the suggestion, as the Campbell residence was nearby and the family may object to having such a building so close.

Blackett resigned in 1854 to work on the University of Sydney and it is unsure if he or his successor William Weaver prepared the plans for the building. It appears the building was dogged by problems. Weaver managed to incur the Governor's displeasure over irregularities arising out of the completion of the Dead House. In trying to resolve the problems, Weaver instructed further work to be done, which the Colonial Secretary's office refused to pay for, leading to his resignation. No plans remain for the building but a specification exists for the work. It was to be a brick building on stone foundations and floors with a slate roof. In 1856 it was requested that the glazed windows be "obscured", presumably as they allowed the public to see the morbid contents.

The problems of keeping such a building in a sanitary condition in the Sydney climate proved difficult. In 1856 it was reported to have been in a "filthy state" in the same memorandum requesting the obscuring of the windows. The Coroner in 1862, John S. Parker reported to the Colonial Secretary that the ventilation was insufficient, "at the request of thirteen respectable citizens who composed the jury that had to view the body of a sailor who had been taken out of the harbour in a state of decomposition and had to be kept there two days". Three more ventilators were added and this may have been the beginning of the tradition of holding the Coroner's Court proceedings in the Observer Hotel across the road. Despite its deficiencies, the building appears to have been used continuously as a morgue for more than fifty years. By 1863, the land had been reserved for a new Morgue which was not built until 1906–07, the reason for the delay is not yet known.

From 1865 the Court of the Coroner was located at Chancery Square, near Hyde Park Barracks. Here the jury sat on inquests and witnesses appeared in a courtroom which was described as "unfitted for almost any public purpose". Inquests were frequently adjourned because of this and some were transferred to the nearby Riley's Hotel. Officially, the Coroner's Court remained at the Hyde Park Barracks site until the construction of the Court and Morgue in The Rocks.

The Morgue was designed and completed before the Court. Before its construction, several structures on the site had to be demolished, these included the old Dead House, a caretakers cottage, and a set of stairs. Construction of the Coroners Court followed in 1907–08. In the process Bethel Street, was reduced to a narrow lane running along the wall of the Mariners' Church. Construction of the two buildings also involved the loss of a large tree which earlier photographs show next to the Sailor's Home. It may also have led to an interesting historical discovery. In 1920 Charles Bertie recorded that "some 30 years ago" a paving slab discovered in Bethel Street turned out to be the tombstone of a sailor on the "Sirius" of the First Fleet. The memorial was to George Groves, a boatswain's yeoman.

The Morgue provided a receiving room for bodies, a central mortuary with seven tables, a post mortem room and a laboratory. The Court was constructed on the higher part of the site, and at the rear of the building was a flight of stairs connecting it to the Morgue below. From George Street the Court was entered through a covered arcade, the ground floor held the Courtroom, separate room for male and female witnesses, offices for the Coroner and clerks and a jury room. Above the offices was a residence.

Government Architect Vernon, was in charge of the design of both the Morgue and the Coroner's Court projects. The court building demonstrates Vernon's concern and ability to design for the particular use and climate. The exterior has a domestic approachable appearance compared to the authoritarian appearance of earlier designs for similar buildings, however the interior retained the pre-eminence of the Coroners position. Several alterations were in 1911 including the addition of a washroom, and the verandah at the rear was enclosed to provide more accommodation.

In 1935 the Coroner's Court was the scene of an inquest into a bizarre death which has become famous throughout Australia. It concerned the alleged murder of James Smith, and became known as "the Shark Arm Murder". On 17 April 1935 a fisherman caught a large shark which he took to the aquarium then located at Coogee. A few days later the shark became sick and regurgitated a large amount of undigested matter, including a human arm with a tattoo attached to a length of rope. The arm was identified by the tattoo as belonging to James Smith. The inquest into his death by the Coroner was challenged in the Supreme Court by arguing that an arm did not constitute a body. This led to calls for the Coroner's Act to be altered.

In 1936 representations were being made that the Morgue was poorly sited. In December the Captain of the P&O; Strathaird observed that the passengers could clearly see into the post-mortem room where a body was visible. Residents around the vicinity of the Morgue, including the Superintendent of the Sailor's Home also complained about the sights and smells from the building. In 1937 the Commissioner of Police organised a conference discussing building a new morgue and the requirements needed. In 1945 the Morgue was inspected by a committee who were less than impressed by its siting and accommodation and they also recorded that at times the stench emanating from the building was offensive. Following this report, required alterations were finally made and the building was enlarged. Meanwhile, the Coroner was concerned about the state of the Court and he submitted a list of urgent repairs in 1948, but there is no record of any work being carried out. The buildings were altered twice more, in 1956 and the final alteration in 1967.

The Court and Morgue underwent several alterations and additions in the period to 1971, when the Sydney Cove Redevelopment Authority (SCRA) resolved to demolish the Morgue and to convert the site to a bus and car park. The Morgue and Coroners Court moved to a new building in Glebe late 1971. The Morgue was demolished in 1972 after green bans and protests by local residents. In the same year the Court building was converted by SCRA to an exhibition space and offices, with a further later conversion to a Visitors Centre in 1973. The building was converted for use as a shop after the opening of the new Visitors' Centre in the Sailors Home in 1995. Since that time it has housed an antique shop and is currently used as a craft gallery.

Archaeology Notes: The "Dead House" stood here from at least the 1830s. A laneway, Bethel Lane, was created in 1861 and cut diagonally from south at George Street to north at Circular Quay West. In 1871 a headstone of 1788 was discovered here opening debate that a cemetery may have been located nearby. The new morgue and coroners court were built in 1907.

== Description ==
The Coroner's Court is designed in the Federation Free Style manner typical of many of the buildings credited to its designer, W. L. Vernon. The style of the building is restrained, relying on massing and modelling rather than architectural detail for decoration. The building is essentially composed of two structures:

- A single storey section, containing courtroom with associated witness rooms, arcade at front and verandah at rear; and
- A two-storey section, containing offices and residence with attic bedrooms.

The interior layout on the George Street level (level 3) was designed around a centrally placed courtroom with a hallway on two sides and a verandah and arcade on the other two sides. The rest of level 3 is taken up by the two witness rooms to the south and the three offices to the north. A stairway in the north hall leads up to the original residential parts of the building on level 4, which replicates the floor below, and level 5, which contains a further two rooms. Additional rooms have been created on level 2, under the verandah.

Style: Federation Free Style; Storeys: Five; Facade: Brickwork/stonework; Side Rear Walls: Brick; Internal Walls: Painted brick/plastered; Roof Cladding: Slate with lead ridge capping and copper valleys; Stairs: Timber.

=== Condition ===
Archaeology Assessment Condition: Partly disturbed. Assessment Basis: Bedrock visible, with floors terraced into hill slope, and below George Street level. Basements. Rear of site level with Circular Quay West. Visible bedrock indicates that the original surface has been cut into. The evaluation of the site depends on the dating of the quarrying, as early levelling will allow the subsequent build-up of archaeological deposits. Foundations of the second morgue (c. 1907), demolished in the 1970s, are present in the vacant site at the rear. It is possible that the foundations also exist for the earlier morgue and the original alignment of Bethel Street as it joins George Street.

Archaeology partly disturbed. It is possible the original alignment of Bethel Street may exist under part of the building.

=== Modifications and dates ===
- 1907–1908 (Coroners Court); 1906–1907 (City Morgue)
- 1911: Alterations, including the addition of a washroom, were made to the residential quarters of the Coroner's Court, and the verandah at the rear of the Court was filled in to provide additional accommodation. These alterations were constructed according to plans signed by Vernon, as Government Architect and E. L. Drew, Assistant Architect.
- 1946 : Government Architect's plans show that the Morgue was to be enlarged by demolishing the 1907 wall facing the Quay and extending the building to the boundary. This work was carried out in 1947-48. Other minor changes were undertaken to about 1967.
- 1972: Demolition of the Morgue by SCRA and conversion of the court building to an exhibition space and offices, including removal of the original courtroom fittings and furnishings.
- 1973: Further alterations were made to adapt the building for use as a Visitors Centre.

The building has since been used as an antique store and craft gallery, minor modifications for the fitout of the shops has been carried out.

== Heritage listing ==
As at 30 March 2011, the former Coroner's Court, now a pair of shops and offices, and site are of State heritage significance for their historical and scientific cultural values. The site and building are also of State heritage significance for their contribution to The Rocks area which is of State Heritage significance in its own right.

The Coroner's Court and its site are significant for the following reasons: It is the earliest surviving purpose-built Coroner's Court in NSW (and the only pre-1970 Coroner's Court), and as such has a unique ability to demonstrate through its external appearance and internal layout and fabric the history of the Coroner's office and of Coronial inquests. The surviving of the building provides the only remaining evidence of the site's association with early colonial methods of dealing with the investigation of unexplained or sudden deaths, over a continuous period from 1854 to 1971. It is a representative example of the public architecture of Walter Liberty Vernon, NSW Government Architect from 1890 to 1911, in its use of an unpretentious, almost domestic design invoking the truth-to-materials aesthetics of William Morris and the arts and crafts movement, and using picturesque elements and a dramatic roof line with restrained use of ornamentation. In conjunction with the other structures of similar date near that location (the Rawson Institute, Hickson Road and the Observer Hotel) it provides evidence of the new buildings constructed in the Rocks area after the area was taken over by the Sydney Harbour Trust. The topography of the site preserves an ability to demonstrate the steep descent from George Street north to the water which shaped the early development of the western side of Sydney Cove. The building has acted an important showcase for the work of the former Sydney Cove Redevelopment Authority, and the Sydney Cove Authority, and its presentation of a public face and as a first point of visitor contact. Its design makes a major contribution to the streetscape of George Street and to a lesser extent to Circular Quay West in its form, materials and scale. The site is of archaeological significance in its ability to demonstrate, through the in-situ archaeological remains, the use and history of the site especially in relation to the previous morgue building.

High Significance Fabric: In general, the Court building as originally constructed, together with alterations and additions to 1911 (i.e. the design and the alterations carried out under Vernon); all exterior brickwork and stonework inc. openings; roof structure, slate cladding, and terracotta chimney pots; all original and early joinery inc. jambs, doors, architraves, windows, sills, staircases and panelling (more see CP). Medium Significance Fabric: All original ceramic tiling and dado capping; all ripple iron ceilings. Low Significance Fabric: Alterations carried out c. 1970.

Coroner's Court was listed on the New South Wales State Heritage Register on 10 May 2002 having satisfied the following criteria.

The place is important in demonstrating the course, or pattern, of cultural or natural history in New South Wales.

The Coroner's Court and its site are significant for the following reasons: It is the earliest surviving purpose-built Coroner's Court in NSW (and the only pre-1970 Coroner's Court), and as such has a unique ability to demonstrate through its external appearance and internal layout and fabric the history of the Coroner's office and of Coronial inquests. The surviving of the building provides the only remaining evidence of the site's association with early colonial methods of dealing with the investigation of unexplained or sudden deaths, over a continuous period from 1854 to 1971.

The topography of the site preserves an ability to demonstrate the steep descent from George Street north to the water which shaped the early development of the western side of Sydney Cove. The building has acted an important showcase for the work of the former Sydney Cove Redevelopment Authority, and the Sydney Cove Authority, and its presentation of a public face and formally as a first point of visitor contact. Its design makes a major contribution to the streetscape of George Street and to a lesser extent to Circular Quay West in its form, materials and scale. - The site is of archaeological significance in its ability to demonstrate, through the in-situ archaeological remains, the use and history of the site especially in relation to the previous morgue building. High Significance Fabric: In general, the Court building as originally constructed, together with alterations and additions to 1911 (i.e. the design and the alterations carried out under Vernon); all exterior brickwork and stonework inc. openings; roof structure, slate cladding, and terracotta chimney pots; all original and early joinery inc. jambs, doors, architraves, windows, sills, staircases and panelling. Medium Significance Fabric: All original ceramic tiling and dado capping; all ripple iron ceilings. Low Significance Fabric: Alterations carried out c. 1970.

The place has a strong or special association with a person, or group of persons, of importance of cultural or natural history of New South Wales's history.

The site is associated with several Colonial Architects, including Blackett, Weaver, and Barnett and the later building with Government Architect WL Vernon. The site has associations with the Colonial and later Government Coroners from 1854 until 1971. It also has association with some of NSW's most notorious cases, including the "Shark Arm Murder" and the Bogle–Chandler case.

The place is important in demonstrating aesthetic characteristics and/or a high degree of creative or technical achievement in New South Wales.

It is a representative example of the public architecture of Walter Liberty Vernon, NSW Government Architect from 1890 to 1911, in its use of an unpretentious, almost domestic design invoking the truth-to-materials aesthetics of William Morris and the arts and crafts movement, and using picturesque elements and a dramatic roof line with restrained use of ornamentation. In conjunction with the other structures of similar date near that location (the Rawson Institute, Hickson Road and the Observer Hotel) it provides evidence of the new buildings constructed in The Rocks area after the area was taken over by the Sydney Harbour Trust. The building's design makes a major contribution to the streetscape of George Street and to Circular Quay West in its form, materials and scale.

The place has a strong or special association with a particular community or cultural group in New South Wales for social, cultural or spiritual reasons.

The site holds social significance because of the former function as a Morgue extending back to 1854 and a Coroner's Court to 1906. It is the site for investigation into deaths by other than natural causes, including some of the most notorious cases in Australian History. The history of the site highlights some of the problems encountered in the history of dealing with death, including advances in forensics, problems of sanitation and the handling of bodies.

The site holds high social value as an archaeological site which may contain physical evidence related to events in Australia's history.

The place has potential to yield information that will contribute to an understanding of the cultural or natural history of New South Wales.

The site has significant research potential as an archaeological resource which can inform about early configurations of the earlier structures on site. Foundations of the second morgue (c. 1907), demolished in the 1970s, are present in the vacant site at the rear. It is possible that the foundations also exist for the earlier morgue and associated buildings and the original alignment of Bethel Street.

The site also contains research potential as it is the earliest surviving purpose-built Coroner's Court in NSW (and the only pre-1970 Coroner's Court), and as such has a unique ability to demonstrate through its external appearance and internal layout and fabric the history of the Coroner's office and of Coronial inquests. The surviving of the building provides the only remaining evidence of the site's association with early colonial methods of dealing with the investigation of unexplained or sudden deaths, over a continuous period from 1854 to 1971.

The place possesses uncommon, rare or endangered aspects of the cultural or natural history of New South Wales.

The site is rare because it is the earliest surviving purpose-built Coroner's Court in NSW (and the only pre-1970 Coroner's Court), and as such has a unique ability to demonstrate through its external appearance and internal layout and fabric the history of the Coroner's office and of Coronial inquests. The surviving of the building provides the only remaining evidence of the site's association with early colonial methods of dealing with the investigation of unexplained or sudden deaths, over a continuous period from 1854 to 1971.

The place is important in demonstrating the principal characteristics of a class of cultural or natural places/environments in New South Wales.

The site, and the Coroner's Court (former), is important in demonstrating:

- its early historical use as part of the original Government Dockyard
- its visual aesthetic, positioned at the edge of Circular Quay West
- the evolution of governmental infrastructure associated with the care of the unexpectedly dead
- the architectural style of the Government Architect, Walter Liberty Vernon

== See also ==
- Australian non-residential architectural styles
