= Killing of Michael Capel =

2008 police shooting in New South Wales, Australia

Michael Capel, 43, an Australian man with schizophrenia, died on 10 October 2008, from multiple gunshot wounds during a confrontation with police at Belmont, near Newcastle, New South Wales. Apparently Capel had come off his medication and become violent. A coronial inquest into Capel's death heard that he had "opened the door to police while holding a large knife and began walking towards officers". Following the death, a coroner has recommended special training for frontline police dealing with the mentally ill.

== See also ==
- Death of Beto Laudisio
- Killing of Jesse Deacon
- Rodney Ansell
