= Roni Levi =

Roni Levy may refer to:

- Ronny Levy (born 1966), former Israeli international football player
- Roni Levi, French photographer, killed by police at Bondi Beach
