= Observer Hotel =

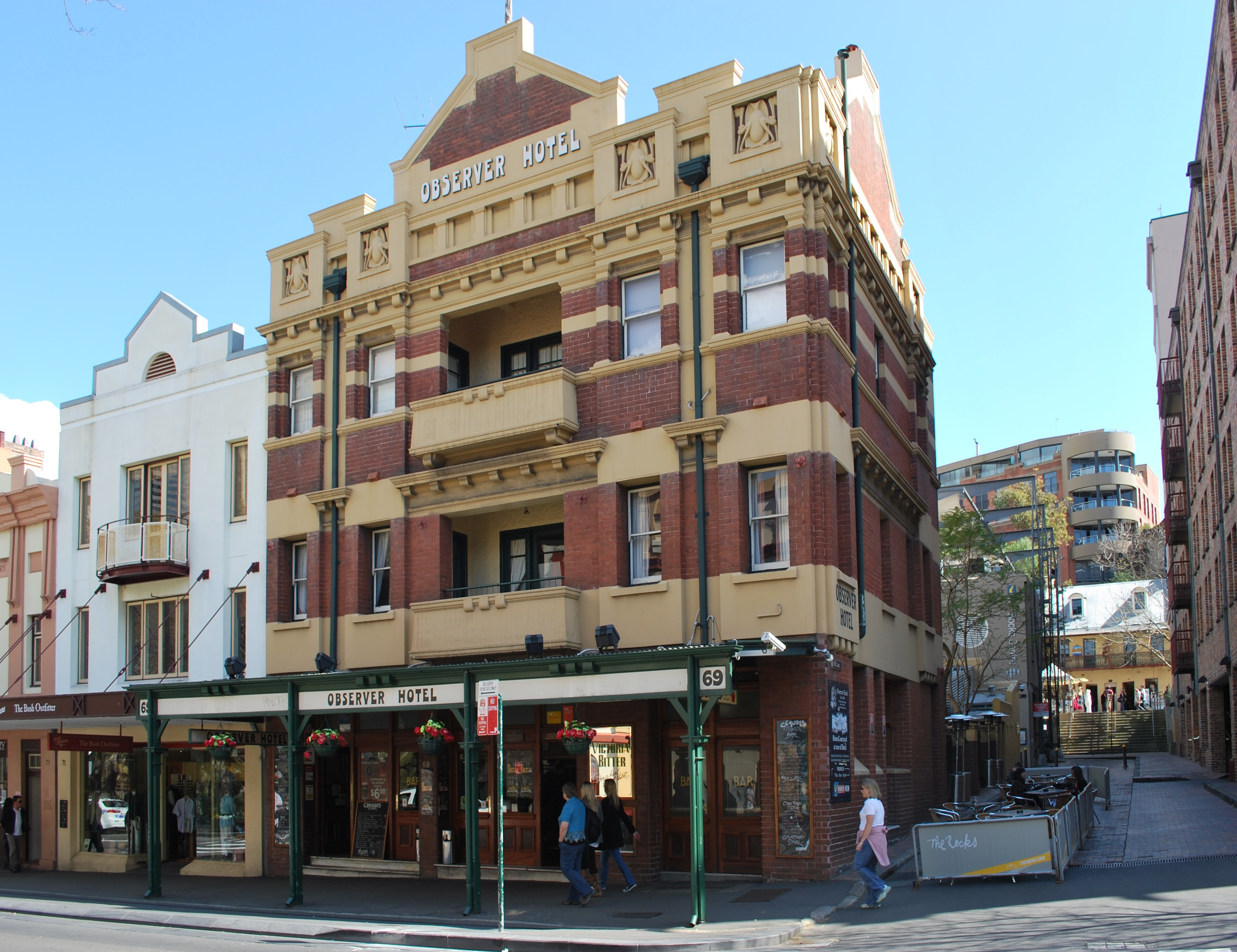
- Observer Hotel in 2010

- Location within Sydney Location within Australia
- 33.8585°S 151.2088°E
- Location: 69 George Street, The Rocks, City of Sydney, New South Wales, Australia

History
- Built: 1908–1909; 117 years ago

Site notes
- Architect(s): Halligan & Wilton
- Architectural style: Federation Free Style
- Owner: Property NSW

New South Wales Heritage Register
- Official name: Observer Hotel
- Type: State heritage (built)
- Designated: 10 May 2002
- Reference no.: 1565
- Type: Hotel
- Category: Commercial

Observer Hotel is a heritage-listed hotel at 69 George Street, in the inner city Sydney suburb of The Rocks in the City of Sydney local government area of New South Wales, Australia. It was designed by Halligan & Wilton and built from 1908 to 1909. The property is owned by Property NSW, an agency of the Government of New South Wales. It was added to the New South Wales State Heritage Register on 10 May 2002.

== History ==
The Observer Hotel is built on the west side of George Street North on land which was, from 1788, part of the grounds of the prefabricated, temporary hospital. Although the site of the hotel is within the area occupied by the temporary hospital complex, no buildings are shown on either Hunter's initial survey or James Meehan's 1807 survey. In 1795 the land upon which the Observer Hotel was later to be constructed was leased to William Balmain. Balmain left the colony in 1801 but the next official lease of the land was not until 1810 when it was leased to William Gaudry who may have erected a building on the site. Gaudry had married the daughter of Henry Kable, a Sydney entrepreneur, and was part owner of the schooner Geordy with Henry Kable junior, as well as acting as an auctioneer and agent for his father-in-law. Gaudry's main property appears to have been near that of the Kables at Minto. The lease of the land in The Rocks was transferred to John Plummer in 1820. By 1824 Plummer was bankrupt and the lease was once again transferred, this time to James Johnston.

A substantial two-storey house with a verandah, stables and stores was constructed on the site by the 1820s. This was the town residence of the Crown Solicitor Frederick Garling. The Garling family emigrated from London in 1815. Frederick Garling Jr., a noted maritime artist, painted a series of views of Sydney Harbour c. 1839, one of which included his family residence which had recently been sold.

In the early 1830s an attempt was made to formalise the leases but this grant was not formalised until October 1838, by which time the lot had been transferred to William Carr and George John Rodgers. Frederick Garling senior is likely to have been making plans to retire; his retirement was formally approved by the Governor in 1839. In addition to his townhouse Garling had been granted 486 hectares (1,200 acres) by Governor Macquarie in 1819.

=== Ownership by Frederick Unwin ===
Carr and Rodger's grant was then transferred to Frederick Wright Unwin, who was the claimant of the lot to the south. Unwin subdivided the property into a series of lots and c. 1845 erected the substantial sandstone stores just south of the site that survive today. A rear lane was created (now Kendall Lane). Garling's house is believed to have been demolished in 1844, shortly before the Waterman's Arms were constructed. Part of the house was revealed during archaeological excavations in the early 1990s.

By 1810 there were 75 "licensed houses" in NSW, a number of which were located "on the Rocks", particularly fronting George Street North and in nearby Millers Point. Governor Macquarie soon restricted the number of licenses issued, one of which was obtained by Samuel Terry. It is partly due to the commercial subdivision of the lots claimed by Samuel Terry and Frederick Unwin and partly due to the proximity to the port and the bonded customs warehouses that George Street North developed a concentration of small public houses. Terry, a successful businessman, claimed allotments in The Rocks in the early 1830s which were finally granted in 1841. Running a hotel would appear to have been a lucrative business, the Observer Tavern was built in 1848 for Robert White Moore, the lessee of the original Fortune of War Hotel from 1840 to 1846.

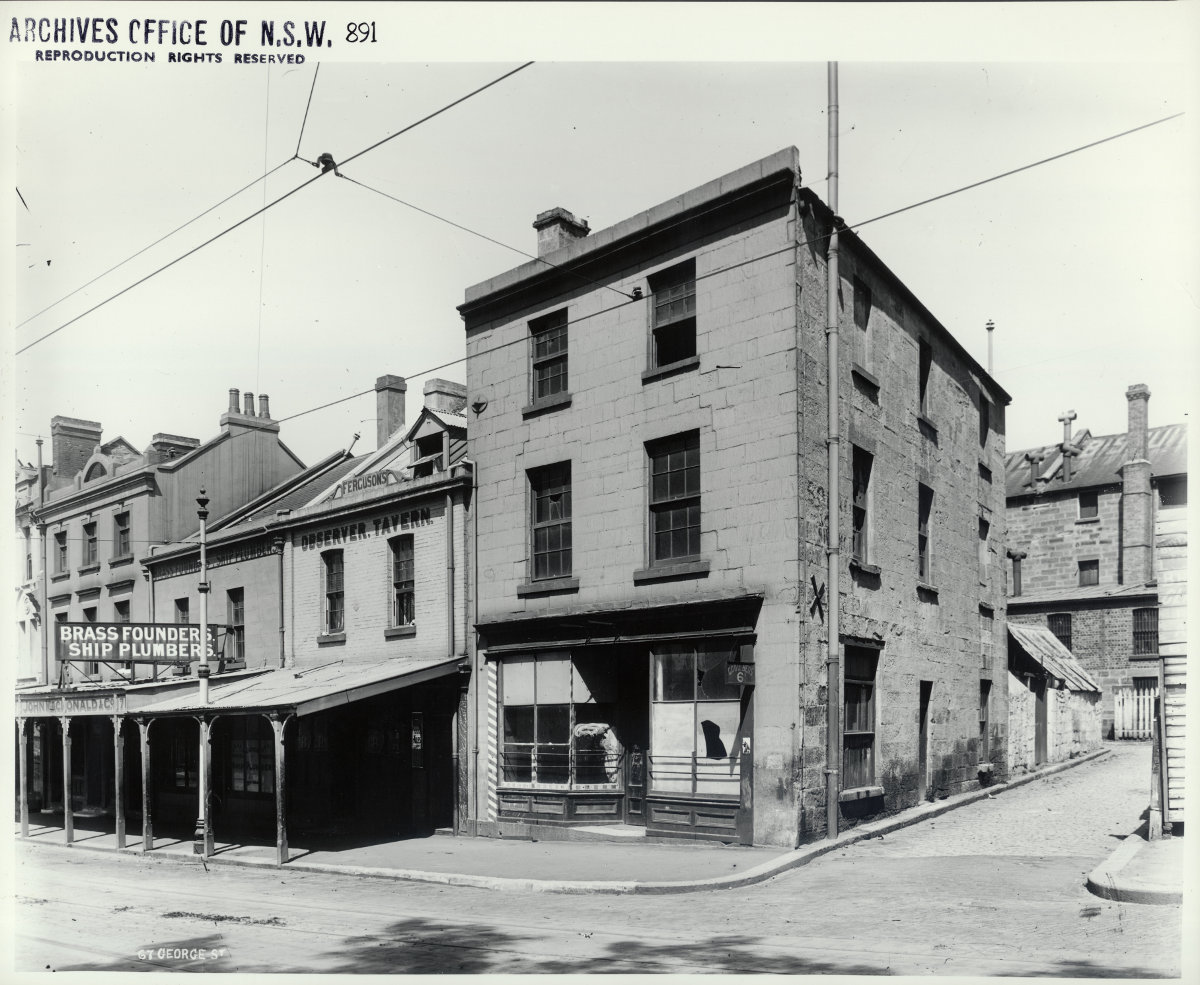
Observer Tavern, 1901 (second from right)

=== Development of the Observer Tavern ===
In the 1840s the block between Argyle Street and Mill Lane developed the character that it largely retains today. The building stock is predominantly Colonial Georgian commercial buildings. The pattern of use also remains similar; public houses interspersed with shops. Corner sites were favoured for public houses. The block still retains this pattern of development with the Orient Hotel on the southern corner and the Observer Hotel (which replaced the Waterman's Arms and the original Observer Hotel) on the northern corner.

The Observer Tavern, as it was originally known, was built in 1848 for Robert White Moore who had purchased Lot 10 of Frederick Unwin's subdivision the year before. The adjacent Waterman's Arms having been built in 1844. The present Observer Hotel, built on a more substantial site than the original, dates from 1908 to 1909 and straddles the sites of both the Waterman's Arms and the Observer Tavern. The Waterman's Arms reflects the numerous watermen who operated row boats on Sydney Harbour, the forerunner of the water taxi and the men may have gathered there waiting for a commission. In Sydney, before bridges were constructed, the easiest way to get to the lower North Shore was by rowboat and later by ferry. The Waterman's Arms was constructed of sandstone and is a more substantial building than the brick hotel constructed adjacent to it in 1848. Adjacent was yet another public house, almost identical in character to the Observer Tavern. The Moore family retained the ownership of the Waterman's Arms until the 1901 resumption.

The two-storey six roomed building constructed as the Observer Tavern for Moore was built of brick walls with timber floors and a shingle roof. Up until 1852 the building was rated as a house rather than a public house. By 1851 a kitchen had been added to the roof, and the hotel is recorded as containing eight rooms. The origin of the name Observer Tavern is unknown, however the first stage of the Sydney Observatory on Observatory Hill, the time ball, was also built in 1848. It is not a common name for a public house. The first observatory in the Australian colonies had been erected on Dawes Point by William Dawes in 1788.

J. M. Forde records John Speerin was the publican in the 1850s, and that the hotel was simply "within a door". The Observer was later operated by John Ferguson, with the adjacent P & O Hotel [Pacific and Orient] operated by his wife Mary. The photographs of the Observer Tavern in the SCC Demolition Books shows a sign reading "Fergusons" on the parapet, and the wording "Observer Tavern" painted on the brickwork below. The Fergusons continued to be the publicans until 1925.

The Observer Tavern was for some years used as an unofficial coroner's court, before the construction of the Coroner's Court and Morgue in 1906. It was common practice in NSW to hold coronial inquests in public houses, although by law if there was a morgue or police station within one mile, it had to be used in preference. In 1856 a panel of jurors requested that the ventilation in the Circular Quay Dead House be improved. The use of the adjacent hotel was probably due to the stench of the bodies in an era when refrigerated morgues were unknown.

=== Redevelopment of the 'new' Observer Hotel ===
The Observer Tavern and the new Coroner's Court were both part of the extensive urban renewal in George Street North undertaken following the 1900 land resumptions. A series of plans survives that records the owners of the premises resumed. The former Waterman's Arms was owned by the Union Bank of Australia, the Observer Tavern was the estate of Arthur Malcolm Moore. The Sydney City Council demolition photographs show that a sandstone building on the corner of Mill Lane (No. 67 George Street North) was demolished before the Observer Tavern; and correspondence between F. Robertson and the Town Clerk survives from mid-1902. A record plan was prepared in December 1901 which indicates that the Waterman's Arms was one of the many substandard buildings identified for demolition by the Resumed Properties Branch. The demolition also allowed for the straightening and widening of Mill Lane, and the regularisation of the block fronting George Street North.

In 1908 J. M. Forde reported in The Truth that:

The government has recently sold the Observer Tavern, with thirty feet frontage and very little depth, an old house, for 3,000 pounds, or one hundred pounds per foot. The house has for ages been a sort of Coroner's Court, where short inquests were held. It will still be a sort of appendage to coronial quests, as the new morgue and court are opposite. Weeping friends can wet eye and whistle while awaiting coronial pleasure.

Plans for the new "Observer Tavern Hotel" prepared by Halligan and Wilton on behalf of Tooth and Co. brewery were submitted to the Sydney City Council in March 1908. The Building Application plans no longer survive, however the watercoloured version of the plans submitted to the licensing board is amongst the hotel plans held at State Records, as are some of the other George Street North hotels.

The plans for the new hotel were approved in May 1908. The ground floor included a bar, two parlours (one of which was for the residents), a dining room, pantry, kitchen, laundry, spirit store. A WC and also a large yard and a public urinal were accessible from Mill Lane. The dining room was also only accessible from the private entry and there was originally no connection into the public bar which fronted George Street North. Upstairs were a series of bedrooms, a sitting room, bathroom, WC and a linen cupboard.

The Tooth's Yellow Card for the Observer Hotel records that the site, allotment 3 of Section of the Observatory Hill lands, was acquired by Tooth & Co. in January 1909 and they retained the premises until the land was once again resumed, this time by the Sydney Cove Redevelopment Authority (SCRA), in December 1977. The approval to build a hotel had been obtained from the Liquor Licensing Board before the land transfer was formalised. The Fergusons continued to operate the public house once the new building had been completed. The date of re-opening of the Observer Hotel has not been determined, nor the builder identified. John Alexander Ferguson remained the publican until at least 1915, Mrs Victoria Elizabeth Ferguson taking over in 1923.

In June 1920 Tooth's architect Mr. J. G. Dalzeil prepared a report noting that the following works to the site and building of the Observer Hotel were required:

1. Asphalt yard
2. Renovate private entrance, stair hall; staircase walls, ceilings and woodwork
3. Repair broken plaster on laundry walls
4. Repair concrete floor of laundry
5. Renovate bedrooms 7, 8 & 9, bath, WC, linen press, 1st Floor lobby
6. Renovate bedrooms 1, 3, 4 & 5 and repair plaster in Bed 2 on 2nd floor.24

The hotel was described as:

A three storey brick building of modern design and good appearance, containing on the second floor five bedrooms, and on the first floor three bedrooms, all of which are up to requirements, reasonably clean and sufficiently furnished. One bathroom, W.C. and linen press are situated on the first floor. The lessee might reasonably be requested to renovate the same. On the ground floor there is a fairly large bar, good cellar, two parlours, private entrance, dining room, kitchen and laundry, whilst at the rear there is a storeroom, small stable, public lavatories and yard. The building is generally clean and in good repair inside and out.

The location of the small stable is not known. The publican wrote to Tooth & Co. informing them of the results of the inspection and that the Licensing Court required a second bathroom and that repairs to the exterior should be undertaken. A second bathroom (on the top floor) was not added until 1938. The hotel was painted in 1928, and by 1933 "the whole of the exterior of the main hotel building and all of the outhouses require painting".

A fall off in trade occurred in the late 1920s when some of the shipping lines were no longer permitted to berth in Circular Quay. As noted in the Tooth & Co. archives:

The trade for 1928 has been showing a slight falling-off since the beginning of the year. Mr Fyfe thinks this is due to a general depression in the locality. He also thinks that the removal of the Commonwealth Line about six months ago had a bearing on his trade. "Mr Fyfe said that the Matson Line was shifted about 3 weeks ago and this made a difference of about 30 pounds a week to his takings". The trade from the Matson Line was distributed amongst the hotels of the area ie the Observer Tavern, Mercantile, Harbour View and A.S.N. Co. The wharves had been shifted to the east side of Circular Quay.

Tooth's reduced Fyfe's rent twice and their files note that as he had been there since 1925 "it does not look like a case where we can charge him with incompetency". By 1930 there had been no improvement in trade, despite the hotel being "scrupulously clean" and being run on the "most economical lines". A handwritten note on the memo states "Fyfe is genuine and so is his wife, his letter should not be regarded as a try-on". In May 1932 Mr. Fyfe, was "a nervous wreck". Andrew Banks Fyfe was issued with a notice to quit in February 1933. His response was that he had: 'Worked and given all my energy for the last 3 years and all I have got is a bed, 3 meals and plenty of work and worry. This request of yours means I am to be turned out without a cent after all I have tried'. Despite Fyfe's request to remain Tooth's proceeded, however the comment written on Fyfe's letter reads: "The unfortunate part of the whole thing is that I really think Fyfe will finish up in the asylum". His fate is not known.

The licence was then taken over by P. E. Goskin in March 1933, then Desmond Bush in August 1934, Oswald Algernon Bush in December 1938 and Nelson Grindal in 1943. Desmond Bush was fined on more than one occasion for supplying liquor during "prohibited hours".

Tooths attempted to counter the impact of the Great Depression by appealing to a wider clientele, and the board room at the Kent Brewery still retained some of their art work from the 1930s depicting elegant women in evening wear. Similar examples of the advertising for Tooth's KB Lager from the late 1930s are held in the Powerhouse Museum, including sportswomen. The collection also includes a series of pub art signs commissioned for the Ship Inn at Circular Quay. The 1949 photograph on the Tooth's yellow cards shows a sign advertising XXX Ale and a smaller sign. The original pub signs did not survive in 1990.

In late 1952 the warehouse immediately north of the Observer Hotel across the lane was destroyed by fire and the elevation to Playfair Lane (Mill Lane) was damaged, including the windows separated from the lane by the rear yard. The estimated cost of the works was £240. The Insurance Company paid the claim. The publican believed that some of the internal rooms had been smoke damaged but Hellyer did not agree.

=== Resumption by the NSW Government ===
In 1960 the State Government invited developers to submit schemes for the redevelopment of the resumed area in The Rocks. All of the developers schemes were rejected by the Liberal State Government and the Chairman of the National Capital Development Commission Sir John Overall was appointed to prepare a report and planning scheme. To facilitate the proposed redevelopment the Sydney Cove Redevelopment Authority was established. The Observer Hotel was resumed by the Sydney Cove Redevelopment Authority in December 1970. Tooth & Co were granted a weekly tenancy and compensation was to be paid. The rental amount equalled the interest payable on the compensation due to Tooths. Tooths had been aware for some months that the resumption was to take place and did not wish to fund the publican's request for the roofing of the beer garden.

By May 1971 the head lease was ready for execution. Tooth's were eventually paid $600,000 of the $1.1 million they had claimed. Their files recount that "we do not expect to get this amount". SCRA files note that: In 1971 Tooth's made it known that they were considering moving the licence out of The Rocks. Faced with the possibility of owning an unlicensed hotel building whose highest and best use was as a pub, the Authority decided in 1972/73 to purchase the licence for $75,000. An additional $30,000 was paid to the Tooths publican for "goodwill". This investment decision was made because: Advice indicated that the Licence Reduction Board would not be interested in creating a new licence for The Rocks, to replace that of the Observer, The Authority had always been of the opinion that The Rocks needed more low cost (hotel style) accommodation and the potential for an amplified hotel redevelopment was obvious even then. The decision to retain the hotel building appears to have been made in 1972/73. The SCRA report noted that the rooms were no longer being used as accommodation.

In 1978 the Observer Hotel, the Kendall Lane precinct and the entire Rocks, as a conservation area, was listed on the (now defunct) Register of the National Estate. These listings follow on from listing on the non-statutory National Trust of Australia register, including The Rocks Urban Conservation Area listing of May 1978.

By 1990 the nature of operating a pub in The Rocks had changed. No longer were the hotels the exclusive watering holes of the working class residents and waterside workers. By day The Rocks had become a major tourist Mecca and, by night, it had become renowned as a major night-time area for young people. Remains of previous buildings on the site were uncovered during the conservation works of September 1991. Soon after excavation work commenced on site for the additions to the cellar, remains of the south wall of the Waterman's Arms Hotel and the north wall of the Observer Tavern were uncovered. The cellars of both buildings were uncovered and a drain running along the north boundary of the old Waterman's Arms Hotel was discovered. In 2000, the licensee of the Observer Hotel, Jim Doughan, engaged Misho & Associates, architects to prepare plans for the expansion of the hotel into the neighbouring property (No. 71 George Street North) where a kitchen and bistro were constructed. In 2006 a historic mural painted on the rear wall of the hotel by artist Helen Davies received an Energy Australia National Trust Heritage Awards for Highly Commended Interpretation and Presentation.

== Description ==
The three-storey brick hotel building is in the Federation Free Style. There is a wide awning to the building. The first and second storeys have central recessed balconies dominated above by a pediment in the parapeted roofline. The hotel is constructed with a flexible non load bearing partition system. It is finished with cement render.

Despite a number of alterations, the hotel is remarkably intact on the first and second floors and the original layout and most of the details are discernible and retrievable on the ground floor.

=== Modifications and dates ===
- 1929: The first major alterations made to the hotel was the removal of the post-supported verandah over the footpath and its replacement with a Wunderlich metal cantilevered awning.
- 1937: Creation of a private sitting room for the licensee and his family (a store room becoming the laundry, the laundry becoming the kitchen, the kitchen becoming the new sitting room).
- 1938: An additional bathroom and lavatory.
- 1991–92: Conservation work was undertaken involving the internal and external restoration of the main three storey building facing George Street, the modification of the existing rear wing, and the construction of a new courtyard room adjacent to the rear wing facing Mill Lane. The existing basement and cold room cellar were enlarged and the toilets relocated to the rear of the property. Archaeological remains were preserved and the design of the rear additions enabled their viewing by the public. The hotel was reopened in August 1992.

== Heritage listing ==
The Observer Hotel and site are of State heritage significance for their aesthetic, historical and scientific cultural values. The site and building are also of State heritage significance for their contribution to The Rocks area which is of State Heritage significance in its own right.

The Observer Hotel demonstrates the extensive urban renewal undertaken in The Rocks in the post-plague era and is a reasonably well-preserved example of a small hotel. Of the five rebuilt hotels to survive only three retain evidence of their interior configuration. Despite a number of alterations, the Observer Hotel is remarkably intact on the first and second floors, indicating the residential character of the upper floors. The original layout and some of the details, including Art Nouveau style detailing, are reasonably discernible on the ground floor although much of the original fabric and all the spaces, with the exception of the stairwell, have been demolished. The Observer Hotel, which boldly addresses the corner of George Street North and Mill Lane in the Federation Free Style, contributes to the historic and architectural diversity of the George Street North streetscape.

The series of footpath awnings along George Street North reflects social and legislative changes regarding shelter of footpaths and society's changing attitude towards the authenticity of recreating supposed "original" detail. The hotel is one of three similarly styled and sized hotels designed by Halligan and Wilton c. 1908 in Sydney and it is the most intact of those three.

Observer Hotel was listed on the New South Wales State Heritage Register on 10 May 2002 having satisfied the following criteria.

The place is important in demonstrating the course, or pattern, of cultural or natural history in New South Wales.

The Observer Hotel demonstrates the rebuilding of the Rocks in the post-plague era. It is a reasonably well-preserved example of a small, formerly one bar, hotel. It demonstrates changing drinking habits by the gradual expansion of the drinking facilities and loss of Women's and Guest's Parlours. It embodies a fragment of The Rocks social history by virtue of the need to protect patrons by incorporating internally supervised lavatories. It embodies changes to The Rocks in the loss of its residential component. It represents changes in laws governing accommodation on licensed premises by virtue of the new (1950s) second floor bathroom and WC. It is an important functioning remnant of the many hotels which once dotted The Rocks. The series of footpath awnings along George Street North reflects social and legislative changes regarding shelter of footpaths and society's changing attitude towards the authenticity of recreating supposed "original" detail.

The place has a strong or special association with a person, or group of persons, of importance of cultural or natural history of New South Wales's history.

The substantial urban renewal of The Rocks and Millers Point would appear to be the most extensive scheme undertaken in Australia in its day. The rebuilding of the hotels indicates that the impact of the Temperance movement, which sought to limit the number of liquor outlets in order to reduce alcohol consumption, had yet to be felt. The site is associated with the Garling family and Fredrick Garling, a marine artist in particular.

The place is important in demonstrating aesthetic characteristics and/or a high degree of creative or technical achievement in New South Wales.

The Observer Hotel, which stands at the corner of George Street North and Mill Lane, contributes to the historic and architectural diversity of the George Street North streetscape. It is an example of Federation Free Style architecture in its own right, and a well-preserved example of the hotel work of architects, Halligan & Wilton. The hotel is one of three similar hotels designed by the partners c. 1909 in Sydney.

The place has potential to yield information that will contribute to an understanding of the cultural or natural history of New South Wales.

The site of the Observer Hotel, as revealed in the conservation work of 1991, contains the below ground remains of the former buildings on the site and has the potential for further archaeological investigation in the future. The changes in the layout of the hotel are well documented in the surviving sequence of documentary evidence.

The place possesses uncommon, rare or endangered aspects of the cultural or natural history of New South Wales.

The use of Art Nouveau detailing in the Observer Hotel, including the façade lettering and the pressed metal dado, is a rare surviving example of the introduction of the Art Nouveau style to Sydney widely promoted by Liberty's.

The place is important in demonstrating the principal characteristics of a class of cultural or natural places/environments in New South Wales.

The Observer Hotel is a well-preserved example of a small, originally one bar, hotel. Despite a number of alterations, the hotel is remarkably intact on the first and second floors. The original layout and some of the details are reasonably discernible on the ground floor although much of the original fabric and all the spaces, with the exception of the stairwell, have been demolished.

== See also ==
- Australian non-residential architectural styles
