= Joanne van Os =

Australian author (born 1955)

- Born: 1955 (age 70–71); Australia
- Occupation: Author
- Years active: 2005–present
- Spouse: Rod Ansell (divorced)
- Children: 3
- Relatives: Chris Hemsworth (nephew); Luke Hemsworth (nephew); Liam Hemsworth (nephew); India Rose Hemsworth (grand-niece)

Joanne van Os (born 1955) is an Australian author of memoir, children's, and adult fiction.

== Early life ==
Van Os was born in 1955, and grew up in Melbourne and moved to Darwin at age 20.

== Career ==
Van Os worked as a lab researcher, a radio operator, a teacher and an electorate officer.

In 2005, she published a memoir about her time with Ansell titled Outback Heart. She has subsequently published three novels for children and a historical fiction novel for adults.

She is currently based in Darwin.

== Personal life ==
At age 22, she met her future husband Rod Ansell, widely regarded as the inspiration for the character Crocodile Dundee, with whom she had two sons and subsequently divorced. Van Os later remarried and had a daughter.

Her daughter died in a boating accident in 2009 aged 16, and her parents decided to donate her organs. After this, van Os became an advocate for organ donation and increasing the amount of accessible information available to families regarding the donation process.

Through her sister Leonie, van Os is aunt to actors Luke, Chris, and Liam Hemsworth.

== Bibliography ==
=== Memoir ===
- Outback Heart (2005, Bantam Books)

=== Children’s books ===
- Brumby Plains (2006, Penguin Random House)
- Castaway (2007, Penguin Random House)
- The Secret of the Lonely Isles (2011, Penguin Random House)

=== Fiction ===
- Ronan’s Echo (2014, Pan Macmillan)
