= Rod Ansell =

Australian bushman and inspiration for Crocodile Dundee (1954–1999)

- Ansell in 1988
- Born: Rodney William Ansell; 1 October 1954; Murgon, Queensland, Australia
- Died: 3 August 1999 (aged 44); Acacia Hills, Northern Territory, Australia
- Occupations: Cattle grazier; buffalo hunter
- Known for: Served as the inspiration for the Crocodile Dundee films
- Spouse: Joanne van Os (m. 1977; div. 1992)
- Children: 2

Rodney William Ansell (1 October 1954 – 3 August 1999) was an Australian cattle grazier and a buffalo hunter. Described to be from "the bush", Ansell became famous in 1977 after he was stranded in extremely remote country in the Northern Territory, and the story of his survival for 56 days with limited supplies became news headlines around the world. Consequently, he served as the inspiration for Paul Hogan's character in the 1986 film Crocodile Dundee. In 1999, he was killed in a shootout by policemen of the Northern Territory Police.

== Early life ==
Ansell was born in Murgon, Queensland, to George William Ansell and Eva May Ansell, the third of four children. He then moved to the Northern Territory at the age of 15. As a young man, he made a living hunting feral water buffalo in the Top End, the meat being exported to foreign markets.

=== Survival ordeal ===
In May 1977, shortly after completing a buffalo catching job in Kununurra, Western Australia, Ansell decided to travel to the Victoria River on what he claimed was a fishing trip. He was not specific about his plans, only telling his then-girlfriend Lorraine he would be back in a few months. When Ansell's motorboat was capsized and sunk by "something big", no one knew where to find him. Ansell managed to board his tender, a small dinghy with only a single oar, and retrieve his two 8-week-old bull terriers and a small amount of equipment (a rifle, a knife, some canned food, and bedding). But with no fresh water, Ansell was in a perilous situation, stranded almost 200 kilometres (120 mi) from the nearest permanent human settlement, and one of his dogs had a broken leg.

During the night, Ansell's dinghy drifted out to sea, eventually washing up on a small island at the mouth of the Fitzmaurice River, north of the Victoria River. Over the next 48 hours, Ansell travelled up the Fitzmaurice on tidal flows, becoming severely dehydrated but eventually finding fresh water above the saltwater tidal range. Ansell subsisted on wild cattle and buffalo, hunting by day to feed himself and his dogs. He sometimes resorted to drinking cattle blood as a substitute for water, the fluids helping to maintain his body's electrolyte balance. He was also able to follow bees to their hive to retrieve honey. During the night, Ansell slept in a tree fork out of reach of crocodiles, although he shared the tree with a brown tree snake. At one point, he shot a 5-metre (16 ft) crocodile, whose head he kept as a souvenir.

Ansell never counted on being rescued; he had told others he would be away for months, and any search parties would be combing over the Victoria River, not the Fitzmaurice. He rested his hope on walking overland to a pastoral station when the wet season began. One day, Ansell heard the distinctive tinkling of horse-bells, which drew him to two Aboriginal stockmen and their cattle manager, Luke McCall. Although he was somewhat emaciated, Ansell was otherwise healthy. Once back home, he apparently kept his seven-week ordeal to himself, fearing he would upset his mother with his recklessness. He later claimed the experience was hardly a big deal, explaining:

All the blokes up in this country, who work with cattle, ringers, stockmen, bull-catches, whatever, all of them, have really narrow shaves all the time. But they never talk about it...I think the opinion is that if you come through in one piece, and you're still alive, then nothing else really matters. It's like going out to shoot a kangaroo. You don't come back and say you missed by half-an-inch. You either got him or you didn't. So that is how I looked at it. Until the paper got hold of the story, and that changed a lot of things.

Newspapers dubbed Ansell the "modern-day Robinson Crusoe" and he was making headlines by August 1977.

=== Media attention ===
In 1977, after becoming a sensation in the Australian media following his harrowing ordeal in the Outback, Ansell met Joanne van Os, 22, a radio operator originally from Melbourne who was then working at the remote Aboriginal community of Wadeye. The two fell in love and married, having two sons: Callum (born 1979) and Shawn (born 1981). The family spent much of their early years living "under just a canvas sheet". With no electricity or running water, they cooked by campfire and communicated by radio.

In 1979, filmmaker Richard Oxenburgh asked Ansell to relive his adventures in the documentary film To Fight the Wild, which the following year was published as a book. Although both accepted Ansell's version of events uncritically, his story was frequently treated with skepticism by locals in the Top End. Some believed it was a publicity stunt and others wondered why Ansell did not follow the river downstream to the nearest town. When Ansell was asked in interviews what he was doing in the remote Australian wilderness by himself, he claimed he was on a fishing trip. Privately, however, he confided to friends that he was actually poaching crocodiles.

In 1981, Ansell was invited to Sydney where he was interviewed by English journalist Michael Parkinson for his television program Parkinson. Ansell attended the interview barefoot. While staying at the famous five-star Sebel Townhouse Hotel, he slept in his sleeping bag on the floor rather than on his bed, and was reportedly mystified by his room's bidet. Ansell's interview and curious city antics sparked Paul Hogan's interest, inspiring him and co-writers Ken Shadie and John Cornell to create the character Mick "Crocodile" Dundee. Following the unexpected blockbuster success of Crocodile Dundee, Ansell unsuccessfully took Hogan to court.

According to Ansell's friends, he was "at one" with Arnhem Land's Indigenous Australians, and like the film character, he spoke "Urapunga" (Ngalakgan) fluently, having become a "fully initiated white man". An "unassuming achiever" who embodied "the spirit of the Territory", Ansell was named Territorian of the Year in 1987 for helping to put Top End on the world map. Journalist Chips Mackinolty, who met Ansell in the 1980s, described him as "articulate and likable, if somewhat intense". However, Ansell's new-found fame alienated him from his peers, and he later lamented of his rejection back home:

Proving the point about the story being true or not wouldn't matter that much. Because the people it would affect, who affect me, are the people who live where I work, and know me. And people up here have a phobia about appearing on the media. So that was detrimental to my standing in their eyes...they thought it was a terrible thing to do.

== Later life ==
In 1985, Ansell borrowed money and secured a pastoral lease in northern Arnhem Land. He started up Melaleuca, a cattle station 140 kilometres (87 mi) east of Darwin, near Kakadu National Park, named after the Melaleuca paper bark trees which dot the landscape. The Ansells built their homestead on the station, not far from the Mary River. In the 1980s, he found himself in a protracted dispute with the Northern Territory government over the controversial 'Bovine Brucellosis and Tuberculosis Eradication Campaign' (BTEC). To comply with BTEC, Ansell was forced to kill 3,000 head of feral buffalo on his property. He had originally planned to capture and domesticate the animals, creating a pastoral herd that would have afforded his family a comfortable lifestyle. Arguing that money spent on the BTEC program "would be better spent on research on AIDS", Ansell considered the destruction of the animals an outrageous waste of good livestock.

Three neighbouring graziers were eventually awarded AUD$100,000 in government loans, but Ansell was never compensated for his losses. Mimosa pigra weeds also began taking over the floodplain, rendering it useless. With no money to fight the invasive weeds, the Ansells were forced to sell their cattle station in June 1991.

In June 1996, he began dating Cherie Hewson. The couple lived at Urapanga Station, an Aboriginal outstation on the Roper River about 483 kilometres (300 mi) south of Darwin. Over the next several years, the couple's drug addiction became more destructive, culminating in a psychotic episode that ultimately claimed Ansell's life in a shootout with police.

== Death ==
Ansell was killed following a police shootout on 3 August 1999. The deadly altercation began at approximately 10:45 a.m. on the roadblocked intersection of Stuart Highway and Old Bynoe Road, near Acacia Hills. Ansell ambushed veteran Sergeant Glen Anthony Huitson and his partner, rookie Constable Jamie O'Brien, with a shot from Ansell's .30-30 Winchester lever-action rifle deflecting off a police car and fatally striking Huitson in the abdomen below his bulletproof vest, and severely injured onlooker Jonathan Anthonysz in the pelvis and lower back. A gun-battle immediately erupted between Constable O'Brien and Ansell upon arrival of specialist police officers from the Territory Response Group. About five minutes into the fight, Ansell was shot dead. O'Brien killed Ansell with a shotgun after unloading on Ansell's position with his Glock pistol, having missed all his previous shots. The battle ended the authorities' 12-hour search for an attacker who shot and seriously injured two nearby residents (David Hobden in the eye and Brian Williams in his index finger) the previous night. Ansell's girlfriend Hewson was with him but escaped before the gun-battle occurred; she fled, eventually turning herself in to Brisbane police on 7 August 1999.

Although police were at a loss to explain Ansell's motive (he could have easily escaped the roadblock had he chosen to), it was later determined that Ansell had been raving about Freemasons prior to his death; he was distraught, apparently convinced that Freemasons had kidnapped his two sons and were now stalking him. During the coroner's inquest, psychiatrist Robert Parker made the following observations on Ansell's mental state before his death:

There is no doubt that Ansell was affected by amphetamine intoxication prior to his fatal interaction with Sergeant Huitson...Ansell's behaviour prior to the initial shots being fired is consistent with amphetamine intoxication with restlessness, hypervigilance, anxiety, anger and impaired judgement (DSM IV). He was also affected by a paranoid psychotic state which is typical of chronic amphetamine use.

Parker also determined that Ansell and Hewson had developed a shared psychosis, stating:

...the two of them developed a shared delusional state or folie a deux...It is possible, therefore, that one or both parties had an underlying vulnerability to mental illness which was enhanced and sustained by their regular use of amphetamines.

An autopsy of Ansell's remains showed he had suffered 30 entry wounds or grazes, all caused by shotgun pellets; the fatal injury was caused by a pellet that had perforated his aorta. The cause of death was determined to be "haemorrhage from multiple gunshot wounds involving various parts of the body". Following the request of his sons, Ansell was given a full Aboriginal burial at Mount Catt, Arnhem Land. His funeral was attended by his sons and parents.

== See also ==
- Death of Adam Salter
- Death of Tyler Cassidy
- Death of Michael Capel
