= John Abernethy (judge) =

State Coroner of New South Wales from 2000 - 2007

His Honour Magistrate John Abernethy

State Coroner of New South Wales
- In office 2000–2007
- Appointed by: Bob Debus
- Preceded by: Derrick Hand
- Succeeded by: Mary Jerram

Personal details
- Born: Wagga Wagga
- Profession: Coroner, Magistrate

John Birley Abernethy (born 1947 in Wagga Wagga, Australia) is a former State Coroner of New South Wales.

== Early life and education ==
John Birley Abernethy was born in Wagga Wagga, New South Wales in 1947. His father, Robert Neil Abernethy, was a bank officer; and his mother was a registered nurse. He has a younger sister, Myra who suffered from an illness which resulted in the family's relocating from rural New South Wales to Epping, a northern suburb of Sydney.

Abernethy attended Epping Public School and Epping Boys' High School. He completed the Leaving Certificate with strong results, allowing him to matriculate to university. In his final year of high school, he was elected a prefect of the school.

Abernethy earned a Graduate Diploma in Law, by correspondence, from the Bar Admission Board via the Law Extension Committee of the University of Sydney (BAB; now Legal Profession Admission Board (LPAB)).

== Career ==
After leaving high school, In 1965, Abernethy joined the (then) Petty Sessions Branch of the New South Wales Department of Attorney General and Justice, where he worked until he became a Stipendiary Magistrate in 1984. For three years after his appointment as a Stipendiary Magistrate, Abernethy sat as a Relieving Magistrate and, later, as a Magistrate at Fairfield and Parramatta Local Courts.

In 1975, Abernethy was admitted to the Supreme Court of New South Wales as a Barrister-at-Law.

=== Magisterial career ===
In 1971, Abernethy was appointed Coroner for the State of New South Wales.

In 1984, Abernethy was appointed a Stipendiary Magistrate for New South Wales; a year later, he was appointed a Magistrate for New South Wales under the Local Courts Act 1982 (NSW), as a Magistrate of the Local Court of New South Wales.

=== Coronial career ===
In 1994, Abernethy was appointed New South Wales Deputy State Coroner; in 1996, he was appointed New South Wales Senior Deputy State Coroner; and, in 2000, he was appointed State Coroner of New South Wales. During his tenure as State Coroner, his office oversaw the inquest into the death of Vanessa Anderson; the inquest itself was presided over by Deputy State Coroner Carl Milovanovich.

Abernethy presided over the inquest into the death of Tegan Lane, the daughter of Australian water polo player Keli Lane.

=== Post-retirement ===
Following his retirement, Abernethy has commented on the car pursuits by the New South Wales Police Force, arguing in favour of them to prevent the escape of criminals.

== Legal issues ==
In 2005, Abernethy was detected to have exceeded the legal speed limit of 40 km/h while driving in a school zone, resulting in the suspension of his driver's licence.

== Personal life ==
Although born to and raised in a Presbyterian family, Abernethy left the church as a young man. In later life, he converted to Roman Catholicism.

Abernethy lives in West Pennant Hills, New South Wales.

Preceded by Derrick Hand	State Coroner of New South Wales; 2000–2007	Succeeded by Mary Jerram
