= Edward Thompson Oram =

Sydney City Coroner of New South Wales (1935–1943)

His Honour Magistrate Edward Thompson Oram

State Coroner of New South Wales
- In office 7 January 1935 – 22 August 1943
- Appointed by: Government of New South Wales
- Preceded by: Herbert Howell Farrington
- Succeeded by: John Alexander Harris

Personal details
- Born: August 9, 1886 Paddington, New South Wales
- Died: September 28, 1965 (aged 79) Sydney, New South Wales
- Spouse: Sybil Violet Oram
- Profession: Coroner; Special Magistrate for the Children's Court

Edward Thompson Oram was an Australian Magistrate who served as the State Coroner in the state of New South Wales from 1935–1943.

== Early life ==
Edward Thompson Oram was born in Paddington, New South Wales, on 9 August 1886, son of John G and Eliza Oram. Little is documented about his early education or family life, but his later career suggests a strong grounding in public administration and legal procedure.

== Coronial & Magistrate career ==
Oram was appointed Sydney City Coroner on 7 January 1935. In August 1943, he was appointed Special Magistrate for the Children's Court of New South Wales & Chief Stipendiary Magistrate Sydney, since 1945.

During his tenure as Sydney City Coroner, his office oversaw the inquest into the death of James Smith —a case widely known as the Shark Arm Murder Case. On 25 April 1935, spectators at the Coogee Aquarium Baths in Sydney watched a large tiger shark on display regurgitate a distinctively tattood human arm. Under intense public scrutiny, the defence counsel obtained an injunction that a severed arm alone was not sufficient proof that a murder had occurred, preventing Oram from conducting an inquest.

Oram also presided over the inquest into the death of Edward Hickey, an 18‑year‑old executed after a controversial murder conviction. Oram refused press attendance at the inquest, reflecting his preference for procedural integrity over publicity. Hickey had been convicted of murdering Montague Henwood, a New South Wales conciliation commissioner, during a train journey between Bathurst and Sydney. Henwood was attacked in the carriage and his body thrown from the train window. Hickey was executed at Long Bay Gaol on 14 May 1936, despite intense public debate and repeated attempts at reprieve.

In 1937, Oram conducted the inquest into the deaths of three women killed in an aircraft collision at Mascot Aerodrome on 24 January 1937. The victims included pilot May Bradford Shepherd and her passengers, Harriet Coley of Kings Cross and Ellen Lattimer of Rose Bay.

== Retirement ==
Oram retired from public service in 1950.

After retiring as Chairman of the Metropolitan Stipendiary Magistrates Bench, Oram publicly criticised the use of short prison sentences, arguing for prison reform in NSW. In 1956 he stated that short term incarcerations served "no useful purpose" and that a probation system would be more effective in rehabilitating young offenders.

Preceded by Herbert Howell Farrington	State Coroner of New South Wales; 1935–1943	Succeeded by John Alexander Harris
