= Shark Arm case =

1935 incident in Sydney, Australia

The Shark Arm case was a series of incidents that began in Sydney, Australia, on 25 April 1935 when a human arm was regurgitated by a captive 3.5-metre tiger shark, resulting subsequently in a murder investigation and trial.

== Discovery of the arm ==
During mid-April, a tiger shark was caught 3 km (1.9 mi) from Coogee Beach and transferred to the Coogee Aquarium Baths, where it was displayed publicly. Within a week, it became ill and vomited in front of a small crowd, leaving the left hand and forearm of a man bearing a distinctive tattoo floating in the pool. Before it was captured, the tiger shark had devoured a smaller shark. It was this smaller shark that had originally swallowed the human arm.

== Investigation ==
After a description of the tattoo was published in the Sydney Truth, Edwin Smith came forward to identify the arm as belonging to his brother, James "Jimmy" Smith (born in England in 1890), a former boxer and suburban billiard saloon keeper who had been missing since 7 April 1935. Fingerprints confirmed the match. Smith was also a police informer. Examination revealed that the limb had been severed with a knife, which resulted in a murder investigation. Three days later, the aquarium owners killed the shark and gutted it, hampering the initial police investigation.

Early inquiries correctly implicated a Sydney businessman named Reginald William Lloyd Holmes (1892–1935). Holmes was a fraudster and smuggler who also managed a successful family boat-building business at Lavender Bay. Holmes had employed Smith several times to work insurance scams, including one in 1934 in which an over-insured pleasure cruiser named Pathfinder was sunk near Terrigal. Soon afterwards, the pair began criminal activity with Patrick Francis Brady (1889–1965), an ex-serviceman and convicted forger. With specimen signatures from Holmes' friends and clients provided by the boat-builder, Brady would forge cheques for small amounts against their bank accounts that he and Smith then cashed. Police were later able to establish that Smith had been blackmailing Holmes.

Smith was last seen drinking and playing cards with Patrick Francis Brady at the Cecil Hotel in the southern Sydney suburb of Cronulla on 7 April 1935 after telling his wife he was going fishing. Brady had rented a small cottage in Taloombi Street, Cronulla at the time Smith went missing. Police alleged that Smith was murdered at this cottage. Port Hacking and Gunnamatta Bay were searched by the Navy and the Air Force, but the rest of Smith's body was never found. This caused problems for the prosecution when Brady was eventually brought to trial.

Brady was arrested on 16 May and charged with the murder of Smith. A taxicab driver testified that he had taken Brady from Cronulla to Holmes' address at 3 Bay View Street, McMahons Point on the day Smith had gone missing, and that "he was dishevelled, he had a hand in a pocket and wouldn't take it out... it was clear that [he] was frightened."

Initially, Holmes denied any association with Brady but four days later, on 20 May 1935, the businessman went into his boatshed and attempted suicide by shooting himself in the head with a .32 calibre pistol. However, the bullet instead flattened against the bone of his forehead and he was merely stunned. Revived after falling into the water, he crawled into his speedboat and led two police launches on a chase around Sydney Harbour for approximately four hours until he was finally caught and taken to hospital.

== Second murder ==
In early June 1935, Holmes decided to cooperate with the police in investigating the murder of Smith. He told Detective Sergeant Frank Matthews that Brady had killed Smith, dismembered his body and stowed it into a trunk that he had then thrown into Gunnamatta Bay. He then claimed Brady had come to his home, showed him the severed arm and threatened Holmes with murder if he did not receive £500 immediately. Holmes also admitted that after Brady had left his home, he travelled to the Sydney coastal suburb of Maroubra and discarded Smith's arm in the surf.

On 11 June 1935, Holmes withdrew £500 from his account and late in the evening left home, telling his wife he had to meet someone. He was also very cautious as he left his home, accompanied by his wife to the door of his Nash sedan. Early the next morning, he was found dead in his car at Hickson Road, Dawes Point. He had been shot three times at close range. The crime scene was made to appear that Holmes had committed suicide, but forensic police had no doubt that he was murdered. Holmes had been due to give evidence at Smith's inquest later that morning.

Holmes was cremated at Northern Suburbs Crematorium on 13 June 1935. He left an estate valued at over £34,000 in 1935.

== Coroner's inquest ==
The Coroner's inquest into Smith's death began on 12 June 1935 at the City Coroner's Court directed by Mr. Edward Thompson Oram, the same day Holmes was found dead in his car with gunshot wounds to his chest. Although Holmes was the inquest's main witness, he was never offered police protection before his testimony could be heard. Forensic evidence was examined by forensic pathologist Sir Sydney Smith.

The lawyer serving Brady, Clive Evatt KC (1900–1984), claimed to the coroner that there was not enough substance to begin the inquest. Evatt argued that an arm "did not constitute a body", and that Smith, minus his arm, could still be alive. The case is still unsolved.

The inquest's most important witness, Holmes, was then dead; the case against Brady was insufficient due to lack of evidence. The Shark Arm Murders suggests that Smith was killed by Brady on the orders of gangster Edward Frederick ("Eddie") Weyman, who was arrested while attempting to defraud a bank with a forged cheque in 1934 and later during a bank robbery, apparently due to information Smith had given to the police. Smith had been exposed as a police informant and therefore would have been targeted for assassination.

The police charged Brady with the murder of Smith, although he was later acquitted. For the next 30 years, Brady maintained that he was in no way involved with the murder of Smith. He died at Concord Repatriation General Hospital in Sydney on 18 April 1965, aged 76.

== Cultural references ==
The investigation into the murder of Smith and his severed arm became legendary in Australia's legal history.

It inspired the 1960 TV play The Grey Nurse Said Nothing.

In his 1995 book The Shark Arm Murders, Professor Alex Castles claims that Holmes took out a contract on his own life to spare his family the public disgrace of conviction.

A book, published in 2020, provides some new and plausible insight into the case. Written by Phillip Roope and Kevin Meagher, the book is titled Shark arm: a shark, a tattooed arm and two unsolved murders.

In 2024, Richard Fidler interviewed Phillip Roope on the ABC's Conversations program. The interview focuses on the new and impelling evidence, how the writers went about researching the case, and why. You can hear the interview on the ABC listen app.

Bill Bryson also mentions this case in his book Down Under (known as In a Sunburned Country in the U.S.), but wrongly implies that the arm belonged to a swimmer who was eaten by the shark.

The Shark Arm case was the basis of a 2003 episode of CSI: Miami. This case was also featured on Season 5, Episode 2 of the popular YouTube series BuzzFeed Unsolved.

It was also the basis for season 4 episode 15 of the comedy crime series Psych (titled "The Head, the Tail, the Whole Damn Episode").

The 2025 TV series Sunny Nights. A tattooed arm is found in an exploded crocodile on Little Bay golf course Little Bay, New South Wales a few kilometres from Coogee, New South Wales where the shark was captured in 1935.

The case was mentioned in the first episode of Autopsy (TV series).

== See also ==
- List of unsolved murders (1900–1979)
