= Mary Jerram =

Australian lawyer

Her Honour Magistrate Mary Jerram

State Coroner of New South Wales
- In office 7 May 2007 – 11 Nov 2013
- Appointed by: John Hatzistergos
- Preceded by: John Abernethy
- Succeeded by: Michael Barnes

Personal details
- Born: 6 November 1945 (age 81) Dunedin, New Zealand
- Spouse: Ian Cameron; Philip Manning Taylor (since 1995)
- Profession: Coroner; Magistrate; Solicitor; Teacher

Mary Stella Jerram AM (born 6 November 1945) is a former State Coroner of New South Wales. Jerram was made a Member of the Order of Australia (AM) in the Honorary Division in the 2018 Australia Day Honours: "For significant service to the law in New South Wales as State Coroner, and as a role model for women in the legal profession."

== Early life and education ==
Born and raised in Dunedin, New Zealand in 1945 to a "fairly conservative middle-class family", Jerram attended St. Hilda's Collegiate School in Dunedin, New Zealand, and the University of Otago, where she graduated with a Bachelor of Arts with a major in Languages. Following her graduation, she was gainfully employed as a high school teacher of English and modern languages in Sydney, having moved there in 1969 with her husband and two young children.

Regarding her career as a teacher, Jerram states that, "at the same time, I think I never really saw myself as teaching for the rest of my life" and with a previous history of advocacy, she soon thereafter commenced law studies.

== Career ==
=== Early legal career ===
Following her completion of law studies, Jerram worked as a legal officer at the New South Wales Independent Teachers' Union from 1980 to 1987 and as a criminal duty solicitor and senior advocate at the New South Wales Legal Aid Commission from 1987 to 1994, up until her secondment to an industrial inquiry into prisoners and prison officers.

=== Magisterial appointment ===
In 1994, Jerram was appointed as a Magistrate; after one general year and one as a specialist Children's Magistrate of New South Wales, she undertook the Goulburn country circuit for the next two-and-a-half years.

In 2000, Jerram became the Deputy Chief Magistrate of the Local Court of New South Wales. In this capacity and role, Jerram provided advice regarding legislative and other proposals of assistance to the New South Wales Government and also education for other magistrates.

=== Early retirement ===
At the end of 2001, Jerram took an early retirement to live on a 304-hectare (750-acre) farm in her homeland of New Zealand. For the following five years, she had a commission as Acting Magistrate and came from New Zealand about five times a year for a fortnight to act as a locum, mainly at the Downing Centre in Sydney, Australia.

=== Magisterial reappointment ===
After 5 years of retirement, Jerram "missed the law and […] Australia" and moved back to Australia.

In October 2006, she was re-appointed as a full-time New South Wales magistrate.

=== Coronial appointment ===
Jerram was appointed by New South Wales Government Attorney-General John Hatzistergos, with the announcement made on 3 May 2007, and succeeded John Abernethy as the State Coroner of NSW.

Commencing her (initially) 5-year contract and her tenure as State Coroner of New South Wales on 7 May 2007, Jerram became the first female State Coroner of New South Wales and was assisted by the Deputy State Coroner, His Honour Magistrate Paul A. MacMahon. Jerram retired in November 2013.

=== Notable Cases ===
In 2008, Jerram presided over an inquest into the death of Jacob Kovco. Kovco was a private in the Australian Army who was killed while deployed to Iraq in 2006. He was fatally wounded by a single shot to the head from his own Browning 9mm sidearm. A military inquiry found Private Kovco accidentally shot himself while mishandling his pistol. This conclusion was disputed by his family and on 2 April 2008, a jury inquest returned a similar verdict, finding that his death was "irresponsibly self-inflicted", and that when he pulled his gun's trigger he "disregarded the possible consequences of danger".

== Personal life ==
Jerram was married to Ian Cameron, with whom she had joined the Australian Labor Party in October 1975. Jerram left the ALP around 1987.

Jerram relocated to the Sydney suburb of Beecroft in 1969 with Cameron and her two children. She moved to Balmain a few months before joining the ALP.

Her partner since 1995 has been Philip Manning Taylor.

Preceded by John Abernethy	State Coroner of New South Wales; 2007–2013	Succeeded by Michael Barnes
