= Death of Beto Laudisio =

2012 death of Brazilian man under police custody

Roberto Laudisio Curti
- Born: 1991
- Died: 18 March 2012 (age 21); Sydney CBD, Australia
- Cause of death: Undetermined causes, in the course of being restrained by members of the New South Wales Police Force
- Resting place: São Paulo, Brazil

Roberto Laudisio Curti (died 18 March 2012), known as Beto Laudisio, was a 21-year-old man from São Paulo, Brazil. He died on 18 March 2012 after being pursued, tackled, tasered, sprayed with OC spray, and physically compressed under the weight of multiple police officers of the New South Wales Police Force in Sydney, Australia.

== Death ==
On the evening of 17 March 2012 (St Patrick's Day), along with two friends, Roberto Laudisio Curti consumed a quantity of LSD, which caused him to suffer from acute psychosis, manifesting as an array of delusional and paranoid behaviours. It also caused him to suffer from elevated body temperature, prompting him to eventually remove most of his clothes.

After calling his sister with whom he was staying and asking her "why are you trying to kill me?" at 04:31, he got into a taxicab and left the vehicle without paying between 04:45 and 05:21. Curti then got into a fight with four unidentified men in Sydney central business district (CBD) before entering a convenience store on King St. There, he informed the manager that people were trying to kill him, and that he was "a messenger from God". He left the store and then entered it a second time, forced himself into a cashier's cubicle by jumping over the door, scrambled across the counter, took two packets of biscuits and left.

A street-cleaner who saw this taking place inside the store called 000 and reported the incident, which was classified as an "armed robbery" following NSW police Standard Operating Procedures, although no weapons had been seen. Curti was spotted by police on Pitt St, who attempted to question him about the robbery. Curti ran away from them, prompting the police to give chase. While attempting to subdue him, tasers were discharged in probe mode a number of times, although all but one appear to have missed or malfunctioned.

During a struggle on the ground, tasers were used in drive-stun mode 7 times, and "at least some of the contents of each of three cans" of OC spray was discharged at Curti's face. He was also being compressed under the weight of multiple police officers lying or pressing down on his upper body. At approx. 06:11:40, he suddenly stopped struggling and became quiet, and officers noticed he had stopped breathing. Officers commenced CPR and called the Ambulance Service of NSW to attend the scene, but on the arrival of the latter Curti was pronounced life extinct. An autopsy could not determine a direct cause of death.

== Cause of death ==
During the inquest, the cause of death was also not determined. Five causes of death were, however, specifically ruled out:

1. The tasering, either in drive stun or probe mode: Experts determined that there was insufficient electricity to have caused a heart rhythm disruption in drive stun mode, nor were any pair of probes positioned either side of the heart (as was the case in scholarly articles in which it has been suggested that Taser may have caused ventricular fibrillation).
2. OC spray: Experts determined that it was not capable of causing Curti's death, however they stated that they could not exclude the possibility that the OC spray may have caused some decrease in respiration.
3. LSD: LSD is extremely unlikely to cause death particularly in a small dose. It is not known as a direct cardiac cause.
4. Excited delirium: While experts acknowledged that Curti exhibited signs of excited delirium, they did not postulate it as a cause of death, arguing instead that the condition was "a series of behavioural events linked with illness, seizures and drug ingestion rather than a cause of death".
5. Anatomical causes: No evidence was found enabling anatomical diagnosis or structural abnormality. While Curti did have a minor heart rhythm abnormality, observable from an ECG conducted in Brazil prior to his death, this was found not contributory to his death.

Causes of death which were considered possible by some of the experts included:

- Positional Asphyxia - from the weight of the police officers, impeding respiration. This would have caused the heart to stop within one minute of respiration ceasing.
- A Cardiac Arrhythmia - such as ventricular fibrillation induced by an excited delirium state.
- A neurological effect - from the outpouring of catecholamines affecting brain function. This is also associated in medical literature with Excited Delirium.

State Coroner of New South Wales Mary Jerram opined that "Roberto’s death clearly arose from complex and multi-factorial causes, with no confirmed single identifiable cause. Nevertheless, it is impossible to believe that he would have died but for the actions of police. All of the medical experts agreed that his death was not coincidental."

== Aftermath ==
Memorial services were conducted following Laudisio's death, both in Australia in the Sydney suburb of Bondi where his funeral was held, and in Brazil. A Coronial Inquest commenced on 8 October 2012 with the objective of determining the causes and circumstances surrounding Laudisio's death, and focused on the force used by the police. Beto's family were legally represented by Sebastian De Brennan, Kieran Ginges and Peter Hamill SC. Extensive footage of the incident was released to the media during the Inquest, including "TaserCam" footage showing Laudisio falling and writhing in pain.

Coroner Mary Jerram condemned the police actions, describing them as "thuggish" and involving excessive force, and recommended that five of the officers involved should face disciplinary actions. Although Jerram praised the police investigators, the investigators were later criticised by the New South Wales Ombudsman, who tabled a report querying why the investigation failed to look at the issue of police misconduct.

On 20 May 2013, the Police Integrity Commission recommended that the Office of the Director of Public Prosecutions should consider charging some of the officers involved in the incident. On 13 December 2013, the Director of Public Prosecutions announced that two of the officers were to be charged with common assault, and a further two officers were to be charged with assault occasioning actual bodily harm.

On 1 October 2015, it was announced that the final of the three officers charged was controversially cleared of any wrongdoing.

The Brazilian government wrote to the Australian government in December 2014 to express its frustration on the handling of the situation.

In mid-2013, NSW Police explained that the use of tasers during foot pursuits was prohibited unless the person caused a great risk of bodily harm to other people, or if they are visibly armed and dangerous. NSW Police also stated that police should not use tasers during any foot pursuit, and that officers are trained to only use it if there is a threat, which there is not in a foot pursuit.
