= Killing of Roni Levi =

1997 police shooting in Sydney, Australia

Roni Levi was a French freelance photographer who, while experiencing an episode of mental disturbance, was shot and killed by members of the New South Wales Police Force at Bondi Beach in 1997. The incident is one of Australia's most controversial shootings by police.

== Death ==
On the morning of 28 June 1997, Roni Levi was surrounded by six NSW Police Officers after being found walking at Bondi Beach with a knife. Levi, who had been diagnosed as mentally ill, spent the previous evening at St Vincent's Hospital, after suffering a delusional episode. After a 25-minute standoff two of the police officers, Constable Rodney Podesta and Senior Constable Anthony Dilorenzo, shot Roni Levi four times. Levi, who died from his wounds soon after, was 33 years old. In statements given on the day of the shooting, Podesta and Dilorenzo reported that Levi had lunged at them with the knife, and was a potential threat to spectators on the promenade. At the time of the shooting, both Podesta and Dilorenzo were the subject of covert internal affairs investigations; one concerning Podesta's suspected sale of drugs, and another concerning Dilorenzo's associations with known drug suppliers. Neither Podesta or Dilorenzo were subjected to drug or alcohol testing after the shooting.

== Photographs of Levi's death ==
Photographs showing the moments leading up to, and directly after, the shooting were captured by a passing professional photographer, Jean Pierre Bratanoff-Firgoff. The photographs, which showed Levi standing at some distance from police officers, appeared to contradict the statements made by Podesta and Dilorenzo; specifically that Levi had threatened police by lunging at them. Both police officers were unaware the photographs were taken at time of giving their statements. The next day, Jean Pierre Bratanoff-Firgoff's photographs of the incident were published in the Sydney Morning Herald newspaper, and were subsequently distributed internationally.

== Aftermath ==
The death of Roni Levi was the subject of a highly publicised coronial inquiry. In his March 1998 report, the State Coroner, Derick Hand, recommended changes in police procedure, and that police involved in shootings should be subject to immediate, and mandatory drug and alcohol testing. In June 1998, the Department of Public Prosecutions concluded that there was no reasonable prospect of conviction of either officer, Podesta or Dilorenzo. After a public campaign, led by Levi's estranged widow, the case was reopened. Three Police Integrity Commission hearings were held over eighteen months, in which Jean Pierre Bratanoff-Firgoff's photographs of the incident were used as evidence. While both officers continued to deny any wrongdoing, Podesta resigned in March 1998 and the following year was found guilty of supplying cocaine. Dilorenzo was later sacked from the NSW Police Service in June 1999 as a result of his involvement with known drug dealers.

Bratanoff-Firgoff's photographs of the incident have become iconic, and have been described as "culturally emblematic signifiers" of critical incidents between police and the mentally ill. In 2007, the State Library of New South Wales purchased the photographs, on behalf of the people of New South Wales.
