= Killing of Jesse Deacon =

2023 police shooting in Sydney, Australia

Jesse Deacon, 43, was a mentally ill Australian man who was shot dead by NSW Police in Sydney on 20 July 2023. The incident occurred after an ambulance was called to his home in Glebe following a report that he was self harming; the police attended instead.

Deacon had been struggling with his mental health for much of his life and was holding a 30 cms knife, which was being used on himself, when officers arrived at his home. Police initially tried to use a taser but, when it failed, an officer fired his gun.

== Events following ==
Following the death, which is considered a death in custody, there was an independent enquiry in which the NSW police were urged to improve training given to officers; this enquiry also found that, between 2019 and 2023, 52 people experiencing mental distress died in interactions with the police. It also state that many people experiencing distress are afraid to seek emergency care. There have also been calls for a Royal commission.

Following these events Deacon's mother, Judy Deacon, has become a mental health advocate and is leading protests to demand that police should no longer be sent as first responders in mental health emergencies and that these should only be attended by health professionals. It was noted that police officers receive no mandatory training to respond to people experiencing mental health crises.

Of the loss of her son Judy Deacon says:

I think about him every day and, when I do, my eyes are wet because I’m not a crying person, but my daughter, his sister, is traumatised beyond belief. I refuse to accept the situation until something is done, and that’s when I’ll be able to break down and grieve.

— Judy Deacon, Mother of NSW police shooting victim demands mental health reforms a year after son’s death, The Guardian, 20 July 2024

Judy Deacon also believes that police officers should not carry guns.
