= Coroner's Court of New South Wales =

Specialist court investigating deaths and related incidents in New South Wales

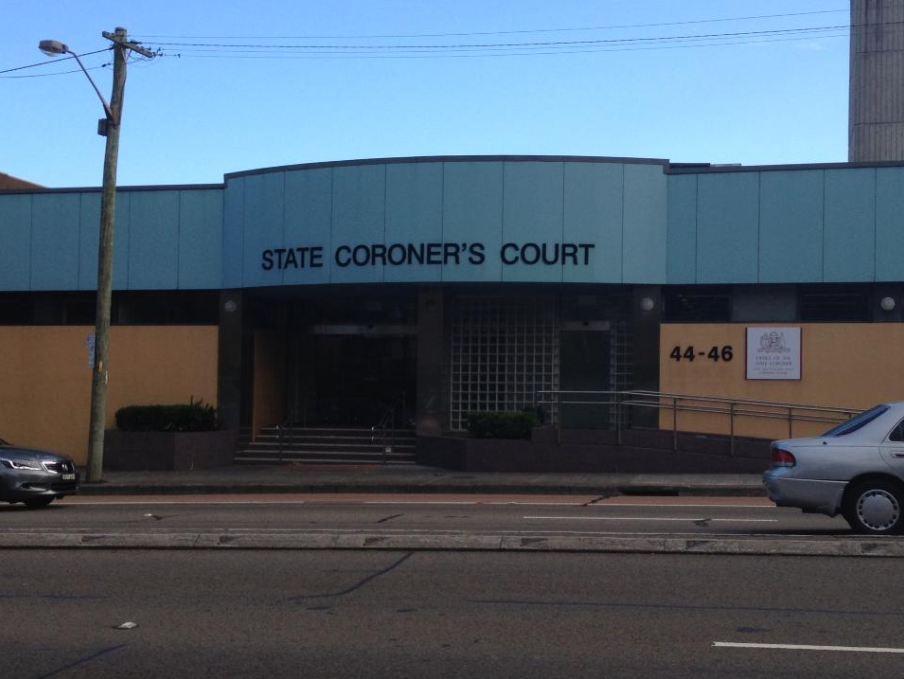
- The façade of the former NSW State Coroner's Court in Glebe, NSW
- Interactive map of Coroner's Court of New South Wales
- 33°52′52″S 151°11′18″E
- Established: 1988
- Jurisdiction: New South Wales
- Location: 1A Main Avenue Lidcombe
- Coordinates: 33°52′52″S 151°11′18″E
- Composition method: Vice-regal appointment upon Premier's nomination, following advice of the Attorney General and Cabinet
- Authorised by: Parliament of New South Wales via the Coroners Act 2009 (NSW)
- Appeals to: Supreme Court of New South Wales
- Judge term length: mandatory retirement by age of 72
- Website: coroners.justice.nsw.gov.au

New South Wales State Coroner
- Currently: Magistrate Teresa O'Sullivan
- Since: 18 December 2018

The Coroner's Court of New South Wales is the court in the Australian state of New South Wales where legal proceedings, in the form of an inquest or inquiry, are held and presided over by the State Coroner of New South Wales (or NSW State Coroner), a Deputy State Coroner of New South Wales, or another coroner of the state of New South Wales.

Coroners must be magistrates in the state and sit in branches of the Local Court of New South Wales. They hold jurisdiction over the remains of a person and have the power to make findings in respect of the cause of death of a person or the cause of any fire in New South Wales.

Generally, there are no appeals from the decision(s) of a coroner; there is, however, provision for the Supreme Court of New South Wales to order a fresh inquest or inquiry or to grant prerogative relief in respect of the proceedings.

== History ==
The office of coroner in New South Wales derives from the legal framework inherited from the historical origins of the state and, ultimately, the United Kingdom. Admiral Arthur Phillip, the first governor of the Colony of New South Wales, was authorised by the British monarch to appoint such officials as were necessary for the administration of justice in the colony. This authority came to Phillip through what is commonly called the "second commission". One of the offices that he could appoint was that of coroner.

In the early days of the colony, the role of the coroner was often performed by a justice of the peace. The first inquiry in the nature of a coronial inquest was conducted on 14 December 1788 and was presided over by Augustus Alt, one of the first justices of the peace appointed by Phillip.

The office of the State Coroner of New South Wales was established in 1988, prior to which the coronial system comprised a City Coroner, a Westmead Coroner (which was preceded by Parramatta, Penrith, and Campbelltown Coroners), and coroners in most New South Wales country towns. After the discovery of asbestos in the file storage area of the Westmead Coroner's Court in 2007, the Westmead Coroner's Court was indefinitely closed. An investigation was conducted following its closure. In 2008, the adjacent Westmead Morgue was closed, largely due to budgetary and sustainability concerns.

The City (or State) Coroner's Court, Lidcombe is located at the Forensic Medicine and Coroners Court complex at 1A Main Avenue, Lidcombe 2141.

== Structure and jurisdiction ==
The Coroner's Court is in the state stream of the Australian court hierarchy, and its operation is defined by state legislation. Per the Coroners Act 2009 (NSW), the State Coroner and Deputy State Coroners are appointed to their office by the Governor of New South Wales and must be magistrates in New South Wales. The Governor may also appoint Coroners and Assistant Coroners, generally, from amongst registrars employed in the New South Wales court system so that coronial services are available in regional areas of New South Wales.

The State Coroner has the function:

- to oversee and coordinate coronial services in the state and to ensure that all deaths, suspected deaths, fires, and explosions over which a coroner has jurisdiction to hold an inquest or inquiry are properly investigated;
- to ensure that an inquest or inquiry is held whenever it is required; and,
- to issue guidelines to coroners to assist them in the exercise or performance of their functions.

Where a serious criminal offence has been disclosed during the course of an inquest or an inquiry, a coroner may terminate the proceedings and must refer that matter to a Director of Public Prosecutions (State or Commonwealth) for consideration of the initiation, or institution, of criminal proceedings.

All magistrates in New South Wales are ex officio coroners by virtue of their appointment as magistrates.

== List of State Coroners ==
Prior to the creation of the office of the State Coroner in 1988, coronial inquests were conducted by the Sydney City Coroner for greater metropolitan Sydney, and across New South Wales by magistrates in the Local Court as ex-officio coroners. The original Coroner's Court building was in George Street North, in The Rocks, Sydney. The Coroner's Court building and morgue moved to the current location at Glebe in the early 1970s.

Title	Name	Term began	Term ended	Time in office	Notes
Coroner for Sydney	George Milner Slade	19 October 1821			
Coroner for Sydney	Charles Thomas Smeathman	January 1830	16 January 1835		
Coroner for Sydney	John Ryan Brenan	3 February 1835	1856		
Coroner for Sydney	John Skottowe Parker	28 May 1856	10 July 1866		
Coroner for Sydney	Henry Shiell	4 August 1866	30 January 1889		
Coroner for Sydney	John Chadwick Woore	31 January 1889	30 November 1903		
Coroner for Sydney	A. N. (Arthur Nelson) Barnett	23 February 1904	31 July 1907		
Coroner for Sydney	J. L. King	1 August 1907			
Coroner for Sydney	Stephen Murphy	1 January 1909			
Coroner for Sydney	Henry Storry Hawkins	20 November 1911	31 October 1919		
Coroner for Sydney	John Jamieson	1 November 1919	17 June 1925		
Coroner for Sydney	Harry Ferdinand William Fletcher	18 June 1925	6 May 1928		
Coroner for Sydney	Edwin Alfred May	7 May 1928	7 August 1932		
Coroner for Sydney	Herbert Howell Farrington	8 August 1932	4 January 1935		
Coroner for Sydney	Edward Thompson Oram	7 January 1935	22 August 1943		
Coroner for Sydney	John Alexander Harris	23 August 1943	7 January 1945		
Coroner for Sydney	Reginald Gordon Cookson	8 January 1945	1 January 1946		
Coroner for Sydney	Roy Mitchell Stewart	2 January 1946	1 June 1947		
Coroner for Sydney	James Byrne	2 June 1947			
State Coroner	Kevin Waller AM	1988	1992	3–4 years	
State Coroner	Greg Glass	1992	1995	2–3 years	
State Coroner	Derrick Hand	1995	2000	4–5 years	
State Coroner	John Abernethy	2000	2007	6–7 years	
State Coroner	Mary Jerram	2007	2013	5–6 years	
State Coroner	Michael Barnes	6 January 2014	30 November 2017	3 years, 328 days	
State Coroner	Leslie Mabbutt	1 April 2018	14 December 2018	257 days	
State Coroner	Teresa O'Sullivan	(acting) 15 December 2018	14 July 2019	211 days	
State Coroner	Teresa O'Sullivan	15 July 2019	current	7 years, 130 days	

== Notable inquests ==
- 1963 Bogle–Chandler case
- 1977 murder of Donald Mackay
- 1979 Sydney Ghost Train fire
- 1985 suspected murder of Christopher Dale Flannery
- 1986 murder of Sallie-Anne Huckstepp
- Bowraville murders
- 1994 Disappearance of Revelle Balmain
- Sydney siege inquest following the 2014 Sydney hostage crisis
- 2020 disappearance of Melissa Caddick
- 2020 disappearance of MH370 journalist Ean Higgins

== See also ==
- List of coroners courts in Australia
- List of New South Wales courts and tribunals
- Old Coroner's Court, The Rocks
