= Julie Bishop =

Australian politician (born 1956)

The Honourable Julie Bishop
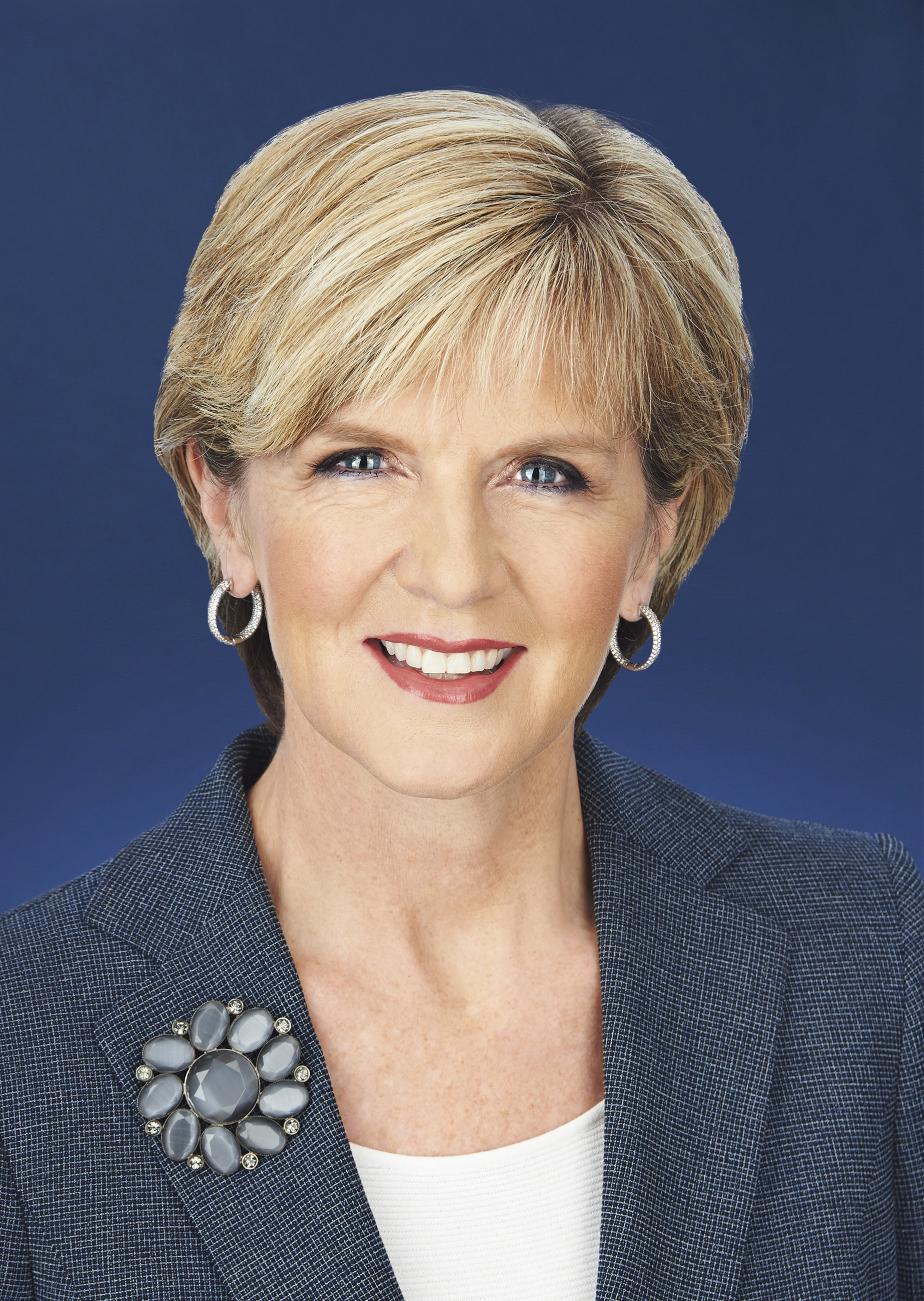
- Official portrait, 2016

United Nations Special Envoy on Myanmar
- Incumbent
- Assumed office 6 April 2024
- Secretary-General: António Guterres
- Preceded by: Noeleen Heyzer

Chancellor of Australian National University
- In office 1 January 2020 – 7 May 2026
- Preceded by: Gareth Evans
- Succeeded by: Larry Marshall (acting)

Minister for Foreign Affairs
- In office 18 September 2013 – 28 August 2018
- Prime Minister: Tony Abbott; Malcolm Turnbull; Scott Morrison
- Preceded by: Bob Carr
- Succeeded by: Marise Payne

Deputy Leader of the Liberal Party
- In office 29 November 2007 – 24 August 2018
- Leader: Brendan Nelson; Malcolm Turnbull; Tony Abbott; Malcolm Turnbull
- Preceded by: Peter Costello
- Succeeded by: Josh Frydenberg

Deputy Leader of the Opposition
- In office 3 December 2007 – 18 September 2013
- Leader: Brendan Nelson; Malcolm Turnbull; Tony Abbott
- Preceded by: Julia Gillard
- Succeeded by: Tanya Plibersek

Minister for Education and Science
- In office 27 January 2006 – 3 December 2007
- Prime Minister: John Howard
- Preceded by: Brendan Nelson
- Succeeded by: Julia Gillard

Minister Assisting the Prime Minister for Women's Issues
- In office 27 January 2006 – 3 December 2007
- Prime Minister: John Howard
- Preceded by: Kay Patterson
- Succeeded by: Tanya Plibersek

Minister for Ageing
- In office 7 October 2003 – 27 January 2006
- Prime Minister: John Howard
- Preceded by: Kevin Andrews
- Succeeded by: Santo Santoro

Member of the Australian Parliament for Curtin
- In office 3 October 1998 – 11 April 2019
- Preceded by: Allan Rocher
- Succeeded by: Celia Hammond

Senator for Murdoch University
- In office 12 May 1997 – 3 October 1998
- Nominated by: George Lodge
- Appointed by: Ronald Wilson

Director of the Special Broadcasting Service
- In office 1997–1998
- Preceded by: Brian Johns
- Succeeded by: Carla Zampatti

Personal details
- Born: Julie Isabel Bishop; 17 July 1956 (age 70) Lobethal, South Australia
- Party: Liberal
- Spouse: Neil Gillon (m. 1983–1988)
- Education: University of Adelaide

Julie Isabel Bishop (born 17 July 1956) is an Australian former politician who served as Minister for Foreign Affairs from 2013 to 2018 and deputy leader of the Liberal Party from 2007 to 2018. She was the member of parliament (MP) for Curtin from 1998 to 2019. She Served as the chancellor of the Australian National University from January 2020 to her early resignation in May 2026.

Bishop was born in Lobethal, South Australia, and studied law at the University of Adelaide. Prior to entering politics she worked as a commercial lawyer in Perth, Western Australia; she was the local managing partner of Clayton Utz. She was a delegate to the 1998 constitutional convention, and also served as a director of the Special Broadcasting Service (SBS) and as a member of the Murdoch University senate. Bishop was elected to parliament at the 1998 federal election, representing the Division of Curtin in Perth's western suburbs. In the Howard government, she served as Minister for Ageing (2003–2006), Minister for Education and Science (2006–2007), and Minister for Women (2006–2007).

After the Coalition lost the 2007 election, Bishop was elected deputy leader of the Liberal Party. She was the first woman to hold the position, and was re-elected to the post at multiple leadership spills following her initial election. During her time as deputy, there were three different Liberal leaders—Brendan Nelson, Malcolm Turnbull, and Tony Abbott. When the Coalition returned to power at the 2013 election, Bishop was appointed Minister for Foreign Affairs in the Abbott government. She was Australia's first female foreign minister. Issues that arose during her tenure included changes to the Australian foreign aid program, the international military intervention against ISIL, the shooting down of Malaysia Airlines Flight 17, and the execution of Australian citizens by Indonesia.

In August 2018, Peter Dutton challenged Turnbull for the leadership of the Liberal Party, due to dissatisfaction from the party's conservative wing. Turnbull defeated Dutton in a leadership ballot, but tensions continued to mount and the party voted in favour of holding a second spill; Bishop chose to be a candidate. In the second vote, Bishop was eliminated in the first round by Peter Dutton and Scott Morrison, with Morrison elected as party leader (and thus prime minister) in the second round. She declined to retain the foreign affairs portfolio in the Morrison Ministry, instead moving to the backbench. Bishop announced her retirement from politics on 21 February 2019. This took effect on 11 April when Morrison called the federal election and Parliament was prorogued.

Julie Bishop commenced her term as chancellor of the Australian National University in January 2020, and was expected to complete this term in December 2026. On May 7, 2026, Bishop resigned her post as Chancellor of the university 7 months early citing concerns over the legality of the actions of the Tertiary Education Quality and Standards Agency in regards to the hiring of her successor to the role of chancellor.

In April 2024 Bishop was appointed United Nations special envoy for Myanmar.

== Early life ==
Bishop was born on 17 July 1956 in Lobethal, South Australia. She is the third of four children born to Isabel Mary (née Wilson) and Douglas Alan Bishop; she has two older sisters and a younger brother. Bishop has described her parents as "classic Menzies Liberals". Her father was a returned soldier and orchardist, while her mother's family were sheep and wheat farmers. Both her mother and grandfather William Bishop were active in local government, serving terms as mayor of the East Torrens District Council.

Bishop grew up on an apple and cherry orchard in Basket Range. The year before she was born, it was burned to the ground in the Black Sunday bushfires. Bishop began her education at Basket Range Primary School and later attended St Peter's Collegiate Girls' School in Adelaide. She was the head prefect in her final year. Bishop went on to study law at the University of Adelaide. She worked two part-time jobs as a barmaid while at university—one at Football Park and one at a pub in Uraidla. She graduated with a Bachelor of Laws degree in 1978.

== Professional career ==
After graduating law school, Bishop joined Wallmans, an Adelaide-based law firm, as its first female articled clerk. She left after less than a year, in part due to an incident where a senior partner asked her to perform waitressing duties. In 1982, aged 26, she became a partner in the firm of Mangan, Ey & Bishop. The following year, she married West Australian property developer Neil Gillon, and moved to Perth.

On arriving in WA, Bishop joined Robinson Cox as a solicitor specialising in commercial litigation and was made a full partner in 1985. According to Kerry Stokes, "in the legal profession she was a very determined, reasoned person [...] there's not been much written about what a good executive Julie was—responsible for administering and running a partnership, not just a lawyer".

In the late 1980s, Robinson Cox was hired by CSR Limited to defend against compensation claims brought by asbestos mining workers, who had contracted mesothelioma while working for Midalco, a subsidiary of CSR. Bishop was part of the team assigned to the case, which developed an argument that a company was not legally responsible for the actions of its subsidiaries. The Supreme Court of Western Australia eventually decided to pierce the corporate veil and hold CSR liable for Midalco's actions; the lead litigant died before the conclusion of the case, which lasted eight months. After becoming a public figure, Bishop was accused by opponents of acting immorally by involving herself in the case. She has said she conducted herself ethically and professionally, and per procedural advice given by barristers Robert French and David Malcolm (both future judges).

As a legal advisor to the Western Australian Development Corporation, Bishop assisted in the incorporation of several new government enterprises, including Gold Corporation (the operator of the Perth Mint), LandCorp, and Eventscorp (a division of Tourism Western Australia). Robinson Cox merged into the larger firm of Clayton Utz in 1992, and she was made managing partner of the firm's Perth office in 1994. In the same year, she took up an appointment as chair of the state government's Town Planning Appeal Tribunal, serving a three-year term. In 1996, Bishop attended Harvard Business School for eight weeks to complete the Advanced Management Programme for senior managers. She has credited one of her lecturers there, George C. Lodge, with inspiring her to enter public life. In 1997, she was elected to the senate of Murdoch University and appointed as a director of the Special Broadcasting Service (SBS).

== Early political involvement ==
Bishop joined the Liberal Party in 1992. She has credited the WA Inc scandal with making her think she "did not ever want to see a Labor government elected again". She was chosen as the president of the Liberal party's CBD branch the year she joined the party, serving until 1997. In 1998, Senator Nick Minchin invited her to serve as an appointed delegate to the 1998 national constitutional convention. She was a "minimalist republican", and voted against the final model because she considered it too radical and unlikely to succeed at a referendum. At the convention, she became acquainted with Peter Costello, at the time serving as Treasurer under John Howard.

== Howard government ==
=== First years in parliament ===
Prior to the 1998 federal election, Bishop won Liberal preselection for the Division of Curtin, which takes in Perth's western suburbs. Her preselection bid received the support of Premier Richard Court, who had earmarked her as a future member of federal cabinet. The seat had been held for 17 years by Allan Rocher, who was a personal friend of Prime Minister John Howard but had left the Liberals in 1995 to sit as an independent. Howard did not want the Liberals to run a candidate against Rocher, and refused to campaign for Bishop; however, Peter Costello and Alexander Downer both supported her candidacy and Costello launched her campaign. At the election, she reclaimed the seat for the Liberals with a large swing in her favour.

After the Liberal Party lost the 2001 state election in Western Australia, Bishop was suggested by multiple media sources as a possible replacement for Richard Court as state Liberal leader (and thus Leader of the Opposition). It was later confirmed that Court favoured an arrangement where he and his deputy and factional rival, Colin Barnett, would resign their seats in the Legislative Assembly. Bishop would resign from federal Parliament and hand her seat to Barnett, and Court would hand the leadership of the WA Liberals to Bishop once she was safely in the state legislature by way of winning either Court or Barnett's old seats, both of which were within Curtin's boundaries and were comfortably safe for the Liberals. However, Bishop eventually rejected the deal.

=== Elevation to the ministry ===
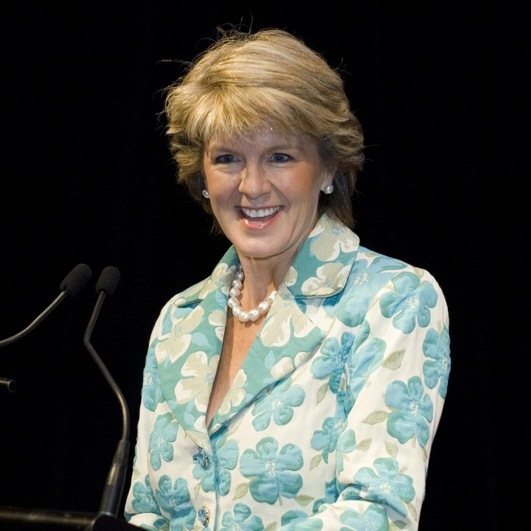
Bishop while Education Minister in 2007

Bishop was appointed Minister for Ageing by Prime Minister John Howard in 2003. She was later promoted to Minister for Education and Science and Minister for Women in 2006 and served in those positions until the defeat of the Howard government at the 2007 federal election.

As education minister, Bishop's policies centred on the development of national education standards as well as performance-based pay for teachers. On 13 April 2007, the Australian State Governments jointly expressed opposition to Bishop's pay policy. In the 2007 budget, the Federal Government announced a $5 billion "endowment fund" for higher education, with the expressed goal of providing world-class tertiary institutions in Australia. Some of Bishop's public comments on education, including the remark that "the states have ideologically hijacked school syllabi and are wasting $180 million in unnecessary duplication", were criticised by teachers. An advance media kit for a 2006 speech claimed parts of the contemporary curriculum came "straight from Chairman Mao"; the remark was dropped from her speech.

== Deputy Leader of the Opposition ==
Following the 2007 election, Bishop was elected Deputy Leader of the Liberal Party on 29 November 2007; Brendan Nelson was elected Leader. In a ballot of Liberal Party room members, Bishop comfortably won with 44 votes, one more than the combined total of her two competitors, Andrew Robb (with 25 votes) and Christopher Pyne (with 18 votes).

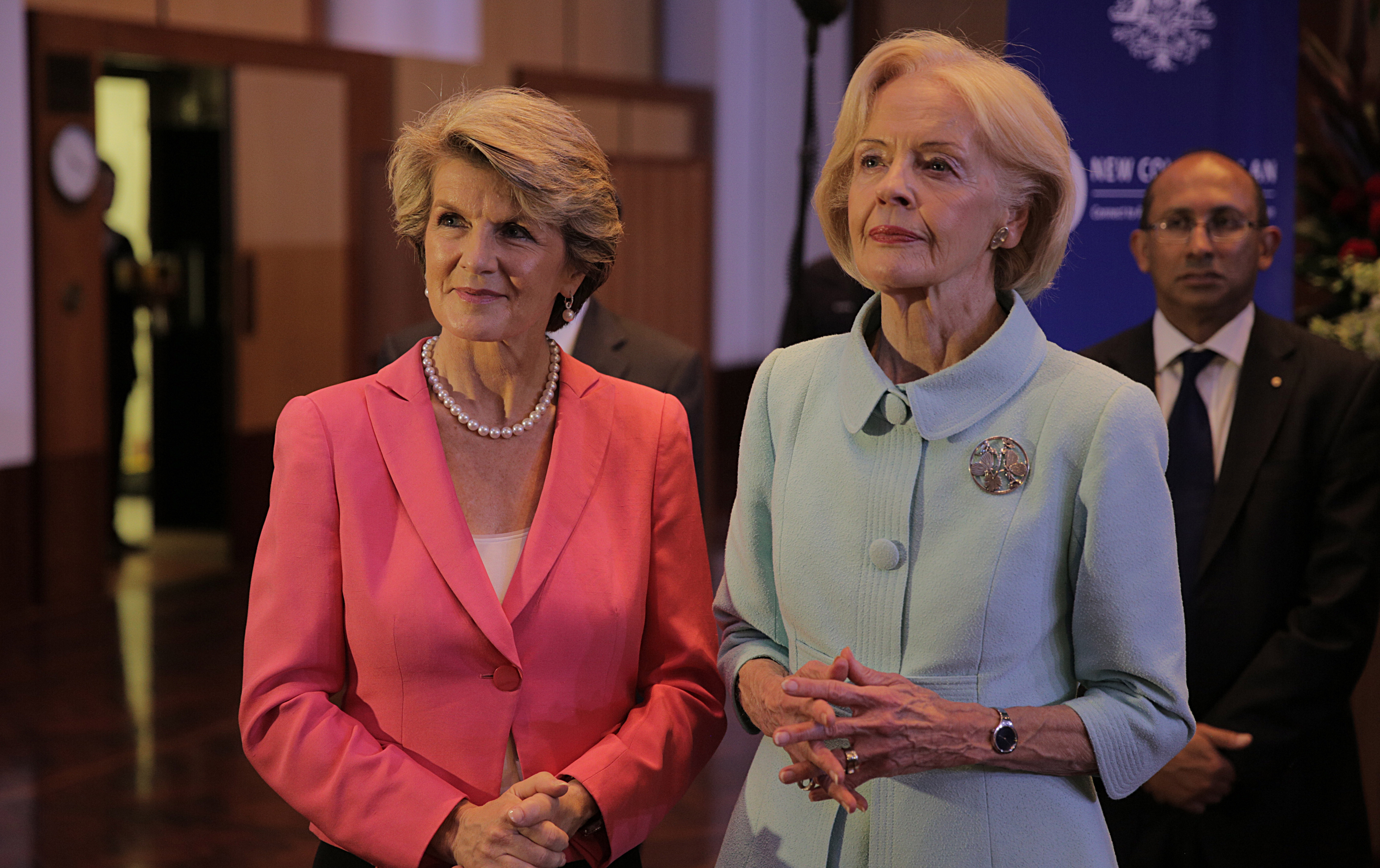
Bishop with Governor-General Quentin Bryce

On 22 September 2008, Bishop was promoted to the role of Shadow Treasurer by Nelson's successor as Opposition Leader, Malcolm Turnbull, making her the first woman to hold that portfolio. On 16 February 2009, however, she was moved from that position, with widespread media speculation that her colleagues were dissatisfied with her performance in the role. She was instead given the job of Shadow Minister for Foreign Affairs. After Tony Abbott was elected Liberal Leader following the 2009 leadership spill, Bishop retained her roles as Deputy Leader and Shadow Minister for Foreign Affairs.

In 2010, Bishop defended the suspected forgery of Australian passports by Mossad, saying that many countries practised the forging of passports for intelligence operations, including Australia. The Rudd government attacked Bishop over the statements, saying she had "broken a long-standing convention" of not speculating about intelligence practices. She later clarified her statement, saying, "I have no knowledge of any Australian authority forging any passports of any nation."

Following the Coalition's narrow loss in the 2010 federal election, Bishop was re-elected unanimously as Deputy Leader by her colleagues and retained the position of Shadow Minister for Foreign Affairs, while also being given the additional responsibility of Shadow Minister for Trade.

== Minister for Foreign Affairs ==
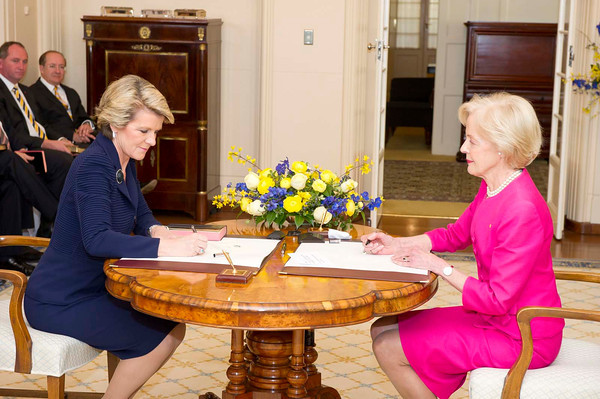
Bishop being sworn in as Foreign Minister by Quentin Bryce at Government House in 2013

After the Coalition won the 2013 federal election, new Prime Minister Tony Abbott confirmed Bishop as Minister for Foreign Affairs; she was sworn in by Governor-General Quentin Bryce on 18 September 2013. She became the only female member of the cabinet and was given the third-highest rank, after Abbott and Deputy Prime Minister Warren Truss. In the months following her appointment several media reports claimed that Bishop, along with Social Services Minister Scott Morrison, were regarded internally as the best performing ministers in the Government.

In December 2014, Bishop became only the second woman to serve as acting prime minister, after Julia Gillard. Throughout her tenure as foreign minister, Bishop had been frequently tipped by political commentators as a possible future leader of the Liberal Party and prime minister.

=== Foreign aid ===
One of Bishop's first steps after being appointed Minister for Foreign Affairs was to introduce sweeping changes to the Australian foreign aid program. These changes included abolition of the Australian foreign aid agency, AusAID, and extensive expenditure cuts.

The new government was sworn into office on 18 September 2013. Incoming Prime Minister Tony Abbott announced the same day that AusAID would be integrated into the Department of Foreign Affairs (DFAT). The news of the proposed integration had been conveyed by Bishop to senior AusAID staff some days earlier. The official explanation for the integration of AusAID into DFAT was that “Integration will enable DFAT to better pursue Australia's national interests by ensuring closer alignment and mutually reinforcing linkages among the Government's aid, foreign affairs and trade efforts.”

The impact of the integration on the quality of Australia's aid program led to considerable debate. Sceptics pointed to the departure of a considerable number of experienced aid professionals from the former AusAID while the process of integration was taking place and argued that the culture and priorities of DFAT were not supportive of a quality aid program. Those in favour of the change argued that closer alignment with foreign affairs would ensure that the aid program was more relevant and would provide better value for money.

Subsequently, Bishop announced substantial expenditure cuts in the aid program. In Opposition, the Liberal Party had publicly endorsed the aim of maintaining the Australian aid budget at the level of 0.5% of GDP. Aid spending amounted to around $5.0 billion in 2014/15. However budget cuts introduced after the new government took office led to marked reductions. Expenditure was reduced to around $4.2 billion in 2015/16. Further reductions were introduced in following years. Aid spending as a share of GDP fell from 0.32% in 2014/15 to an estimated 0.23% in 2018/19.

=== New Colombo Plan ===
Months after the Abbott government took office, Bishop announced the implementation of a New Colombo Plan which would provide undergraduate students with funding to study in several different locations within the Indo-Pacific. The plan started off in pilot form and after initial success the full program was rolled out in 2015.

=== ISIS fighters ===
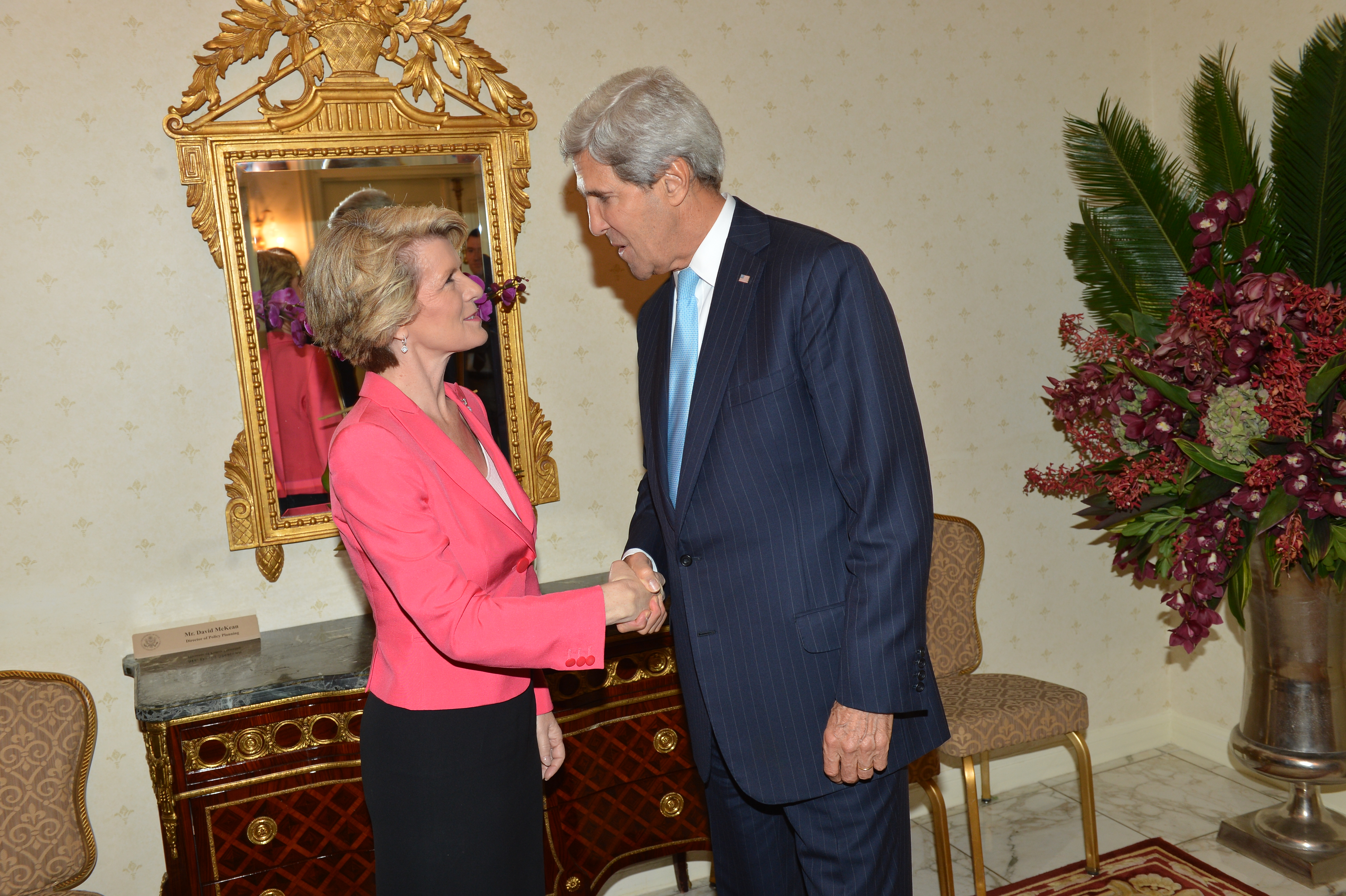
Bishop with US Secretary of State John Kerry

In a 2015 speech explaining the Australian Government's measures against ISIS, Bishop compared the psychological underpinnings of ISIS with that of Nazism. Citing Eric Hoffer's seminal work The True Believer, she argued that the declared Caliphate drew from the same source that drove the masses to support Hitler; "Invincibility was—until the US-led airstrikes—all part of its attraction."

In October 2014, Man Haron Monis wrote to Attorney-General George Brandis asking if Monis could contact the leader of ISIS, two months before he took hostages in the Sydney siege. On 28 May 2015, Bishop told Parliament that the letter was provided to a review of the siege, before correcting the record three days later.

=== UN Security Council ===
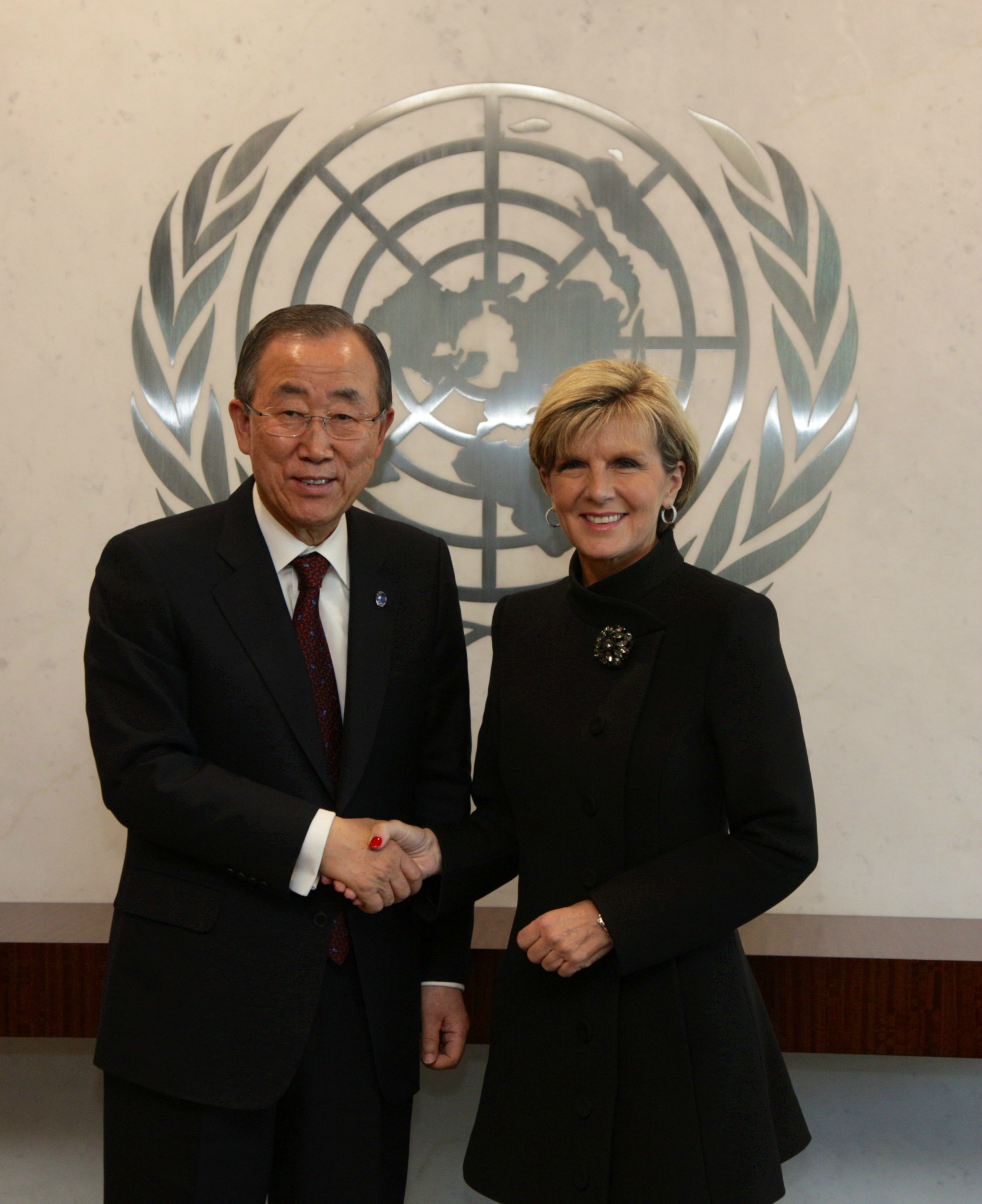
Bishop meeting United Nations Secretary-General Ban Ki-moon in November 2014

Although Bishop fought against the Gillard government's campaign to gain Australia a temporary two-year seat on the United Nations Security Council, she was widely lauded for her commanding performance when representing Australia on the Council in her capacity as Foreign Minister. She negotiated a successful resolution that was adopted by the Council in regards to gaining full access to the crash site of Flight MH17.

During the month of November 2014, Bishop chaired the Security Council and led meeting to discuss the threat of foreign fights, UN peacekeeping and the Ebola epidemic. Later, Bishop led negotiations to pass a resolution to set up an independent criminal tribunal into the downing of Flight MH17. Although Russia vetoed the resolution, Bishop was widely praised by other delegates for her work and for her strong statement following the veto that "the anticipated excuses and obfuscation by the Russian Federation should be treated with the utmost disdain".

=== Iran ===
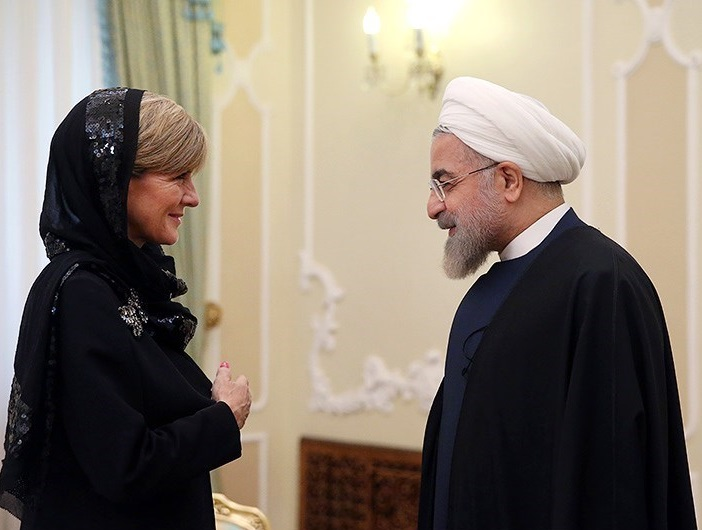
Bishop with Iranian President Hassan Rouhani in Saadabad Palace

In April 2015, Bishop paid an official visit to Iran, following the conclusion of a visit to India. She was the first Australian government minister to visit the country since 2003, having been personally invited by Iran's foreign minister, Mohammad Javad Zarif. They discussed the proposed nuclear deal and issues relating to Iranian asylum seekers in Australia. Bishop wore a headscarf or a hat for the duration of her visit, and did not shake hands with male dignitaries in order to avoid offending local sensibilities. She received some criticism for doing so, with Andrew Bolt rhetorically asking whether she should have "subjugated herself" to Islamic law. Head coverings are not mandatory for foreign women visiting Iran. In response, she said: "As a matter of fact I wear scarves and hats and headgear quite often as part of my everyday wear".

=== Myanmar ===
In early September 2017, as the Rohingya crisis in Myanmar became ethnic cleansing, Bishop said that Australia was deeply concerned by the escalating violence in Myanmar's Rakhine State and would provide up to A$5 million to help Rohingya refugees in Bangladesh. In 2018, Bishop called "for an end to the violence, for full and unhindered humanitarian access … and a full and transparent accountability of the human rights abuses". She also said that Australia's relationship with Myanmar Army "is designed to help promote positive change in Myanmar".

=== Indonesia ===
Bishop was involved at the highest level of negotiations with the Indonesian Government in attempts to save the lives of convicted drug smugglers Myuran Sukumaran and Andrew Chan. Demonstrating Australia's opposition to the death penalty, Bishop was widely applauded for the manner in which she conducted negotiations. This was in stark contrast to the criticism faced by Tony Abbott who was ridiculed for remarks he made in regards to foreign aid provided by Australia to Indonesia. Despite the Government's efforts, both Chan and Sukumaran were executed in April 2015. As a result of the executions, Bishop recalled the Australian Ambassador from Indonesia in condemnation of their decision.

By August 2015, Bishop stated that Australia's relationship with Indonesia was "back on track" after privately meeting with the Indonesian Foreign Minister to discuss the fallout from the executions.

=== China ===
In May 2018, Geoff Raby, a former Australian Ambassador to China, criticised Bishop's handling of Australia–China relations, stating she had neglected the relationship between the countries and had angered Chinese leaders with "strident public comments on the South China Sea" and a speech questioning China's regional leadership. He called on Malcolm Turnbull to "replace the Foreign Minister with someone better equipped for the demands of the job". In response, Bishop said that Raby was "profoundly ignorant [...] about the level of engagement between Australia and China at present and the state of the relationship", and that he had not spoken to her or her office in several years. Turnbull said the opinion piece was "utterly wrong" and described Bishop as "a formidable foreign minister, a great diplomat and a great colleague".

=== Resignation and replacement ===
On 26 August 2018, Bishop issued a statement indicating that she would resign as Minister for Foreign Affairs. She was replaced by Senator Marise Payne on 28 August.

== Liberal leadership issues ==
=== February 2015 leadership spill ===
In February 2015, in response to rising criticisms of his leadership, Tony Abbott called a spill of leadership positions. Both Julie Bishop and Communications Minister Malcolm Turnbull were reported by the media as considering challenging for the leadership. Opinion poll results consistently showed that both Bishop and Turnbull were preferred by the public to Abbott. Eventually a motion to move a leadership spill fell by 61 votes to 39, and Abbott consequentially remained in office.

=== September 2015 leadership spill ===
On 14 September 2015, Malcolm Turnbull challenged Tony Abbott for the leadership of the Liberal Party. After Turnbull was elected, Bishop defeated a challenge from Kevin Andrews to retain her position as Deputy Leader by 70 votes to 30. Hours before Turnbull's challenge, Bishop had visited Abbott to advise him he had lost the confidence of the Parliamentary Liberal Party. She is said to have intended to vote for Abbott in the leadership vote until he declared her position vacant as well as his, after which she voted for Turnbull. Bishop was retained as Foreign Minister following the formation of the Turnbull government.

=== August 2018 leadership spills ===
On 21 August 2018, Malcolm Turnbull called a leadership spill and defeated challenger Peter Dutton by 48 votes to 35. The deputy leadership was also declared vacant, with Bishop re-elected as deputy leader unopposed. Over the following days, there was widespread speculation about a second spill being called, and multiple media outlets reported on 23 August that Bishop would be a candidate for the leadership if that eventuated. A second spill was called on 24 August, and Bishop was eliminated on the first ballot with 11 votes out of 85 (or 12.9 percent). Morrison was elected leader over Dutton on the second ballot, and Josh Frydenberg was chosen as deputy leader. Bishop is the first woman to formally stand for the leadership of the Liberal Party, and only the second woman to stand for the leadership of one of Australia's two major parties, after the Labor Party's Julia Gillard.

== Political positions ==
Bishop is regarded as a being a moderate within the Liberal Party, and has been described as holding similar views to Malcolm Turnbull. She has stated that she regards herself a "very liberal-minded person", an "economic dry and a social liberal", and a "Menzian Liberal".

Bishop is in favour of an Australian republic, having served as a delegate at the Constitutional Convention of 1998. When a conscience vote has been allowed by the Liberal Party, Bishop has always voted in a "progressive" manner, voting in favour of allowing stem cell research and for removing ministerial oversight of the abortion pill RU486.

=== Same-sex marriage ===
During the internal debate on same-sex marriage which divided the Liberal Party in August 2015, Bishop refused to publicly declare her personal views on the matter. However, her statement that she was "very liberally minded" on the topic was taken by many to be an allusion towards support of same-sex marriage. In a television interview in November 2015, Bishop confirmed that she supported same-sex marriage.

In August 2015, Bishop spoke in favour of holding a plebiscite on the matter, believing that the issue should be put to a democratic vote so that it could no longer distract from the government's policy agenda. This ultimately became the policy adopted by the government. Following the postal plebiscite in 2017, which resulted in a "Yes" vote, Bishop stated that she had voted in support of same-sex marriage.

== Retirement and later life ==
=== Chancellor of the Australian National University ===
Following her retirement from political life, Bishop took up a position on the board of the professional services company Palladium. In January 2020, Bishop took up the position of chancellor of Australian National University (ANU) succeeding Gareth Evans. She was to be the university's first female chancellor.

In August 2025, controversy arose when, during a senate inquiry into university governance, Bishop was accused of bullying and harassment by several members of the ANU community, including academic Dr Liz Allen, and president of the ANUSA student association, Will Burfoot. In response to the accusations, Bishop released a statement to media outlets expressing that she "rejects any suggestion that [she] engaged with Council members, staff, students and observers in any way other than with respect, courtesy and civility." A day later, ACT senator David Pocock, who was part of the senate committee, called for Bishop to stand aside, stating that there are "serious problems at the ANU ... and I think we should expect better." Following Pocock's comments, education minister Jason Clare announced that he would appoint an independent investigator to examine the claims. An ANU spokesperson also released a statement, saying that "a number of statements in the testimony before the Senate hearing [were] factually incorrect." In October, it was announced that former inspector-general of intelligence and security, Vivienne Thom, would be appointed to investigate the bullying claims.

Later in August, a collective of ANU music students threatened legal action against Bishop, stating that the ANU's controversial Renew ANU money saving plan goes against section 5(1)(d) of the ANU act, that the university must "provide facilities and courses at a higher education level and other levels in the visual and performing arts, and, in doing so, promote the highest standards of practice in those fields."

When it was announced that ANU Vice chancellor Genevieve Bell would be resigning, many calls came from the ANU community for Bishop to step down as well (including a petition signed by more than 200 staff and students.). However, in an interview with ABC Radio Canberra, Bishop stated that she believed she was receiving positive feedback, that no one was calling for her resignation, and that she would stay in her role until her term ends in 2026. Rather than appearing at the Senate inquiry, Bishop chose to respond in a letter, accusing the inquiry and senator Pocock of exposing Dr Allen and viewers to psychological harm. Dr Allen is a free agent and chose to speak up against the toxic culture within the ANU council. In the 25 page letter, Bishop also accused senator Pocock of not appropriately informing her of the bullying allegations, and claimed that the Senate inquiry, in which the allegations were first brought up, did not have "appropriate trauma-informed principles." Senator Pocock had raised the workplace grievances with Genevieve Bell in a letter sent on 25 June 2025.

Renew ANU was initially introduced as a plan to save $250m by 2026, and resulted in extensive cuts to the university, including to staff, courses, and entire departments. Reporting in early 2026, however, indicated that the reported financial deficit cited as the rationale for such drastic budget slashes across the university were likely overstated. The minutes of an ANU council meeting from February 18, 2026, reported a $45 million operating deficit for the university, in contrast to the $110 deficit predicted at the launch of the Renew ANU project.

On the 8th of May 2026, Bishop officially resigned from her role as ANU chancellor reportedly citing concerns over the involvement of the Tertiary Education Quality and Standards Agency in the aftermath of the departure of former Vice Chancellor Genevieve Bell and the agency's oversight during the run-up to hiring the next university chancellor. At the time of her resignation, Bishop had 7 months remaining in her term as chancellor.

=== G7 and United Nations ===
When the United Kingdom assumed the presidency of the G7 in 2021, Bishop was appointed by the country's Minister for Women and Equalities Liz Truss to a newly formed Gender Equality Advisory Council (GEAC) chaired by Sarah Sands. From 2021 to 2022, she was a member of the Trilateral Commission’s Task Force on Global Capitalism in Transition, chaired by Carl Bildt, Kelly Grier and Takeshi Niinami. In early March 2023 it was announced that she had signed on to speak at a series of leadership events in Sydney and Melbourne with former president of the United States Barack Obama. Later that month Bishop joined luxury Australian department store David Jones in a brand ambassador role.

On 6 April 2024 Bishop was appointed to the role of United Nations special envoy to Myanmar by secretary-general Antonio Guterres, succeeding Noeleen Heyzer in this role.

However, concerns about her role were raised in an open letter by almost 300 companies, calling for the UN to publicly investigate Bishop after she refused to disclose her financial details. The letter alleged that Bishop, through her consulting firm, Julie Bishop & Partners, has financial relationships with several mining and Chinese state-owned companies who exploit conflicts and human rights in Myanmar, and was therefore unsuitable for the role. A spokesperson for Julie Bishop & Partners released a statement, saying that "on no occasion has Ms Bishop engaged nor would she do so in any activities, nor does she hold any interests that conflict with her commitments to the UN or the ANU."

=== Consulting work ===
Following her retirement from parliament, Bishop established consulting firm "Julie Bishop & Partners". It was reported in January 2020 that Bishop had taken up a position with the UK financial firm Greensill Capital in December 2019 to provide strategic advice to Greensill and serve as chair of Greensill Asia Pacific as the company accelerated its expansion in the region. Lex Greensill, the founder of Greensill Capital, said that the company would "draw on Julie's unparalleled experience and expertise -- particularly her international credentials cemented during five years as Australia's foreign minister."

Over a year later, a scandal involving Greensill emerged in the United Kingdom. In April 2021 it was reported in the Financial Times and The Sunday Times that former UK prime minister David Cameron had been involved in lobbying activities within the UK government on behalf of Greensill. Shortly afterwards, it was reported in the Australian Financial Review that as part of Bishop's consulting activities with Greensill Capital in early 2020, she had attended meetings in Davos in Switzerland organised by Lex Greensill. In the meetings in Davos, Bishop joined with David Cameron to meet Lex Greensill to discuss the affairs of the company. In Davos, she and Lex Greensill also reportedly met the then-Australian finance minister Mathias Cormann. Cormann, who in March 2021 was elected as Secretary-General of the OECD, is reported to have said that he was asked by Bishop to meet with Lex Greensill and David Cameron. These meetings in Davos took place shortly after Bishop had taken up her position as Chancellor of the ANU. Bishop's activities with Greensill in Davos were reportedly arranged "in the margins" of an ANU function for Australians and Australian businesses in Davos. In June, it was reported that Australian Treasury officials had confirmed to an Australian Senate committee that Bishop had lobbied Australian Treasurer Josh Frydenberg on behalf of Greensill and that Labor Party members of the Australian Parliamentary Committee on Corporations and Financial Services were pressing to have Bishop called before the committee for questioning. In connection with Bishop's connections with Greensill, the Australian Attorney General's Department confirmed that the department had written to Bishop seeking clarification of her role at Greensill at the time that she contacted Frydenberg's office on behalf of the company.

== Personal life ==
Bishop was married to property developer Neil Gillon from 1983 to 1988, taking his surname for the duration of the marriage. She later had relationships with Senator Ross Lightfoot and former Lord Mayor of Perth Peter Nattrass. She was in a relationship with businessman David Panton from 2014 to 2022.

Bishop does not have children. In response to repeated media inquiries about the subject, she has stated that "I'm not having kids, there's no point lamenting what was or what could have been", and that she feels "incredibly lucky that I've had the kind of career that is so consuming that I don't feel I have a void in my life".

== Legacy ==
In July 2021, Mattel created a Julie Bishop Barbie doll "for her trailblazing political career."

== Honours ==
Foreign honours

- (Netherlands) 5 September 2014: Commander of the Order of Merit, Ministry of Foreign Affairs
- 24 October 2018: US Mission Award for Leadership Excellence, United States Mission, Australia
- (Japan) 29 April 2024: Grand Cordon of the Order of the Rising Sun

== See also ==
- List of Harvard University politicians

Parliament of Australia
| Preceded by Allan Rocher | Member for Curtin; 1998–2019 | Succeeded by Celia Hammond |
Political offices
| Preceded by Kevin Andrews | Minister for Ageing; 2003–2006 | Succeeded by Santo Santoro |
| Preceded by Brendan Nelson | Minister for Education and Science; 2006–2007 | Succeeded by Julia Gillard |
| Preceded by Kay Patterson | Minister for Women; 2006–2007 | Succeeded by Tanya Plibersek |
| Preceded by Julia Gillard | Deputy Leader of the Opposition; 2007–2013 | Succeeded by Tanya Plibersek |
| Preceded by Malcolm Turnbull | Shadow Treasurer of Australia; 2008–2009 | Succeeded by Joe Hockey |
| Preceded by Bob Carr | Minister for Foreign Affairs; 2013–2018 | Succeeded by Marise Payne |
Party political offices
| Preceded by Peter Costello | Deputy Leader of the Liberal Party; 2007–2018 | Succeeded by Josh Frydenberg |
