= Man Haron Monis =

Iranian-Australian Sunni Muslim and terrorist

- Born: Mohammad-Hassan Manteghi Borujerdi; 19 May 1964; Borujerd, Iran
- Died: 16 December 2014 (aged 50); Sydney, New South Wales, Australia
- Cause of death: Ballistic trauma (shot by police)
- Known for: Responsible for the 2014 Sydney hostage crisis
- Criminal charges: Iran: Violent crime, fraud; wanted since 1996.; Australia: Postal harassment (convicted), sexual assaults, accessory to murder
- Spouse: Amirah Droudis

Man Haron Monis (Persian: هارون مونس; born Mohammed Hassan Manteghi Borujerdi; 19 May 1964 – 16 December 2014) was an Iranian-born refugee and Australian citizen who took hostages in a siege at the Lindt Chocolate Café at Martin Place, Sydney on 15 December 2014, lasting for 16 hours, until the early hours of the following morning. The siege resulted in the death of Monis and two hostages.

While Monis had a warrant out for his arrest in Iran, he sought political asylum in Australia in 1996, which was granted in 2001. Monis variously promoted himself as an Iranian intelligence official, a political activist, a spiritual healer and expert in black magic, an outlaw bikie and a Muslim cleric. He told a psychiatrist who diagnosed him with schizophrenia that he had to change his name for "security reasons," variously calling himself "Michael Hayson Mavros", "Sheikh Haron", and "Ayatollah Mohammed Manteghi Boroujerdi".

Monis ran a "spiritual healing" business, telling some women that they needed to submit to sexual molestation to receive treatment. In 2014, Monis was charged with being an accessory to the murder of his ex-wife, as well as over 40 counts of sexual assault. At the time of his death, he had recently converted from Shia Islam to Sunni Islam, and attended Islamist rallies promoting conspiracy theories about Australian security agencies. While on bail, and facing a likely lengthy imprisonment, he declared allegiance to the Islamic State of Iraq and the Levant.

== Life in Iran ==
Monis was born in Borujerd, Iran on 19 May 1964. He published a book of poetry, Inside and Out or Daroon va Boroon (Persian: درون و برون), in 1996 in Iran. It did not sell well, which disappointed Monis. In the 1990s, Monis ran a company called Salehan-ë Amal (Persian: صالحان عمل), which he used to buy discounted tyres from the Iranian government and re-sell them on the black market. He also ran a charity scam to avoid paying tax.

In 2001, using the pseudonym Ayatollah Manteghi Boroujerdi, he claimed in an interview with ABC Radio National's The Religion Report that he had been involved with the Iranian ministry of intelligence and security, and that his criticism of the regime and secret information he possessed had resulted in his persecution as well as the detention of his wife and children. During an ABC Radio interview, he claimed that his family's detention was a result of views the Iranian government believed to be "dangerously liberal". David Ruteledge, the journalist who interviewed him, described this as "a little bit dramatic."

Australia granted his request for political asylum that year. He claimed that his request for asylum followed the detention of his wife and children by Iranian authorities after he espoused liberal views on Islam. According to London-based Persian TV channel Manoto 1, he had fled Iran after taking US$200,000 of his customers' money in his tourism agency. According to Iran's official news agency, he was under investigation by Interpol and Iranian police at the time he was granted asylum, and Australian police did not extradite him despite several requests. Some commentators have expressed concern regarding this immigration and citizenship process.

Esmaeil Ahmadi-Moghaddam, Iran's chief of police, told reporters that Monis had "a dark and long history of violent crime and fraud" in Iran and had run a travel agency in 1996, before fleeing to Malaysia and then Australia. "It lasted 4 years to collect evidence on Manteghi [Monis]'s identification documents and we reported this to the Australian police but since Australia has no extradition treaty with Iran, they didn't extradite him to Iran". He was protected from extradition by his refugee status.

Iran's official Islamic Republic News Agency states that he was "under prosecution by the Interpol" and Iran provided information to the Australian government about his criminal record, mental and spiritual status. Despite this, he was granted asylum in Australia. Iranian Foreign Ministry spokeswoman Marzieh Afkham publicly questioned the decisions made by the Australian government after several discussions in which Monis's criminal status in Iran was made "completely clear".

== Life in Australia ==
In 1996 Monis migrated to Australia as a refugee seeking political asylum. He used a one-month business visa to gain entry to the country. He applied for a protection visa when his business visa expired, and was granted a bridging visa while the protection visa application was assessed.

From 1997 to 2000, Monis held a security guard licence, which would have let him carry a pistol between March and June 1997.

In November 2000, he chained himself to a pole at Parliament House, Sydney, and went on a one-day hunger strike to draw attention to his cause.

He began to sexually assault women while passing himself off as a spiritual healer named 'Marcus' in the early 2000s.

On 16 September 2002, Monis changed his name to Michael Hayson Mavros. While he was known as Mavros, he seemed to be 'embracing a secular life'.

He gained Australian citizenship in 2004. On 21 September 2006, he changed his name to Man Haron Monis. Monis was investigated by the Australian Security Intelligence Organisation four times, and there were more than 40 calls to ASIO's National Security Hotline. The family of his partner called the National Security Hotline in 2010 and were advised Monis "wasn't a threat". Monis had been on the Australian Security Intelligence Organisation's watch-list in 2008 and 2009, but was dropped off the list for reasons that were not specified.

In 2009, in Granville, NSW, Monis gave a lecture calling for an Islamic society and taunting foreign governments saying, "your intelligence service is not working properly."

Monis lived in a flat with a housemate for six months in 1998. Monis said he was a senior member of the clergy in Iran, always locked his bedroom door, even when he went to the bathroom, and told his housemate not to bring friends over and not to answer the door if anyone knocked. Monis said that he was in "financial hardship" and borrowed $9,000, which were never repaid.

=== Spouses ===
In 2003, Monis dated Amanda Morsy for about six months, telling her he was Romanian, giving her gold necklaces and driving her to dates in a Mercedes, convertible Peugeot and a Jeep. Monis was unable to be contacted after 8 pm, claiming he was busy with his "spiritual consultation" business. Morsy described him as "secretive", "very reserved" and "formal" and wanting to "fit in". He broke the relationship off after her family expressed reservations about his personality.

In 2003, Monis married a woman who was a client of his "black magic" business. However, he always kept his blinds closed, and told people at a Sydney mosque that he had a wife in Iran.

In July 2011, Monis was charged at a St Mary's police station for intimidation of his ex-wife, following a confrontation in a McDonald's car park in Green Valley. His ex-wife claimed Monis had threatened to shoot her and told her that he held a gun licence.

In 2010, the family of his girlfriend, Amirah Droudis, reported Monis to the National Security Hotline because they found his behaviour strange. He was secretive with the family and always refused to have his photo taken even at Christmas. He gave them the appearance of having money and being "very generous" but vague about where he worked. They described him as "rarely forthcoming with any direct or detailed answers."

Social worker Sylvia Martin talked with Monis during a meeting with his former wife in 2012. She described Monis as prone to "grandiosity" and a "hero in his own story" describing him as "capable of narcissism and also capable of manipulation." His ex-wife said that Monis had "intimidated, duped and emotionally manipulated her" and that around 2007 he "became more strict" and told her to wear a veil, and restricted her from "singing and dancing" allegedly telling her "I'm doing it for Islam ... I want to be a martyr".

==== Accessory to murder charge ====
On 21 April 2013, Monis' ex-wife's body was found stabbed 17 times and alight in a Werrington apartment stairwell. Monis' girlfriend, Amirah Droudis, was formally charged with murder, and on 15 November 2013, Monis was charged by NSW Police with being an accessory before the fact and an accessory after the fact to the murder.

On 12 December 2013, Monis and Amirah appeared before Magistrate William Pierce at Penrith Local Court where they were granted bail. The magistrate said there were significant flaws in the Crown's case against the pair and that it was "a weak case". Prosecutor Brian Royce said Monis' claims that the Iranian Secret Police and the Australian Security Intelligence Organisation (ASIO) were trying to frame him for the murder were fanciful. Magistrate Pierce said all theories needed to be examined.

On 22 January 2014, Monis appeared at Parramatta Local Court and, after informing magistrate Joan Baptie that he was representing himself, began discussing documents that he claimed were held by ASIO. He also claimed that ASIO was "conspiring against him" as they wanted him jailed. Magistrate Baptie told Monis that she had no power to order the release of documents held by ASIO and "advised him to stop talking because he would harm his defence". Monis staged a protest outside the court, following the adjournment of the case, "wearing chains and holding a sign claiming he has been tortured in custody". He was quoted as saying: "This is not a criminal case. This is a political case."

=== Claims of membership of Iranian Intelligence ===
Monis told individuals in Australia, including his lawyers, that he had worked for the Iranian Ministry of Intelligence and Security and had knowledge about Iran's clandestine operations, and that it was for this reason he fled Iran. However, an Iranian embassy official stated Monis' claim to have worked in intelligence and security in Iran was a lie.

Monis said he was the secretary of the Iranian intelligence department. After 9/11, Monis called ASIO saying he knew Iran was responsible and asked for a financial reward for the information. He also asked ASIO to pay him to work as an informant.

=== Allegations of fabricated cleric status ===
Monis proclaimed himself to be a Shia cleric. In late 2007, Australian Federation of Islamic Councils head Ikebal Patel said no Islamic community leaders knew anything about Monis and believed he "could be a fake deliberately stirring up anti-Islamic sentiment".

On 28 January 2008, Australia's senior Shia leader and head of Supreme Islamic Shia Council of Australia, Kamal Mousselmani, told The Australian that Monis "was not a genuine Shia spiritual leader" and "there are no ayatollahs in Australia." He urged Federal government officials to investigate his identity. "From the way he writes his fatwas (or religious edicts), I don't think he is Shia Muslim", he added.

=== Psychiatric assessment ===
In 2010 Monis was involuntarily hospitalised at Canterbury Hospital after displaying bizarre and erratic behaviour in a parking lot in Ashfield. A psychiatrist who assessed Monis said she believed he had chronic schizophrenia and needed to be on anti-psychotic medication. Monis stated that he had been forced to close his spiritual business, was $20,000 in debt, and had to change his name for "security reasons."

Monis was treated by two different psychiatrists who didn't know about the other and he was giving them different information. He was described as "quite guarded and reluctant to disclose too much information" and refused to give his phone number and home address. He was concerned that "ASIO and police were following him... and that some people could read his mind," according to a psychologist who grew up in Iran, who diagnosed him with obsessive-compulsive disorder. He avoided buying medication for mental illness with his Medicare card to conceal his use of medication from authorities.

One solicitor said that Monis seemed paranoid and would often speak with his hand over his mouth because he thought people "watching him" might be able to lip read.

In an inquest held after Monis' death, Dr. Jonathan Phillips diagnosed him as showing mixed features of narcissistic and antisocial personality disorders.

=== Hate mail campaign ===
Monis, together with Amirah Droudis, undertook a campaign protesting against the presence of Australian troops in Afghanistan, by writing letters to the families of soldiers killed there, in which he called the soldiers murderers, and urged the soldiers' families to petition the government to remove its troops from Afghanistan. According to Justice Dyson Heydon of the High Court, the letters compared "the (deceased soldier) son to a pig and to a dirty animal. It calls the son's body 'contaminated'. It refers to it as 'the dirty body of a pig'. It describes Hitler as not inferior to the son in moral merit". Monis was arrested on charges of "using a postal or similar service to menace, harass or cause offence". Droudis received a 2-year good-behaviour bond for "assisting Monis in sending the letters". She appealed the sentence, but on 12 March 2015 Droudis dropped her appeal.

=== Court cases ===
On 10 November 2009, Monis appeared in court and claimed through his lawyers to be a peace activist. He later chained himself to the courthouse in protest over the charges. Monis was subsequently barred by the courts from expanding his protest to include letters to UK soldiers' families. In an inquest, lawyer Chris Murphy said that Monis claimed to be contacting families to recruit "people who had suffered loss in war" to join his cause. Murphy said "He didn't strike me as very intelligent." Monis chained himself to the courthouse against the directions of lawyers, and Murphy said "He was entirely self absorbed with his performance ... my recollection is he held a pen in the air and said 'this is my sword'." Lawyers described Monis as a "pest" and a "dickhead".

Manny Conditsis said that conversations with Monis were "draining and exhausting." Monis expressed conspiracy theories about ASIO, claiming that families of dead soldiers were not upset at his letters, but "ASIO was putting them up to it." He said "Monis was a very proud man," who cried "like a baby" in prison. Another lawyer said he always wanted to be "the centre of attention" in the media.

In December 2011, Monis appeared before the Court of Criminal Appeal in Sydney arguing that the charges against him were invalid because they infringed his implied constitutional freedom of political communication, but the three-judge panel unanimously dismissed his case.

Upon further appeal to the High Court of Australia, the six-judge panel split 3–3 over the issue. Although the High Court of Australia normally comprises seven judges, one seat was vacant and as yet unfilled at the time Monis's case appeared before the court. Failing to achieve a majority vote in Monis's favour, the lower court's unanimous decision was left to stand.

On 12 December 2014, Monis' appeal against his conviction for criminal use of the postal service resulted in a split decision of the High Court. The decision related to his protest against the presence of Australian troops in Afghanistan, which he expressed by sending letters to the families of soldiers killed there in which he called the soldiers murderers and urged the families to petition the government to remove its troops from Afghanistan. One of the letters compared a dead soldier to a pig and called his body "contaminated". He sent similar letters to the families of British soldiers and the mother of a government official killed by a bombing in Jakarta, Indonesia. Monis pleaded guilty and was sentenced to probation and 300 hours of community service and banned from using the Australian postal service. According to The Age, this conviction consumed him for several years, and the hostage incident followed three days after an unsuccessful attempt to have the conviction overturned. Monis had been granted conditional bail because the magistrate said "there were significant flaws in the Crown's case".

=== Rebels Motorcycle Club ===
Monis attempted to join the Rebels Motorcycle Club sometime in 2012 or 2013, and was photographed with a "1%" logo representing outlaw motorcycle clubs. Club members reportedly stated "no one really liked him" and described him as "strange and weird" and said "He would say he had a lot of money, but then he didn't have any." He was kicked out of the club and Rebels took his motorbike.

=== Sexual assault charges ===
Monis ran a "spiritual healing" business and promoted himself as a clairvoyant and an expert in "astrology, numerology, meditation and black magic" services. Monis used the business to make unwelcome sexual advances toward vulnerable women, telling them that they could only receive treatment if they undressed and allowed him to massage their breasts and genitals. He also threatened to put curses on his victims if they refused.

On 14 March 2014, Monis was arrested and charged with sexually assaulting a young woman who went to his consultancy in Wentworthville, New South Wales, for "spiritual healing", after seeing an advertisement in a local newspaper. Seven months later, on 13 October 2014, a further 40 charges were added, including 22 counts of aggravated sexual assault and 14 counts of aggravated indecent assault, allegedly committed against six more women who had visited his business.

=== Political activity ===
Monis promoted himself as a peace activist, and told his lawyers that his hate-mail campaign was to make families of dead soldiers support peace.

Commercial news media in Sydney often condemned Monis for making videos with his girlfriend narrating, expressing happiness about the Holocaust and 9/11 and attacking rape victims. Monis hated Channel Seven for their coverage of the Muhamed Haneef affair, and ran aggressive protests outside their studios. He once rushed at television hosts Melissa Doyle and David Koch in Martin Place yelling, "You are a killer and a terrorist." Monis would often put on clerical garb and chain himself to a post visible from the Channel Seven live studio, handing out pamphlets declaring there was a "War on Islam" - leading the network to move studios when broadcasting the Sunrise program. Following the Haneef affair, in which a doctor was accused of aiding terrorists, Monis handed out pamphlets against Sunrise alleging that they told "Muslim doctors" that "If you want to kill people, why not use the tools of your own trade like a plague or a disease or something?" Monis made complaints to Channel Seven and the Australian Communications and Media Authority, which were dismissed.

Kevin Rudd publicised his consideration of changes to citizenship laws during the prosecution of Monis's letters. Monis used social media to attack politicians including then Australian Prime Minister Tony Abbott and former Prime Minister Rudd. His criticisms of Abbott, from 2013, related to Australia's military presence in Afghanistan. On 5 December 2014, he referred to a statement made by Rudd on changing immigration laws after Monis had been charged with seven counts of harassment. Before it was taken down, on 15 December 2014, Monis's Facebook account had 14,000 "likes".

Monis featured a photograph of Osama bin Laden on his website in 2008.

It has been reported that Monis was radicalised by members of Hizb ut-Tahrir. In June 2014, Monis attended a presentation by Uthman Badar and Wassim Doureihi of Hizb ut-Tahrir which was held in response to an earlier Uthman Badar lecture titled 'Honour Killings are Morally Justified', which was cancelled.

Monis attended Hizb ut-Tahrir rallies and was described by Sydney Morning Herald journalist Anne Davies as "a little unstable. He also seemed a little creepy. Ominously, he also told me he did not think giving speeches would be enough."

==== Seeking contact with ISIS ====
In October 2014, Monis wrote a letter to George Brandis' office seeking advice on the legality of communicating with ISIS.

==== Conversion to Sunni Islam ====
Monis claimed to have converted from Shia Islam to Sunni Islam. An announcement on his now-suspended website, posted a week before the Sydney siege, stated: "I used to be a Rafidi, but not any more. Now I am a Muslim, Alhamdu Lillah." "Rafidi", which means "one who rejects" in Arabic, "is typically used by Sunnis to denigrate Shias as non-Muslim." Monis also used his website to pledge allegiance to Abu Bakr al-Baghdadi, leader of the Islamic State whose 'main enemies' are the Shi'a.

On the day prior to taking a group of people hostage, Monis posted to his website:

Islam is the religion of peace, that's why Muslims fight against the oppression and terrorism of USA and its allies including UK and Australia. If we stay silent towards the criminals we cannot have a peaceful society. The more you fight with crime, the more peaceful you are. Islam wants peace on the Earth, that's why Muslims want to stop terrorism of America and its allies. When you speak out against crime you have taken one step towards peace.

Australian Muslim commentators said that his conversion to Sunni Islam was less out of genuine religious conviction than designed to provide credibility in seeking an association with ISIL, as one "can't really claim to love IS when you're a Shiite and they're trying to exterminate you". He was a long-time self-proclaimed sheikh, albeit not recognised as such in the Islamic community. He was marginalised by Australian Muslim religious authorities and mosques for his extremist views and problematic personal and criminal history. It appears he came to espouse an extreme Islamist ideology on his own, and police and intelligence agencies have not identified any connections between Monis and international terrorist organisations.

== The Lindt Cafe siege ==
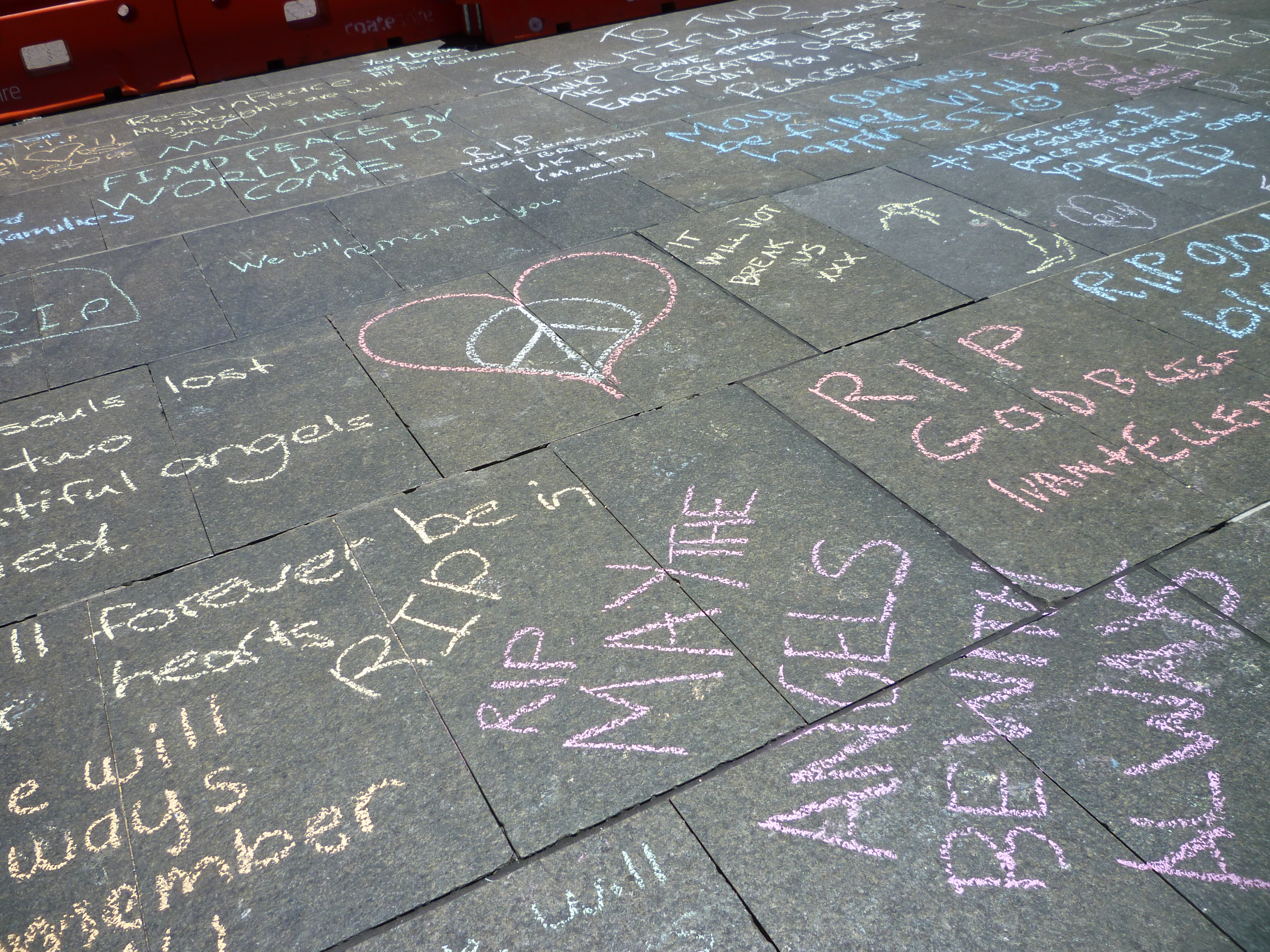
Messages chalked on Martin Place after the event

On the morning of 15 December 2014, Monis took hostage employees and customers at the Lindt chocolate café in Martin Place, Sydney, across from a Seven Network television studio. Hostages were made to hold up a Black Standard with the shahādah (Islamic statement of faith) written in white Arabic text.

Neighbouring buildings, including government offices and financial institutions, and Martin Place railway station, were evacuated and locked down. Some hostages managed to escape. The event lasted over 16 hours when hostages made a run for the exit with Monis firing, missing all hostages. Monis then took Tori Johnston (the cafe manager) at gunpoint forcing him to kneel before firing a fatal shot into Johnston's head. Police tactical officers then decided to storm the café resulting in a shootout between Monis and police in the early hours of the following morning and Monis was confirmed by police to have died in the ensuing confrontation. Two of the hostages died, several others were wounded, and a police officer suffered minor injuries.

In a website posting prior to the hostage incident, Monis denied all the charges against him, calling them politically motivated, accusing the Iranian Ministry of Intelligence and Australia's ASIO of framing him.

No one claimed Monis's body when it was released by the NSW Coroner, and he was subsequently buried in an undisclosed NSW location at state expense.

In 2016, Monis was listed under mentally disturbed individuals who have launched recent violent attacks justified with Islamist ideas or slogans. Other examples include the perpetrator of the 2016 Munich knife attack and Michael Zehaf-Bibeau, the perpetrator of the 2014 shootings at Parliament Hill, Ottawa. According to psychologists and psychiatrists who study radicalisation, jihad propaganda and calls to kill the infidels can push mentally ill individuals to act, even in the absence of direct or personal contact with Islamists.

== Investigations ==
Prime Minister Tony Abbott was briefed by the Australian Federal Police on 16 December 2014 that Monis had a gun licence, but the AFP later confirmed that Monis "was not a registered firearms licence holder". A joint review has been announced by the federal and state governments, to be helmed by Michael Thawley from the Department of the Prime Minister and Cabinet and Blair Comley of the New South Wales Department of Premier and Cabinet. It will investigate the handling of the siege, and how Monis "slipped through state and federal security and legal nets". Although a call had been made to the national security hotline based on the contents of Monis' website, there were no threats of direct violence.

On 16 December 2014, officers from the New South Wales Police Force and the Australian Federal Police went to the Belmore home of Monis' partner Amirah Droudis, and removed property. Her bail was revoked after a hearing on 22 December. In November 2016 Droudis was found guilty, in a judge-only trial, of the murder of Monis' ex-wife.

On 29 January 2015, an inquest began into the deaths at the Lindt Cafe, presided over by the NSW State Coroner, Michael Barnes. Its aim is "to determine how the [three] deaths occurred, the factors that contributed to them and whether they could have been prevented". The joint State-Federal review was released on 22 February 2015.

== See also ==
- 2015 Parramatta shooting
- Crime in Australia
- Islam in Australia
- List of terrorist incidents in Australia
