= United Nations Special Envoy on Myanmar =

Representative of the UN Secretary-General

The Special Envoy of the Secretary-General on Myanmar is a Special Envoy of the Secretary-General of the United Nations created in 2018 to respond to the Rohingya genocide starting in August 2017 and its effects in Myanmar. According to the mandate established by the UN General Assembly in its resolution 72/248 in 2017, the Special Envoy "works in close partnership with all stakeholders including local communities and civil society, and regional partners, notably the Government of Bangladesh and the Association of Southeast Asian Nations (ASEAN), regional countries, and the broader membership of the United Nations."

Commenting on the nomination of the second Special Envoy in October 2021, a number of Myanmar political commentators said that the chances of this mission are very limited, independent of the current envoy. Rather, they cautioned that apart from the mission to positively influence the displacement and ongoing crimes against humanity affecting the Rohingya communities, the Special Envoy "must also continue with the task of trying to persuade the Myanmar junta leaders to engage in dialogue to settle the ongoing political and social turmoil caused by their February 1 coup".

== Christine Schraner Burgener ==
In her briefings for the UN Security Council between February 2019 and October 2021, Special Envoy Christine Schraner Burgener reported on her visits to the camps for Rohingya refugees in Bangladesh and Rakhine State of Myanmar as well as on her talks with the Myanmar government and former State Counsellor Aung San Suu Kyi. This included Schraner Burgener's general assessments of the political and human situation before and after the 2021 Myanmar coup d'état.

During Schraner Burgener's tenure, in December 2019 Aung San Suu Kyi appeared in the International Court of Justice at The Hague, where she defended the Burmese military, also called Tatmadaw, against allegations of genocide against the Rohingya. As she had never clearly acknowledged the persecution and killings perpetrated by the Myanmar military against the Rohingya people, Aung San Suu Kyi had increasingly received global criticism, including calls to revoke her Nobel Peace Prize.

Following the coup d'état in February 2021, Schraner Burgener became more critical of the Myanmar military in her statements: “For the last three years, I was guided by a strategy of quiet diplomacy,” Schraner Burgener said. "I tried to be balanced in my statements not only in the Security Council but also in the General Assembly. In my view, this was the right strategy, because my task was to bring the Burmese government closer to the U.N.” She also explained that the U.N. is unable to "openly promote the imposition of sanctions before the U.N. Security Council, [as] it is up to member states to make such decisions. China and Russia have made it clear they oppose sanctions". According to an article in Foreign Policy magazine, she then rather called for "a broad range of punitive measures against key sectors of Myanmar's economy controlled by the military." In this final year of her mandate, Schraner Burgener also spoke out against "the ongoing killings by security forces turning against their own citizens, including children, youth, and women" and warned "A bloodbath is imminent.”

In an article about Schraner Burgener's tenure, The Irrawaddy newspaper, published by Myanmar journalists in Thailand, deemed the aims of the UN Special Envoy using nonviolent and peaceful approaches of talks and phone calls "ineffective" and a "diplomatic graveyard" given the ruthless and oppressive history of the Myanmar military junta.

== Noeleen Heyzer ==
Since the 2021 coup d'état and subsequent protests, the second envoy Noeleen Heyzer made several statements about the county's possible future developments. Following an interview with Channel NewsAsia (CNA) on 31 January 2022, where she had mentioned a "power-sharing arrangement" between the State Administration Council (the military junta put in place by the Tatmadaw following the coup d'état) and the democratically elected government, she was heavily criticized by Myanmar civil society organizations.

In a statement issued to the media on 3 February, the Office of the Special Envoy of the Secretary-General on Myanmar said Heyzer's words were misinterpreted and she had "never proposed power sharing as an option and has consistently advocated for a Myanmar-led process that is reflective of the will and the needs of the people, as reflected in the 2020 elections."

On 5 May 2022, Heyzer participated in a virtual meeting with Union Minister for Humanitarian Affairs and Disaster Management of NUG Win Myat Aye and ministry staff involved in humanitarian activities. In so doing, she became the first international envoy to publicly engage with the National Unity Government (NUG). According to the Special Advisory Council for Myanmar (SAC-M) and the ASEAN Parliamentarians for Human Rights, Heyzer was then disinvited to the Consultative Meeting on ASEAN Humanitarian Assistance to Myanmar (6 May) after her attendance was blocked by the junta, represented by the SAC Minister for International Cooperation Ko Ko Hlaing.

As Special Envoy, Heyzer participated in a special session of the 19th Shangri-La Dialogue of the International Institute for Strategic Studies (IISS) entitled "Myanmar: Finding a Way Forward" alongside co-panelists Malaysian Minister of Foreign Affairs Saifuddin Abdullah, Thai Special Representative of the Minister of Foreign Affairs on Myanmar Pornpimol Kanchanalak, and Counselor of the United States Department of State Derek Chollet on 11 June 2022. In her address to the session, she spotlighted the "urgency for a coherent international response built on regional unity" and insisted that more needed to be done to support local networks and to build community-based resilience. Concluding her statement, Heyzer observed, "The people of Myanmar have changed, there is a new dynamic. The youth have created a solidarity that has been able to go beyond ethnicity and religion, and there is greater discussion on inclusiveness and the type of future they want."

Two days later, on 13 June 2022, Heyzer briefed the United Nations General Assembly via video conference on the status of Myanmar. In her dire assessment, she observed that "[t]he military's violence, including against peaceful protestors has only intensified since [the coup d'état began on] 1 February 2021" and the ensuing political crisis "has opened front lines that had long been at peace."

Regarding the next Myanmar general election, proposed by the military junta for 2023, Heyzer said, “As far as the people are concerned, unless an election is inclusive and there is no fear in the expression of their political will, there's not going to be the legitimacy that will allow the government to go back to civilian rule. In other words, it will be the trigger for further violence."

In August 2022, Heyzer was given permission to travel to Myanmar and held talks with military leader Min Aung Hlaing in the capital Naypyidaw. Following the meeting, Heyzer's office stated she had “directly urged” him “to impose a moratorium on all future executions”. According to a report in Al-Jazeera, "she called for an immediate end to the violence and the release of all political prisoners, including former Aung San Suu Kyi's adviser Sean Turnell, an Australian economist. Further, Heyzer had wanted to meet Aung San Suu Kyi, but was unable to do so. During her visit, she stated “The people of Myanmar have the right to democracy and self-determination free from fear and want, which will only be possible by the good will and efforts of all stakeholders in an inclusive process.”

== List of special envoys ==
- Christine Schraner Burgener (26 April 2018–October 2021)
- Noeleen Heyzer (25 October 2021–June 2023)
- Julie Bishop (5 April 2024–)

== UN Special Rapporteurs on human rights in Myanmar ==
From 2014 to 2020, South Korean human rights advocate Yanghee Lee served as special rapporteur of the UN on the situation of human rights in Myanmar. As early as March 2018, Lee declared at the UN Human Rights Council. “I am becoming more convinced that crimes committed … bear the hallmarks of genocide, and call in the strongest terms for accountability.”

In 2020, former member of the US Congress Thomas Andrews was appointed as United Nations Special Rapporteur on human rights in Myanmar by the United Nations Human Rights Council.

== Independent Investigative Mechanism for Myanmar ==
Following the persecutions and killings in Kachin, Rakhine and Shan states and the UN Independent International Fact-Finding Mission on Myanmar (FFM), the UN Human Rights Council established the Independent Investigative Mechanism for Myanmar (IIMM) in September 2018. Its mandate is "to collect, consolidate, preserve and analyse evidence of the most serious international crimes and violations of international law committed in Myanmar since 2011. It is further mandated to prepare files in order to facilitate and expedite fair and independent criminal proceedings, in national, regional or international courts or tribunals that have or may in the future have jurisdiction over these crimes." The task of the IIMM is "to collect information, documentation and evidence and to use those materials to prepare case files. These materials will then be shared with national, regional or international courts or tribunals to facilitate criminal proceedings."

== See also ==
- History of Myanmar after 2016
- Human rights in Myanmar
