= Hizb ut-Tahrir (Australia) =

Australian chapter of pan-Islamist organisation Hizb ut-Tahrir

Hizb ut-Tahrir (Australia) حزب التحرير
- Leader: Australian leader, Sheikh Ismail al-Wahwah; Global leader, Ata Abu Rashta
- Spokesperson: Wassim Doureihi
- Founder: Global founder, Taqiuddin al-Nabhani
- Founded: 1953; 73 years ago
- Banned: March 6 2026
- Headquarters: Sydney
- Membership: +300
- Ideology: Hizb ut-Tahrir internationally Pan-Islamism; Islamism; Muslim supremacism Caliphalism; Salafism; Jihadism; Anti-secularism; Anti-Western sentiment Anti-Hindu sentiment Anti-Christian sentiment Anti-nationalism; Antisemitism; Anti-Zionism; Anti-democracy; Anti-liberalism; Anti-capitalism (Note: The group oppose both communism and capitalism. From their constitution: "Article 128: The disposal of property is restricted by the permission of the Legislator, i.e., Allah, (swt) whether it is spending or investing of property. Squandering, extravagance and miserliness are forbidden. Also forbidden are the capitalist companies, co-operatives, all other illegal transactions, usury (riba), fraud, monopolies, gambling and the like".); Anti-communism; Anti-feminism "Hizb ut-Tahrir Constitution" (self‑declared)
- Political position: Far-right; Non-aligned; Theocratic
- Religion: Sunni Islam

Flag

Website
- www.hizb-australia.org

Hizb ut-Tahrir (Arabic: حزب التحرير Ḥizb at-Taḥrīr; Party of Liberation) is an international pan-Islamist and fundamentalist political organisation. The organisation is considered a "radical Islamic group" and has come under scrutiny from the Australian government.

They are commonly associated with the goal of all Muslim countries unifying as an Islamic state or caliphate ruled by Islamic law (sharia) and with a head of state (caliph) elected by Muslims.

Hizb ut-Tahrir (Australia) has prepared a structure, constitution and an anthem for its proposed Khilafah State. It has more than 300 members in Australia. The Hizb ut-Tahrir constitution contains contentious issues such as (Article 7c), "Those who are guilty of apostasy (murtadd) from Islam are to be executed". The proposed state would enforce Islamic Sharia law. According to Hizb ut-Tahrir (Australia), "Europe and the U.S are the enemy", Jews "are the most evil creatures", women should be segregated for "cultural reasons", and Muslim children should not be forced to sing the Australian national anthem. Following the 2025 Bondi Beach shooting, a ban on all far-right and Islamist extremist groups is being considered which Hizb ut-Tahrir is now outlawed on 5 March 2026.

== Background ==
The group do not believe in the legitimacy of any country.

== 1953–2005 ==
They are a messianic group that emerged in 1950s Palestine and Arabia but is currently strongest in Central Asia and possibly based in London or elsewhere in Europe.

== 2005–2009 ==
In Australia in 2005, the party survived a proposed ban after clearance from the Australian Security Intelligence Organisation.

The party planned its first Khilafah conference in Sydney for 27 January 2007. The planned conference led to allegations in newspaper reports that the party was linked to the July 2005 London bombings. Opposition politicians called on the local and federal governments not to grant visas to foreign speakers attending, and to re-consider proscribing Hizb ut-Tahrir. The demands for a ban were rejected by Attorney General Philip Ruddock, on the grounds there was insufficient evidence to warrant banning the group. Radical clerics from the group demanded the establishment of a Muslim superstate, and warned Muslims they must be prepared to kill anyone who threatened its existence.

Hizb ut-Tahrir members originally planned to hold the conference in the town hall of Bankstown, New South Wales, a suburb of Sydney with adjacent Lakemba as Australia's biggest Muslim electorate, but the Sydney council cancelled it. Hizb ut-Tahrir secured another location the next day on 28 January. According to the Herald Sun, he also stated, "if you people are united and a third person comes along and tries to incite disunity ... kill him..., Muslims are not unique in doing so, as most nations kill those charged with treason...."

Conference spokesman Wassim Doureihi said the work of Hizb ut-Tahrir was not to change the political landscape in Australia. He added, "It is because of Islam and my allegiance to Islam that I am responsible for ensuring to do what I can to protect the safety and security of all peoples in this country and beyond."

Morris Iemma, Premier of New South Wales and MP for Lakemba, which with adjacent Bankstown has Australia's largest Muslim community, stated around the time of the conference that Hizb ut-Tahrir "is an organisation that is basically saying that it desires to declare war on Australia, our values and our people." even though according to Sydney Morning Herald, the speakers at the Khilafah Conference "made it clear they did not see Australia as part of their fundamentalist society" Attorney General Philip Ruddock responded that the Iemma government should "stop playing politics and if it had any evidence helpful to the security agencies, it should give it to them."

One opponent of a ban on Hizb ut-Tahrir, Irfan Yusuf, writing in the on-line publication Crikey, stating in No need to be alarmed about Hizb ut-Tahrir that the opposition Australian Labor Party "clearly wants to look tougher than the government on national security. But it risks alienating much of its support base in some Muslim circles by picking on a group many Muslims regard as harmless." Ban supporter Rebecca Weisser, however, alleged in The Australian that former members of Hizb ut-Tahrir include Abu Musab al-Zarqawi, Khalid Sheikh Mohammed Omar Bakri Mohammed "four of the seven suspects in the failed terror attacks on London on June 29 and in Glasgow on July 1." In Australia, writer Thomas Lehmann criticized the party and its former media representative, Wassim Doureihi, because they "openly flout our hospitality and tolerance while advocating the replacement of our democratic system with theocratic fascism," and for refusing "to condemn the September 11, Bali or London terror attacks."

== 2010–2014 ==
On 15 September 2012, there were protests outside the American Embassy in Sydney urged on by the website of Hizb ut-Tahrir against non-Muslims. The visiting UK Spokesman for Hizb ut-Tahrir, Taji Mustafa, denied demanding protests and uprisings, although all links on his website leading to Facebook groups substantiate these denials as untrue. The protests preceded an organised gathering at Bankstown on 16 September. Although a video is blamed for the protests, Hizb ut-Tahrir's objectives, led by Taji Mustafa, tend to be for a Caliphate. Placards carried during the protest on 15 September called for beheading, with one such placard being carried by a young child. Taji Mustafa brought further denials that his website has hate speech. There are calls for Hizb ut-Tahrir to be banned in Australia and Taji Mustafa not to re-enter Australia.

At a Hizb ut-Tahrir conference held in Sydney in November 2013, speakers called on those present to resist any attempts to moderate Islam, with a Hizb ut-Tahrir spokesman condemned any, "watering down of Islam". The audience was told that a war on Islam is being waged in this country. Reporting on the conference, a commentator noted the paradox in which, "Hizb ut-Tahrir [has the] propensity for condemning the government, culture, values and democratic traditions of Australia, while its members seem happy to live here".

Organisers of a cultural event hosted at the Sydney Opera House, which was part of the Festival of Dangerous Ideas, cancelled a speech by Hizb ut-Tahrir spokesman Uthman Badar in June 2014 titled ‘Honour Killings are Morally Justified’ after widespread outrage.

At a demonstration in Sydney held on 25 July 2014, Ismail Al-Wahwah, who is the group's leader in Australia, stated (as translated by MEMRI):

..It is a delusion to think that Palestine can contain the Jews as well as its people. Palestine cannot contain the Muslims and the Jews. It belongs to the local people. The Jews should not be in Palestine, and they will not remain there. Any Jew living in Palestine is an illegitimate occupier. He is a target of Jihad, and will end up in the garbage bin of history. This holds true for all the Jews in Palestine. It makes no difference whether a Jew is pro-peace or pro-war. Whether right-wing or left-wing, any Israeli living in Palestine is an occupier, and serves as a target for the Jihad of the Islamic nation. If you don't like it, take your passport and go back to where you came from...There is no place for you in Palestine. The Jews will not thrive and will not live in safety, because they are the slayers of the prophets...Wherever the Jews thrive, corruption abounds.

At the same rally, Wassim Doureihi described the conflict against Israel as "a civilizational struggle between Islam and between kufir," further stating that "This is an Islamic struggle to liberate Islamic lands, to re-institute Islamic rule over what is, and will always be, Islamic land." Regarding Jews who currently live in Israel, Doureihi offered the following advice: "our advice, very clearly, is to return to the lands from which you immigrated, to do so peacefully before you will do so forcefully."

In an audio clip of a speech on Voice of Islam Radio (Australia), which was later posted online 16 October 2014, Ismail Al-Wahwah stated (as translated by MEMRI) that "Our true conflict is with Europe and the U.S. They are the enemy. They are the ones that perpetrated crimes against the Islamic nation and its history." He further stated that "The Western standard of living is high because they stole our oil and resources, and prevented us from engaging in agriculture, industry, and trade. The famine in our country stems from Western policies."

Sheikh Ismail al-Wahwah (aka Abu Anas) is the spiritual leader of Hizb ut-Tahrir Australia. Wassim Doureihi is the spokesman for the organisation. Doureihi has been criticised for failing to denounce the Islamic State of Iraq and the Levant. Australian Prime Minister Tony Abbott said, "Hizb ut-Tahrir is an organisation with an ideology which justifies terrorism, and that's why I say it's un-Australian, it's also un-Islamic."

It has been reported that Man Haron Monis the gunman who took hostages in a siege at the Lindt Chocolate Café in Sydney, was radicalised by members of Hizb ut-Tahrir. In June 2014 Monis attended a presentation by Hizb ut-Tahrir which was held in response to an earlier Hizb ut-Tahrir lecture titled 'Honour Killings are Morally Justified', which was cancelled.

== 2015 ==
Hizb ut-Tahrir Australia refused to condemn the killing of Charlie Hebdo staff by Islamist militants and organised a Sydney rally, anticipating 10,000 would attend. On the night, some of the 800 attendees carried signs reading, "Je suis Muslims". Hizb ut-Tahrir speakers denounced freedom of speech and urged supporters not to turn the other cheek if Muhammad is insulted. Australian Prime Minister Tony Abbott said Hizb ut-Tahrir are a "bit thin-skinned about free speech" and need to, "lighten up"; a Hizb ut-Tahrir spokesman subsequently described Abbott's comments as provocative and derogatory.

A 2015 article on The Conversation website stated that Hizb ut-Tahrir is not registered as a political party in Australia, and is not active in any mosques or schools. The article said that the organisation "does not have any real influence on Australia’s Islamic community". Columnist Janet Albrechtsen says, "When Hizb ut-Tahrir exploits our liberties to espouse its freedom-loathing notions . . [we should confront and critique them] . . by exposing their agenda as medieval and immoral".

In February 2015 the Grand Mufti said the Australian Government should not ban Hizb ut-Tahrir, saying the group is "actually pro-freedom of speech". The Prime Minister responded by saying the comments were "unhelpful".

In a sermon that was posted on the Internet on 3 March 2015, Australian Hizb ut-Tahrir spokesperson Ismail Al-Wahwah stated (as translated by MEMRI) that "Refraining from fighting and from waging Jihad against the Jews constitutes fitna ['strife']. This fitna is worse than killing, because it means that the Israelites will rule the Muslims until Judgment Day" while adding that "Recognizing the Jews and giving them even a single inch of Palestine constitutes the epitome of evil, because this will strengthen that cancerous entity. They are the most evil creatures of Allah: "You shall find the strongest people in enmity towards the believers to the Jews and the polytheists." Later in his sermon, Al-Wahwah stated:

...Since their inception, the Israelites have gone hand in hand with evil and disobedience...The Jews are the most evil creatures of Allah. Moral corruption is linked to the Jews. Prostitution in the world began with the Israelites. Usury and gambling began with the Israelites. Killing who began with the Israelites. They slayed the prophets without just cause...They have corrupted the world with their corrupt media. The Israelites have corrupted the world with so-called art, cinema, and corrupt films, and with sex trade, drug trade, and moral depravity. They have corrupted the world in every respect. These are the Israelites.

Following the sermon the police said, "it is not possible to identify who uploaded the footage in question or charge him or her for uploading the offensive material." No charges were laid.

During a Hizb ut-Tahrir meeting in Sydney, in May 2015, women were segregated to the rear of the auditorium for "cultural reasons".

In November 2015, at a conference attended by more than 500 people, Hizb ut-Tahrir spokesman Uthman Badar said Muslim children should not be forced to sing the Australian national anthem as the, "anthem reflects a particular disputed view of history and celebrates particular ideological values. Why should they be forced to sing it?" Attorney-General George Brandis said Australians should be "appalled at its lack of respect for the nation’s cultural identity". Australia's Race Discrimination Commissioner, Tim Soutphommasane said Hizb ut-Tahrir's views are, "absurd."

== 2016 ==
In March 2016 the New South Wales Civil and Administrative Tribunal determined that separate male and female seating arrangements at public events hosted by Hizb ut-Tahrir contravened section 33 of the NSW Anti-Discrimination Act. The Tribunal ordered that all future publicity materials for public events hosted by Hizb ut-Tahrir must clearly inform attendees that segregated seating arrangements are not compulsory.

== 2017 ==
Following the participation of Yassmin Abdel-Magied as a panellist on ABC Q&A on 13 February 2017 where she started to explain part of her interpretation of Sharia law, Wassim Doureihi commented on his Facebook page about the episode. He said "The sister's arguments were indeed problematic, but the bigger problem was to accept to speak within such narrow confines in the first place. Was always set up for failure." A FB profile Yassmina be Chillin (authenticity unverified - not her official FB profile name) responded, saying she was willing to hear feedback and take advice. Doureihi responded that she, "ended up framing Islam through a secular lens, aimed at a secular people and conscious of the presence of a secular government".

In March 2017, at a public forum in Bankstown, Uthman Badar when asked about Article 7c of the Hizb ut-Tahrir constitution, said, "Islam is clear that apostates do attract capital punishment, we don't shy away from that."

In April 2017 Hizb ut-Tahrir produced a video in which two women discussed how to resolve marital conflicts. One of the women said, "a man is permitted to hit a woman as an act of discipline" and described the permissive text as "beautiful" and "a blessing". There was a strong rejection of the instructions contained in the video, with the Minister for Women Michaelia Cash saying, "these attitudes have no place in modern Australia". Hizb ut-Tahrir said in response to the criticism, "We firmly believe that we, as a community, must not shy away from the clarification of Islamic injunctions". Muslim community leaders have rejected the advice in the video saying, "Muslim men are required to take the Prophet as their role model and should therefore be active in campaigns and programs to prevent men's violence against women".

In August 2017 the group's leader Ismail al-Wahwah was banned from entering the kingdom of Denmark and classified as a hate preacher.

== 2025-2026 ==
=== After the 2025 Bondi Beach shooting ===
Following the 2025 Bondi Beach shooting, a ban on all far-right and Islamist extremist groups is being considered. As of 21st January 2026, online access to the Hizb ut-Tahrir website is no longer available.

On 5 March 2026, Australia proscribed Hizb ut-Tahrir under the new hate laws, with penalty for up to 15 years in prison.

== See also ==
- Antisemitism in Australia
- Far-right terrorism in Australia
- Islam in Australia
- Islamic organisations in Australia
- Islamic schools and branches
- Timeline of the Islamic State and Australia
- Wassim Doureihi
