= Christine Schraner Burgener =

Swiss diplomat

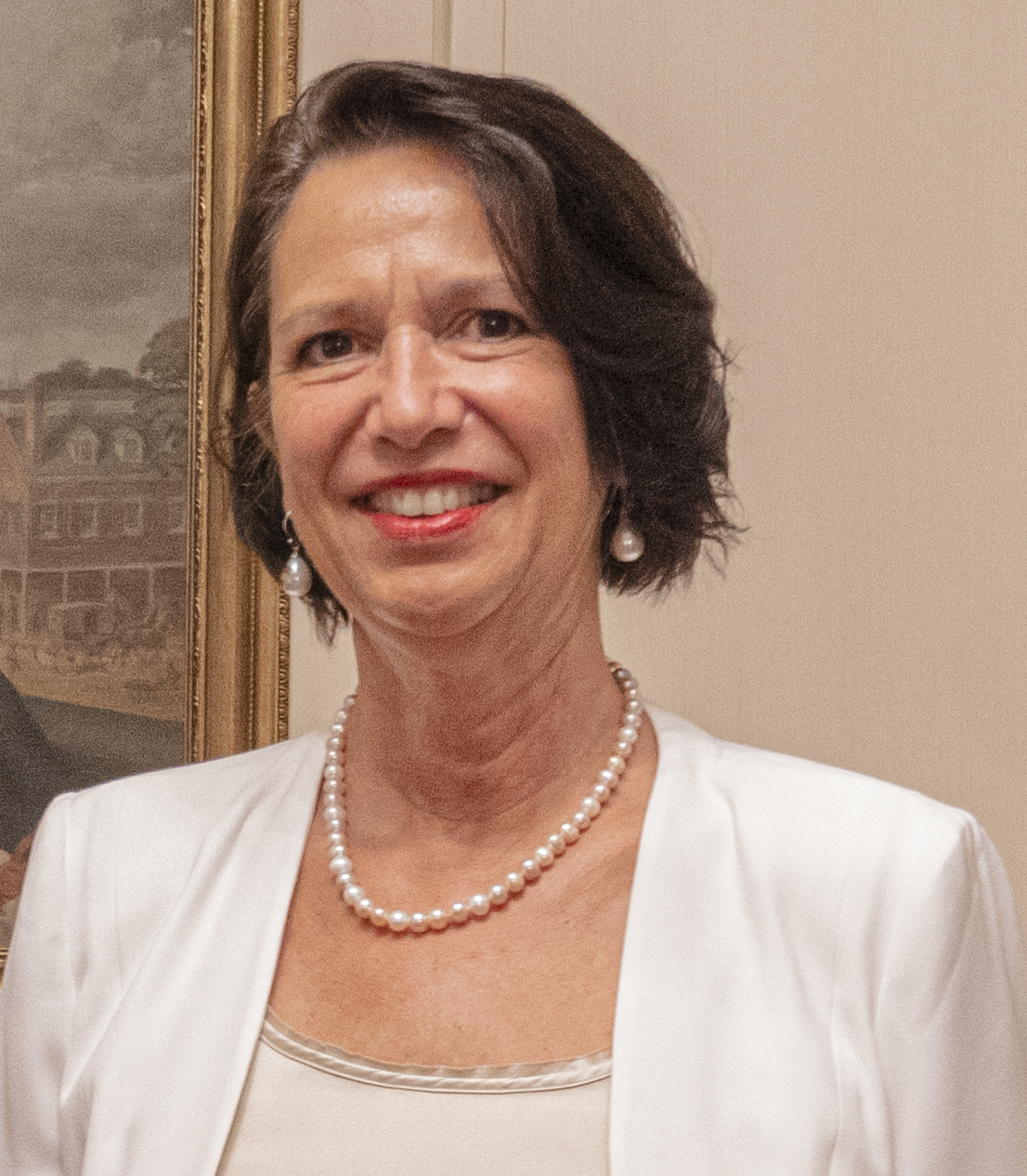
- Burgener in 2021

United Nations Special Envoy on Myanmar
- In office 26 April 2018 – October 2021
- Preceded by: Position established
- Succeeded by: Noeleen Heyzer

Swiss Ambassador to Germany
- In office 27 August 2015 – 14 May 2018
- Preceded by: Tim Guldimann
- Succeeded by: Paul Seger

Swiss Ambassador to Thailand
- In office August 2009 – July 2015
- Preceded by: Rodolphe Imhoof
- Succeeded by: Ivo Sieber

Personal details
- Born: Christine Schraner; September 25, 1963 (age 62) Meiringen, Bern, Switzerland
- Party: Social Democratic Party of Switzerland
- Spouse: Christoph Burgener

Christine Schraner Burgener (née Schraner; 25 September 1963) is a Swiss diplomat who most recently served as the United Nations Special Envoy on Myanmar during 28 April 2018 to October 2021. She previously served as an ambassador to Germany and Thailand.

== Personal life and education ==
Burgener was born in 1963 at Meiringen, Switzerland. She grew up in Tokyo, Japan with her father, a Swissair technician. She graduated from the University of Zurich with a degree in law.

Schraner Burgener is married to the diplomat Christoph Burgener (born 1962), the former Swiss ambassador to Myanmar. The couple has a daughter and a son. Schraner Burgener is a member of the Social Democratic Party of Switzerland.

== Career ==
She joined the diplomatic service in the Federal Department of Foreign Affairs in 1991, first as a stage in the International Law Section, then in 1992 as an attaché at the Swiss Embassy in Rabat, Morocco.

Back in Switzerland, she was deputy head of the human rights section from 1993 to 1997. During this time, she dealt with the establishment of the human rights dialogue with the People's Republic of China, lectured and published on the UN Convention on the Elimination of All Forms of Discrimination Against Women (CEDAW) and attended the 1995 World Conference on Women in Beijing as a member of the Swiss delegation. Afterwards, she was embassy counselor at the embassy in Dublin, sharing employment with her husband. From 2001 to 2003, she was also in employment with her husband, in the DFA head of the section on human rights policy, then employee of the department head Human Security.

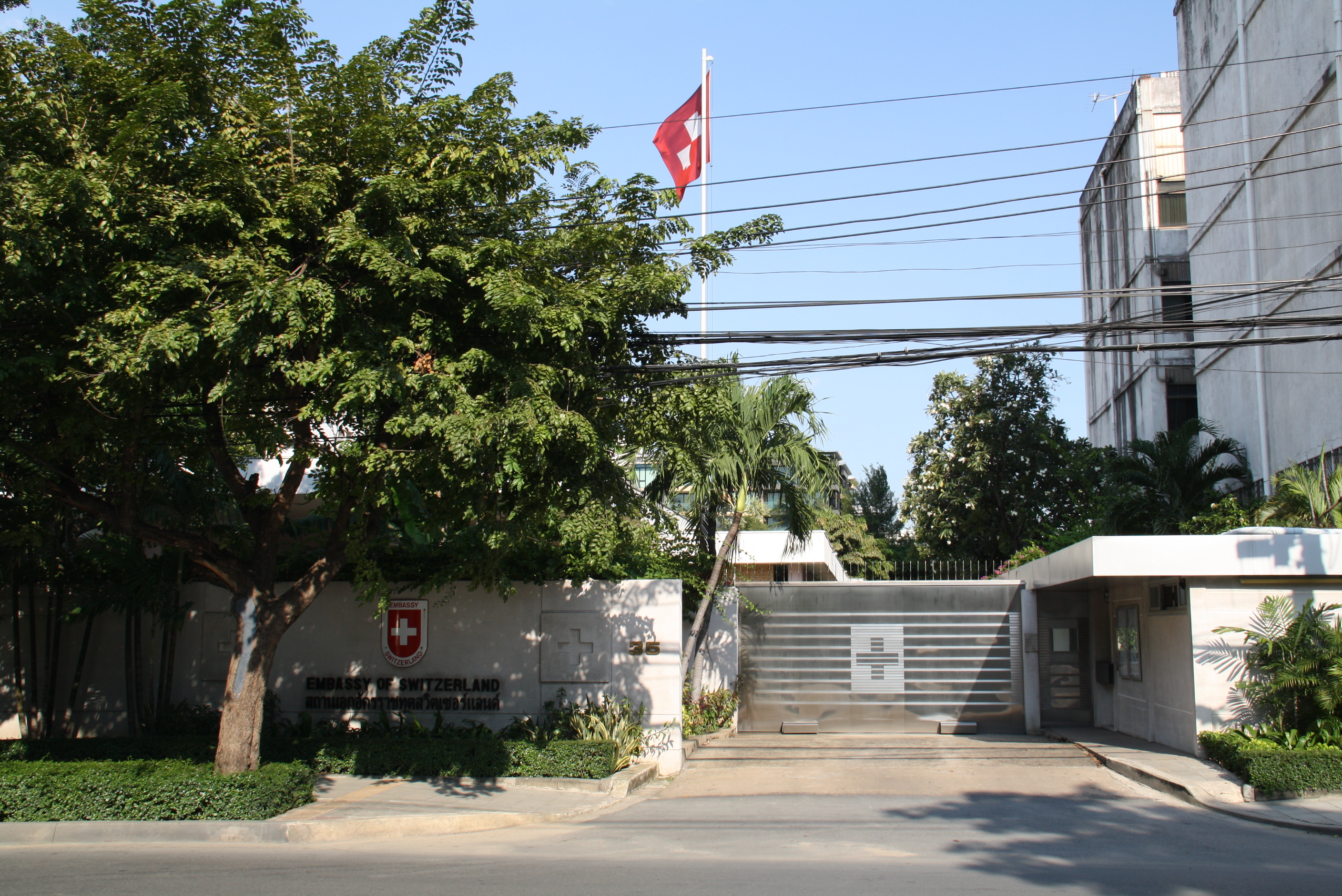
Swiss Embassy in Bangkok, 2009

From 2004 to 2009 she was deputy director of the International Law Directorate and Head of the Human Rights and International Humanitarian Law Department. As of 2007, she had the rank of ambassador there. She was Secretary-General of the International Humanitarian Investigation Commission (IHEK), coordinator of the Counter-Terrorism Working Group in the FDFA, member of the Anti-Trafficking Coordination Unit (KSMM) of the Federal Department of Justice and Police (FDJP), co-chair of the Cluster on Clustering Convention 2008 in Dublin and President of the FDFA section of the Union of the Federal Association of Employees (PVB).

Schraner Burgener had her first ambassadorship from 2009 to 2015 as the Swiss ambassador to Thailand, succeeding Rodolphe Imhoof. She was responsible for Thailand from 2009 to 2012 in the area of employment with her husband, and opened a Swiss embassy in Myanmar for Cambodia, Laos and Myanmar until 2012, when her husband was an ambassador. The principle of division of labor was supported by the then Swiss Federal Councilor Micheline Calmy-Rey. According to statements of the then German ambassador to Thailand Rolf Peter Gottfried Schulze, she is the only diplomat to have maintained contact with both camps during the 2013–2014 Thai political crisis.

The Swiss Federal Council elected her State Secretary for Migration in February 2021. She will take up the position in 2022 instead of 2021 due to the 2021 Myanmar coup d'état.
