= National Security Hotline (Australia) =

The Australian National Security Hotline was established on 27 December 2002 to receive information from the public about threats to national security and to refer them to policing and intelligence agencies. The hotline was established following the 2002 Bali bombings, in which 202 people were killed, including 88 Australians.

The Hotline was launched with a public information campaign that provided information about the heightened security environment. The campaign began with television advertising asking Australians to look out for a booklet that would be posted to every Australian home—‘let’s look out for Australia’.

The National Security Hotline can be contacted on 1800 1234 00 and is available 24 hours a day, 7 days a week.

== See also ==
- Australian Security Intelligence Organisation
