= Wassim Doureihi =

Australian Islamic activist

Wassim Doureihi (Arabic: وسيم دوريهي; born in Sydney, Australia) is a prominent member of Hizb ut-Tahrir in Australia, a global Islamic political party that advocates the re-establishment of the Caliphate. He is a spokesman for the organisation.

At a July 2014 demonstration in Sydney, Doureihi described the conflict against Israel as, "a civilizational struggle between Islam and between kufir," further saying that, "this is an Islamic struggle to liberate Islamic lands, to re-institute Islamic rule over what is, and will always be, Islamic land." Regarding Jews who currently live in Israel, Doureihi said, "our advice, very clearly, is to return to the lands from which you immigrated, to do so peacefully before you will do so forcefully."

In September 2014, in a speech to supporters at Lakemba, he said, "Let me say clearly, even if a single bomb went off, even if a thousand bombs went off in this country, all it will prove is that Muslims are angry".

In an October 2014 interview with ABC's Emma Alberici, Doureihi was asked his opinion on tactics employed by ISIS but instead he repeatedly diverted the topic in question to discuss Hizb ut-Tahrir's view about the origins of the crisis in Iraq and Syria and to express his condemnation of the role of Western nations in the Muslim world. Following the interview, Australian Prime Minister Tony Abbott said, "Hizb ut-Tahrir is an organisation with an ideology which justifies terrorism, and that's why I say it's un-Australian, it's also un-Islamic."

== See also ==
- Criticism of Islam
- Hizb ut-Tahrir
- Islam in Australia
- Islam by country
- Islamic organisations in Australia
