= List of 21st-century religious leaders =

This is a list of the top-level leaders for religious groups with at least 50,000 adherents, and that led anytime since January 1, 2001. It should likewise only name leaders listed on other articles and lists.

== Buddhism ==
- Cambodian buddhism —
  - Tep Vong, Great Supreme Patriarch of Cambodia (2006–2024)
- Engaged Buddhism —
  - Thích Nhất Hạnh, (1926–2022)
- Jodo Shinshu (complete list) –
  - Hongwanji-ha
    - Sokunyo, Monshu (1977–2014)
    - Sennyo, Monshu (2014–present)
  - Ōtani-ha
    - Chōken Ōtani, Abbot (1996–2020)
    - Chōyū Ōtani, Abbot (2020–present)
- Sōka Gakkai —
  - Einosuke Akiya, President (1981–2006)
  - Minoru Harada, President (2006–present)
- Thai Buddhism —
  - Nyanasamvara Suvaddhana, 19th Somdet Phra and Supreme Patriarch (1989–2013)
  - Ariyavongsagatanana IX, 20th Somdet Phra and Supreme Patriarch (2017–present)

=== Tibetan Buddhism ===
- Dalai Lama of the Gelug (Yellow Hat school) —
  - Tenzin Gyatso, 14th Dalai Lama (1940–present)

Mongolia

- Jebtsundamba Khutuktu of the Gelug in Mongolia —
  - Jambalnamdolchoyjijantsan, 9th Jebtsundamba Khutughtu (1991–2012)
  - Altannaryn Aguidai (or) Achiltai, 10th Jebtsundamba Khutughtu (2023-present)

Russia

- Buddhist Traditional Sangha of Russia —
  - Damba Ayusheev, 24th Pandito Khambo Lama (1995–present)

== Christianity ==
=== Catholicism ===
- Roman Catholic Church, (complete list) –
  - John Paul II, Pope (1978–2005)
  - Benedict XVI, Pope (2005–2013)
  - Francis, Pope (2013–2025)
  - Leo XIV, Pope (2025-Present)
- Eastern Catholic Churches
  - Ukrainian Greek Catholic Church –
    - Lubomyr Husar, Major Archbishop (2001–2011)
    - Sviatoslav Shevchuk, Major Archbishop (2011–present)
  - Maronite Church –
    - Nasrallah Boutros Sfeir, Patriarch (1986–2011)
    - Bechara Boutros al-Rahi, Patriarch (2011–present)
  - Syro-Malabar Church –
    - Varkey Vithayathil, Major Archbishop (1999–2011)
    - George Alencherry, Major Archbishop (2011–2023)
    - Raphael Thattil, Major Archbishop (2024–present)
- Independent Catholic groups (Note: Such groups are not in communion with the Pope.)
  - Apostolic Catholic Church (Philippines) –
    - John Florentine Teruel, Patriarch (1995–2021)
    - Juan Almario Calampiano, Patriarch (2021–present)
  - Philippine Independent Church –
    - Tomás Millamena, Supreme Bishop (1999–2005)
    - Godofredo J. David, Supreme Bishop (2005–2011)
    - Ephraim Fajutagana, Supreme Bishop (2011–2017)
    - Rhee Timbang, Supreme Bishop (2017–2023)
    - Joel Porlares, Supreme Bishop (2023-present)

=== Eastern Orthodoxy ===
==== Full Communion ====
- Ecumenical Patriarchate of Constantinople (complete list), the first among equals in Eastern Orthodoxy –

- Bartholomew I, Ecumenical Patriarch of Constantinople (1991–present)

- Greek Orthodox Patriarchate of Alexandria (complete list) –

- Peter VII, Patriarch of Alexandria (1997–2004)
- Theodore II, Patriarch of Alexandria (2004–present)

- Greek Orthodox Patriarchate of Antioch (complete list) –

- Ignatius IV (Hazim), Patriarch of Antioch (1979–2012)
- John X (Yazigi), Patriarch of Antioch (2012–present)

- Greek Orthodox Patriarchate of Jerusalem –

- Irenaios I, Greek Orthodox Patriarch of Jerusalem (2001–2005)
- Theophilos III, Greek Orthodox Patriarch of Jerusalem (2005–present)

- Albanian Orthodox Church –

- Anastasios (Yannoulatos), Archbishop of Tirana, Durrës and All Albania (1992–2025)
- Archbishop John of Tirana, Archbishop of Tirana, Durrës and All Albania (2025-present)

- Bulgarian Orthodox Church (complete list) –

- Maxim, Patriarch of All Bulgaria and Metropolitan of Sofia (1971–2012)
- Neofit, Patriarch of All Bulgaria and Metropolitan of Sofia (2013–2024)
- Daniil, Patriarch of All Bulgaria and Metropolitan of Sofia (2024-present)

- Cypriot Orthodox Church (complete list) –

- Chrysostomos I, Archbishop of Nea Justiniana and All Cyprus (1977–2006)
- Chrysostomos II, Archbishop of Nea Justiniana and All Cyprus (2006–2022)
- George III, Archbishop of Nea Justiniana and All Cyprus (2022–present)

- Czech and Slovak Orthodox Church –

- Nicholas of Presov, Metropolitan of the Czech Lands and Slovakia (2000–2006)
- Christopher of Prague, Metropolitan of the Czech Lands and Slovakia (2006–2014)
- Rastilav of Presov, Metropolitan of the Czech Lands and Slovakia (2014–present)

- Georgian Orthodox Church –

- Ilia II, Catholicos-Patriarch of All Georgia (1977–2026)
- Shio III, Catholicos-Patriarch of all Georgia (2026-present)

- Church of Greece (complete list) –

- Christodoulos of Athens, Archbishop of Athens and All Greece (1998–2008)
- Ieronymos II, Archbishop of Athens and All Greece (2008–present)

- Moldovan Orthodox Church –
  - Vladimir, Metropolitan of Chișinău and all Moldova (1992–present)
- Polish Orthodox Church –

- Sawa (Hrycuniak) of Poland, Metropolitan of Warsaw and All Poland (1998–present)

- Romanian Orthodox Church –

- Teoctist I, Patriarch of All Romania (1986–2007)
- Daniel Ciobotea, Patriarch of All Romania (2007–present)

- Russian Orthodox Church (complete list) –

- Alexy II of Russia, Patriarch of Moscow and All Russia (1990–2008)
- Kirill I, acting (2008–2009), Patriarch of Moscow and All Russia (2009–present)

- Serbian Orthodox Church (complete list) –

- Pavle, Archbishop of Peć, Metropolitan of Belgrade and Karlovci, and Serbian Patriarch (1990–2009)
- Irinej, Archbishop of Peć, Metropolitan of Belgrade and Karlovci, and Serbian Patriarch (2010–2020)
- Porfirije, Archbishop of Peć, Metropolitan of Belgrade and Karlovci, and Serbian Patriarch (2021–present)

- Orthodox Church of Finland – (complete list)

- John Rinne, Archbishop of Karelia and All Finland (1987–2001)
- Leo Makkonen, Archbishop of Karelia and All Finland (2001–2024)
- Elia Wallgrén, Archbishop of Helsinki and All Finland (2024–present)

==== Partial Communion ====
- Orthodox Church in America, North America (complete list) –

- Theodosius (Lazor), Archbishop of New York, Metropolitan of All America and Canada (1977–1980); Archbishop of Washington, Metropolitan of All America and Canada (1981–2002)
- Herman (Swaiko), Archbishop of Washington, Metropolitan of All America and Canada (2002–2005); Archbishop of Washington and New York, Metropolitan of All America and Canada (2005–2008)
- Jonah (Paffhausen), Archbishop of Washington and New York, Metropolitan of All America and Canada (2008–2009); Archbishop of Washington, Metropolitan of All America and Canada (2009–2012)
- Tikhon, Metropolitan of All America and Canada (2012–present)

=== Oriental Orthodoxy ===
- Armenian Apostolic Church (complete list) –

- Karekin II, Catholicos of All Armenians (1999–present)

- Armenian Apostolic Church (complete list) –

- Aram I, Catholicos of Cilicia (1995–present)

- Coptic Orthodox Church of Alexandria (complete list) –

- Shenouda III of Alexandria, Pope and Patriarch (1971–2012)
- Theodoros II of Alexandria, Pope and Patriarch (Pope Tawadros II) (2012–present)

- Eritrean Orthodox Church –

- Abune Phillipos, Patriarch (1999–2001)
- Abune Yacob, Patriarch (2002–2003)
- Abune Antonios, Patriarch (2004–2007)
- Abune Dioskoros, Patriarch (2007–2015)
- Abune Qerlos, Patriarch (2021–2022)
- Abune Basilos, Patriarch (2024–present)

- Ethiopian Orthodox Church (complete list) –

- Abune Paulos, Abuna and Patriarch (1992–2012)
- Abune Mathias, Abuna and Patriarch (2013–present)

- Syriac Orthodox Church –

- Ignatius Zakka I Iwas (1980–2014)
- Ignatius Aphrem II Karim (2014–present)

- Indian Orthodox Church (complete list) –

- Baselios Marthoma Mathews II, Catholicos of the East and Malankara Metropolitan (1991–2005)
- Baselios Mar Thoma Didymos I, Catholicos of the East and Malankara Metropolitan (2005–2010)
- Baselios Mar Thoma Paulose II, Catholicos of the East and Malankara Metropolitan (2010–2021)
- Baselios Marthoma Mathews III, Catholicos of the East and Malankara Metropolitan (2021–present)

=== Protestantism ===
- National Association of Evangelicals –

- Kevin Mannoia, President (1999–2001)
- Leith Anderson, President (2002–2003)
- Ted Haggard, President (2003–2006)
- Leith Anderson, President (2006–2019)
- Walter Kim, President (2020–present)

==== Baptist ====
- Baptist World Alliance —

- General Secretaries

- Denton Lotz (1988–2007)
- Neville Callam (2008–2026)

- Presidents

- Billy Kim (2000–2005)
- David Coffey (2005–2010)
- John Upton (2010–present)

Africa

- Baptist Convention of Angola –

- Mateus Chaves, President (c. 2010)
- Alexandre Melo Chilanda, General Secretary (c. 2010)

- Nigerian Baptist Convention –

- President

- Uche Enyioha, President (c. 2010)

- General Secretary and CEO

- S. T. Ola Akande, General Secretary
- S. Ola Fadeji, General Secretary
- Solomon Ademola Ishola, General Secretary (c. 2010)

Asia

- Paku Karen Baptist Association (Burma) –

- Letta, Executive Secretary
- Kooler, Executive Secretary
- Augustus Spurgeon, Executive Secretary
- Caleb Paw, Executive Secretary
- Paul Htoo, Executive Secretary (c. 2010)

- Association of Fundamental Baptist Churches in the Philippines –

- Arleen D. Fidel, Chairman (2004–present)

India

- Ao Baptist Arogo Mungdang –

- O. Alem, General Secretary (c. 2010)

- Convention of Baptist Churches of Northern Circars –

- T. Ch. Immanuel, President (2006–present)
- M. Ashok Kumar, Secretary (2006–present)

- Manipur Baptist Convention –

- Vumthang Sitlhou, General Secretary (c. 2010)

- Tripura Baptist Christian Union –

- Rajani Kaipeng, General Secretary (c. 2010)

Eurasia, regional

- Euro-Asian Federation of Evangelical Christians-Baptists Unions —

- Alexey Smirnov, President (2012–present)

- International Union of Churches of Evangelical Christians-Baptists —

- Gennadi Kryuchkov, Chairman (1962–2007)
- Nikolay Antonyuk, Chairman (2008–present)

Eurasia, national

- Evangelical Baptist Church of Georgia — Malkhaz Songulashvili, Bishop (present)
- Russian Union of Evangelical Christians-Baptists —

- Peter Konovalchuk, President (1994–2002)
- Yuri Sipko, President (2002–2010)
- Alexey Smirnov, President (2010–2018)
- Peter Mickiewicz, President (2018–present)

- Union of Evangelical Christian Baptists of Kazakhstan —

- Frans G. Tissen, President (present)

Europe, regional

- European Baptist Federation –

- Tony Peck, General Secretary (c. 2010)

- International Baptist Convention –

- Jimmy Martin, General Secretary (c. 2010)

Europe, national

- Baptist Union of Romania –

- Paul Negruţ, President (?–2007)
- Otniel Bunaciu, President (2007–present)

- Convention of the Hungarian Baptist Churches of Romania –

- Borzási István, President (c. 2010)

United Kingdom

- Baptist Union of Great Britain –

- Jonathan Edwards, General Secretary (c. 2010)

North America
Canada

- Baptist General Conference of Canada –

- Jamey McDonald, Executive Director (c. 2010)

- Canadian Baptist Ministries –

- Gary Vincent Nelson, General Secretary (c. 2010)

- Canadian Baptists of Western Canada –

- Jan Paasuke, President of the Board (c. 2010)

- Sovereign Grace Fellowship of Canada –

- Roger Fellows, General Coordinator (2001–NA)
- Mark Hudson, General Coordinator (c. 2010)

United States

- Alliance of Baptists –

- Brooks Wicker, President (c. 2010)

- American Baptist Churches USA –

- A. Roy Medley, General Secretary (c. 2010)

- Association of Reformed Baptist Churches of America –

- Gordon Taylor, Coordinator (2008–present)

- Baptist Bible Fellowship International –

- Linzy Slayden, President (c. 2010)

- Baptist General Conference –

- Jerry Sheveland, President (c. 2010)

- Baptist Joint Committee for Religious Liberty –

- J. Brent Walker – Executive Director (1999–2016)
- Amanda Tyler - Executive Director (2017–present)

- Baptist Missionary Association of America –

- John David Smith, Executive Director, (2010–present)

- Baptist Peace Fellowship of North America –

- Cheryl Dudley, President, (2008–2011)

- Conservative Baptist Association of America –

- Stephen LeBar, Executive Director (2004–2009)
- Stan Rieb, National Network Facilitator, (2009–present)

- Cooperative Baptist Fellowship –

- Daniel Vestal, Coordinator (1996–present)

- Enterprise Association of Regular Baptists –

- Eugene Dickerson, Moderator (c. 2010)
- Roger Ball, President (c. 2010)

- Full Gospel Baptist Church Fellowship –

- Paul S. Morton, International Presiding Bishop (1994–present)

- Fundamental Baptist Fellowship International –

- John Vaughn, President (c. 2010)

- General Association of General Baptists –

- James Murray, interim Executive Director (c. 2010)

- General Association of Regular Baptist Churches –

- John Greening, National Representative (c. 2010)

- National Baptist Convention of America, Inc. –

- Stephen J. Thurston, President (c. 2010)
- Samuel C. Tolbert, General Secretary (c. 2010)

- National Baptist Convention, USA, Inc. –

- William J. Shaw, President (1999–2009)
- Julius R. Scruggs, President (2009–2014)
- Jerry Young, President (2014–present)

- North American Baptist Conference –

- Rob McCleland, Executive Director (c. 2010)

- Ohio Valley Christian Baptist Church of God –

- Paul Hagen, General Superintendent (c. 2010)
- Delmar Rogers, General Secretary (c. 2010)

- Progressive National Baptist Convention –

- General Secretary

- Walter Parrish III, General Secretary (c. 2010)

- President

- T. DeWitt Smith, Jr., President (?–2010)
- Carroll A. Baltimore, President (2010–2014)
- James C. Perkins, President (2014–present)

- Southern Baptist Convention (complete list) –

- James Merritt, President (2000–2002)
- Jack Graham, President (2002–2004)
- Bobby Welch, President (2004–2006)
- Frank S. Page, President (2006–2008)
- Johnny M. Hunt, President (2008–2010)
- Bryant Wright, President (2010–2011)
- Fred Luter, President (2012–2014)
- Ronnie Floyd, President (2014–2016)
- Steve Gaines, President (2016–2018)
- J.D. Greear, President (2018–2021)
- Ed Litton, President (2021–2022)
- Bart Barber, President (2022–2024)
- Clint Pressley, President (2024–2026)
- Willy Rice, President (2026–present)

- United American Free Will Baptist Church –

- Henry J. Rodmon, General Bishop (c. 2010)

==== Holiness ====
- Christian and Missionary Alliance (U.S.) –

- David Rambo, President (c. 1987–2005)
- Gary Benedict, President (2005–2013)

- Church of the Nazarene –

- John A. Knight, General Superintendent (1985–2001)
- William J. Prince, General Superintendent (1989–2001)
- James Diehl, General Superintendent (1993–2009)
- Paul Cunningham, General Superintendent (1993–2009)
- Jerry D. Porter, General Superintendent (1997–2017)
- Jim Bond, General Superintendent (1997–2005)
- W. Talmadge Johnson, General Superintendent (2001–2005)
- Jesse Middendorf, General Superintendent (2001–2013)
- Nina Gunter, General Superintendent (2005–2009)
- J. K. Warrick, General Superintendent (2005–2017)
- Eugenio Duarte, General Superintendent (2009–present)
- David W. Graves, General Superintendent (2009–2023)
- Stan Toler, General Superintendent (2009–2017)
- David Busic, General Superintendent (2013–present)
- Carla Sunberg, General Superintendent (2017–present)

- Pillar of Fire International –

- Robert Barney Dallenbach, General Superintendent (2000–2008)
- Joseph Gross, General Superintendent (2008–present)

- Salvation Army –

- John Gowans, General (1999–2002)
- John Larsson, General (2002–2006)
- Shaw Clifton, General (2006–2011)
- Linda Bond, General (2011–2013)
- André Cox, General (2013–2018)
- Brian Peddle, General (2018–2023)
- Lyndon Buckingham, General (2023–present)

==== Lutheranism ====
International

- Confessional Evangelical Lutheran Conference –

- Steven P. Petersen, President (2008–2011)
- Daniel Koelpin, President (2011–present)

- International Lutheran Council –

- Chairman

- Ralph Mayan, Chairman (2005–2008)
- Gerald B. Kieschnick, Chairman (2009–2010)
- Hans-Jörg Voigt, Chairman (2010–2012)

- Executive Secretary

- Samuel H. Nafzger, Executive Secretary (2001 or before –present)

- Lutheran World Federation –

- Christian Krause (Germany), President (1997–2003)
- Mark Hanson (US), President (2003–2010)
- Munib Younan (Palestine), President (2010–2017)
- Musa Filibus (Nigeria), President (2017–2023)
- Henrik Stubkjær (Palestine), President (2023–present)

Europe

- Evangelical Lutheran Church of Estonia –

- Jaan Kiivit, Jr, Archbishop (1994–2005)
- Andres Põder, Archbishop (2005–2014)
- Urmas Viilma, Archbishop (2015–present)

- Evangelical Lutheran Church of Estonia Church Abroad

- Udo Petersoo, Archbishop, (1990–2006)
- Andres Taul, Archbishop, (2007–2010)
- Thomas Vaga, Acting Bishop (2011–present)

- Evangelical Lutheran Church of Finland –

- Jukka Paarma, Archbishop of Turku (1998–2010)
- Kari Mäkinen, Archbishop of Turku (2010–2018)
- Tapio Luoma, Archbishop of Turku (2018–present)

- Church of Norway –

- Harald V of Norway, King of Norway (1991–2026)
- Haakon VIII of Norway, King of Norway (2026–present)

- Swedish Church –

- Karl Gustav Hammar, Lutheran Primate of Sweden (1997–2006)
- Anders Wejryd, Lutheran Primate of Sweden (2006–2014)
- Antje Jackelén, Lutheran Primate of Sweden (2014–2022)
- Martin Modéus, Lutheran Primate of Sweden (2022-present)

North America

- Lutheran Church–Missouri Synod –

- Alvin L. Barry, President (1992–2001)
- Robert T. Kuhn, President (2001)
- Gerald B. Kieschnick, President (2001–2010)
- Matthew C. Harrison, President (2010–present)

- Evangelical Lutheran Church in America –

- H. George Anderson, Presiding Bishop (1995–2001)
- Mark Hanson, Presiding Bishop (2001–2013)
- Elizabeth Eaton, Presiding Bishop (2013–present)

- Lutheran Congregations in Mission for Christ –

- William Sullivan, National Service Coordinator (2002–2010)
- Mark Vander Tuig, National Service Coordinator (2010–present)

- Wisconsin Evangelical Lutheran Synod –

- Karl R. Gurgel, President (1993–2007)
- Mark G. Schroeder, President (2007–present)

- Evangelical Lutheran Church in Canada –

- Telmor Sartison, National Bishop (1993–2001)
- Raymond Schultz, National Bishop (2001–2007)
- Susan Johnson, National Bishop (2007–present)

==== Methodism ====
- African Methodist Episcopal Church –

- Clement W. Fugh, General Secretary (2000–present)

- Chinese Methodist Church in Australia –

- Albert Chiew, Bishop (c. 2008–2010)
- James Kwang, Bishop (2010–present)

- Free Methodist Church in Canada –

- Keith A. Elford, Bishop (1997–2017)
- Cliff Fletcher, Bishop (2017–present)

- Iglesia Evangelica Metodista en las Islas Filipinas –

- Nathaniel P. Lazaro, General Superintendent (2000–present)

- Methodist Church Ghana –

- Samuel Asante Antwi, President and Presiding Bishop (1997–2003)
- Robert Aboagye-Mensah, Presiding Bishop (2003–2009)
- Emmanuel Asante, Presiding Bishop (2009–present)

- Methodist Church in Malaysia –

- Peter Chio, Bishop (?–2004)
- Hwa Yung, Bishop (2004–present)

- Methodist Church of Southern Africa –

- President

- H Mvume Dandala, President (1998–2003)
- Ivan M Abrahams, President (2003–present)

- General Secretary

- Vivian Harris, General Secretary (1988–2001)
- Ross A J Olivier, General Secretary (2001–2005)
- Vuyani G Nyobole, General Secretary (2005–present)

- United Methodist Church –

- Gregory V. Palmer, President of the Council of Bishops (2008–2010)
- Larry M. Goodpaster, President of the Council of Bishops (2010–2012)
- Rosemarie Wenner, President of the Council of Bishops (2012–2014)
- Warner Brown, President of the Council of Bishops (2014–present)

==== Pentecostalism ====
- World Assemblies of God Fellowship –

- Thomas E. Trask, Chairman (2000–2008)
- George O. Wood, Chairman (2008–2022)

- Assemblies of God, United States –

- Thomas E. Trask, General superintendent (1993–2007)
- George O. Wood, General superintendent (2007–2017)
- Doug E. Clay, General superintendent (2017–present)

- Grace Communion International (until 2009, called the Worldwide Church of God from 1968 to 2009) –

- Joseph Tkach, Jr., President and pastor general (1995–present)

- New Apostolic Church –

- Richard Fehr, Chief apostle (1988–2005)
- Wilhelm Leber, Chief apostle (2005–2013)
- Jean-Luc Schneider (2013–present)

==== Presbyterianism ====
- Church of Scotland (complete list) —

- John Miller, Moderator of the General Assembly (2001)
- Finlay Macdonald, Moderator of the General Assembly (2002)
- Iain Torrance, Moderator of the General Assembly (2003)
- Alison Elliot, Moderator of the General Assembly (2004)
- David Lacy, Moderator of the General Assembly (2005)
- Alan McDonald, Moderator of the General Assembly (2006)
- Sheilagh M. Kesting, Moderator of the General Assembly (2007)
- David W. Lunan, Moderator of the General Assembly (2008)
- William C. Hewitt, Moderator of the General Assembly (2009)
- John Christie, Moderator of the General Assembly (2010)
- A. David K. Arnott, Moderator of the General Assembly (2011)
- Albert O. Bogle, Moderator of the General Assembly (2012)
- Lorna Hood, Moderator of the General Assembly (2013)
- John Chalmers, Moderator of the General Assembly (2014)

- Presbyterian Church (U.S.A.) (complete list) —

- Syngman Rhee, Moderator of the General Assembly (2000–2001)
- Jack Rogers, Moderator of the General Assembly (2001–2002)
- Fahed Abu-Akel, Moderator of the General Assembly (2002–2003)
- Susan R. Andrews, Moderator of the General Assembly (2003–2004)
- Rick Ufford-Chase, Moderator of the General Assembly (2004–2006)
- Joan Gray, Moderator of the General Assembly (2006–2008)
- Bruce Reyes-Chow, Moderator of the General Assembly (2008–2010)
- Cynthia Bolbach, Moderator of the General Assembly (2010–2012)
- Neal Presa, Moderator of the General Assembly (2012–2014)

==== Other protestant ====
- Christian Church (Disciples of Christ)
  - General Minister and President
    - Richard L. Hamm (1993-2003)
    - William "Chris" Hobgood, interim (2003–2005)
    - Sharon E. Watkins (2005–2017)
    - Teresa Hord Owens (2017–Present)
  - Moderator of the General Assembly
    - Paul D. Rivera (1999–2001)
    - Alvin O. Jackson (2001–2003)
    - Charisse Gillett (2003–2005)
    - Bill Lee (2005–2007)
    - Newell Williams (2007–2009)
    - Larry Brown (2009–2011)
    - Regina Morton (2011–2013)
    - Glen Miles (2013–2015)
    - Tony Rodriguez (2015–2017)
    - Sue Morris (2017–2019)
    - Belva Brown Jordan (2019–2023)
- Seventh-day Adventists (complete list) –

- Jan Paulsen, General Conference President (1999–2010)
- Ted N. C. Wilson, General Conference President (2010–2025)
- Erton Köhler, General Conference President (2025-present)

- General Assembly of Unitarian and Free Christian Churches (UK)

Liz Slade, Chief Officer (2019–present)

- Uniting Church in Australia –

- President

- James Haire, President (2000–2003)
- Dean Drayton, President (2003–2006)
- Gregor Henderson, President (2006–2009)
- Alistair Macrae, President (2009–2012)
- Andrew Dutney, President (2012–2015)
- Stuart McMillan, President (2015–2018)
- Deidre Palmer, President (2018–2021)
- Sharon Hollis, President (2021–2024)
- Charissa Suli, President (2024–2027)

- General Secretary

- Gregor Henderson, General Secretary (1989–2001)
- Terence Corkin, General Secretary (2001–2015)
- Colleen Geyer, General Secretary (2016–present)

- United Church of Canada –

- Marion Pardy, Moderator (2000–2003)
- Peter Short, Moderator (2003–2006)
- David Giuliano, Moderator (2006–2009)
- Mardi Tindal, Moderator (2009–2012)
- Gary Paterson, Moderator (2012–2015)
- Jordan Cantwell, Moderator (2015–2018)
- Richard Bott, Moderator (2018–2022)
- Carmen Lansdowne, Moderator (2022–2025)
- Kimberly Heath, Moderator (2025-present)

=== Anglicanism ===
==== Provinces of the Anglican Communion ====
- Church of England –

- Formal leadership –

- Elizabeth II, Supreme Governor of the Church of England (1952–2022)
- Charles III, Supreme Governor of the Church of England (2022-present)

- Effective leadership, (complete list) –

- George Carey, Archbishop of Canterbury (1991–2002)
- Rowan Williams, Archbishop of Canterbury (2002–2012)
- Justin Welby, Archbishop of Canterbury (2013–2025)
- Sarah Mullally, Archbishop of Canterbury (2026-present)

- Anglican Church of Australia (complete list)–

- Peter Carnley, Primate (2000–2005)
- Phillip Aspinall, Primate (2005–2014)
- Philip Freier, Primate (2014–2020)
- Geoffrey Smith, Primate (2020–2025)
- Mark Short, Primate (2025-present)

- Anglican Church of Canada –

- Michael Peers, Primate (1986–2004)
- Fred Hiltz, Primate (2007–2019)
- Linda Nicholls, Primate (2019–2024)
- Shane Parker, Primate (2025-present)

- Episcopal Church in the United States of America –

- Frank Griswold, Presiding Bishop (1998–2006)
- Katharine Jefferts Schori, Presiding Bishop (2006–2016)
- Michael B. Curry, Presiding Bishop (2016–2024)
- Sean Rowe, Presiding Bishop (2024–present)

==== Continuing Anglicanism ====
- Anglican Catholic Church
  - John Charles Vockler, Metropolitan of the Original Province (2001-2005)
  - Mark Haverland, Metropolitan of the Original Province (2005-present)
- Anglican Orthodox Church – Jerry L. Ogles, Presiding Bishop (2003–present)
- Federation of Anglican Churches in the Americas

- Anglican Church in America –

- Louis Falk, Primate (1991–2005)
- Louis Falk, President of the House of Bishops (2005–2025)

- Anglican Province of America
  - Walter Grundorf, Presiding Bishop (early 1990s–2021)
  - Chandler Holder Jones, Presiding Bishop (2021-present)
- Diocese of the Holy Cross – Paul C. Hewett, Diocesan Bishop (2006–present)
- Episcopal Missionary Church –

- William Millsaps, Presiding Bishop (2000–2005)
- Council Nedd II, Presiding Bishop (2005–present)

- Reformed Episcopal Church –

- Leonard W. Riches, Presiding Bishop (1996–2014)
- Royal U. Grote Jr., Presiding Bishop (2014–2016)
- Ray Sutton, Presiding Bishop (2017–present)

- Fellowship of Confessing Anglicans – Eliud Wabukala, Chairman (2008–present)

- Anglican Church in North America –

- Robert Duncan, Primate (2009–2014)
- Foley Beach, Primate (2014–2024)
- Steve Wood, Primate (2024–present)

- Church of England in South Africa –

- Frank J. Retief, Presiding Bishop (2000–2010)
- Desmond Inglesby, Presiding Bishop (2010–present)

- North American Anglican Conference

- Anglican Episcopal Church –

- Reginald Hammond, Presiding Bishop (2000–2004)
- George Connor, Presiding Bishop (2006–present)

- Diocese of the Great Lakes –

- Julius A. Neeser, Bishop Ordinary (1998–2002)
- David T. Hustwick, Bishop Ordinary (2002–present)

- Orthodox Anglican Communion –

- Scott Earle McLaughlin, Metropolitan Archbishop (2000–2012)
- Creighton Jones, Metropolitan Archbishop (2012–2015)
- Thomas Gordon, Metropolitan Archbishop (2015–present)

- Orthodox Anglican Church –

- Scott Earle McLaughlin, Presiding Bishop (2000–2012)
- Creighton Jones, Presiding Bishop (2012–2015)
- Thomas Gordon, Presiding Bishop (2015–present)

- Traditional Anglican Communion –

- Louis Falk, Primate (1991–2002)
- John Hepworth, Primate (2002–2012)
- Samuel Prakash, Primate (2012–2017)
- Shane B. Jenzen, Primate (2017–present)

- Anglican Catholic Church in Australia –

- John Hepworth, Archbishop (1998–2012)
- Michael Pope, Archbishop (2013–present)

- Anglican Catholic Church of Canada –

- Robert Mercer, Bishop and Metropolitan (1988–2005)
- Peter Wilkinson, Bishop and Metropolitan (2005–present)

- Anglican Church of India – Stephen Vattappara, Metropolitan Bishop (1990–present)
- Anglican Church in America –

- Louis Falk, Primate (1991–2005)
- Louis Falk, President of the House of Bishops (2005–2025)

- United Episcopal Church of North America –

- Stephen C. Reber, Presiding Bishop (1996–2010)
- Peter D. Robinson, Presiding Bishop (2010–present)

=== Other Christian denominations ===
- Believers Eastern Church –

- Athanasius Yohan I, Metropolitan (1993–2024)
- Samuel Theophilus, Metropolitan (2024–present)

- Church of God Ministry of Jesus Christ International

- María Luisa Piraquive, World Leader (1996–present)

- Assyrian Church of the East –

- Mar Dinkha IV, Patriarch (1976–2015)
- Mar Gerwargis III, Patriarch (2015–2021)
- Mar Awa III, Patriarch (2021–present)

- Ancient Church of the East –

- Mar Addai II, Patriarch (1972–2022)
- Yacob III Daniel, Patriarch (2022-present)

- Malankara Marthoma Syrian Church –

- Philipose Mar Chrysostym Mar Thoma, Marthoma Metropolitan (1999–2007)
- Joseph Mar Thoma, Marthoma Metropolitan (2007–2020)
- Theodosius Mar Thoma, Marthoma Metropolitan (2020–present)

- Members Church of God International –

- Eliseo Soriano, Presiding Minister (1977–2021)
- Daniel Soriano Razon, Presiding Minister (2021-present)

- The Church of Jesus Christ of Latter-day Saints (complete list) –

- Gordon B. Hinckley, President (1995–2008)
- Thomas S. Monson, President (2008–2018)
- Russell M. Nelson, President (2018–2025)
- Dallin H. Oaks, President (2025–present)

- Iglesia ni Cristo –

- Eraño Manalo, Executive Minister (1963–2009)
- Eduardo V. Manalo, Executive Minister (2009–present)

- Jehovah's Witnesses, Governing Body
  - Lyman A. Swingle (1971-2001)
  - Milton G. Henschel (1971-2003)
  - Theodore Jaracz (1974-2010)
  - Karl F. Klein (1974-2001)
  - Albert D. Schroeder (1974-2006)
  - Daniel Sydlik (1974-2006)
  - Carey W. Barber (1977-2007)
  - John E. Barr (1977-2010)
  - Gerrit Lösch (1994–present)
  - Samuel F. Herd (1999–present)
  - M. Stephen Lett (1999–present)
  - Guy H. Pierce (1999-2014)
  - David H. Splane (1999–present)
  - Geoffrey W. Jackson (2005–present)
  - Anthony Morris III (2005-2023)
  - D. Mark Sanderson (2012–present)
  - Kenneth E. Cook Jr. (2018–present)
  - Gage Fleegle (2023–present)
  - Jeffrey Winder (2023–present)
  - Jody Jedele (2024-present)
  - Jacob Rumph (2024-present)
- National Council of the Churches of Christ in the USA –

- Robert W. Edgar, General Secretary (1999–2007)
- Michael Kinnamon, General Secretary (2007–2011)
- Peg Birk, General Secretary (2012–2013)
- Jim Winkler, General Secretary (2014–present)

- Unification Church –

- Sun Myung Moon, 'True Father' (1953–2012)
- Hak Ja Han, 'True Mother'/Acting Leader (2012–present)

- World Council of Churches –

- Konrad Raiser, General Secretary (1993–2003)
- Samuel Kobia, General Secretary (2004–2009)
- Olav Fykse Tveit, General Secretary (2010–2020)
- Ioan Sauca, Acting General Secretary (2020-2022)
- Jerry Pillay, General Secretary (2023-present)

== Hinduism ==
- Ramanandi Sampradaya —

- Rambhadracharya, Jagadguru Acharya (1988–present)

- Sanatan Dharma Maha Sabha —

- Krishna Maharaj (1986–2003)
- Uttam Maharaj (2005–2018)
- Rampersad Parasram, Dharmacharya (2019–present).

=== Gaudiya Vaishnavism ===
- Gaudiya Mission —

- Bhakti Suhrid Paribrajak, president-acharya (1993–2018)
- Bhakti Sundar Sanyasi Maharaj, president-acharya (2018–present)

- Gaudiya Vedanta Samiti —

- Bhakti Vedanta Budhayan Goswami, president-acharya (2020–present)

- International Society for Krishna Consciousness — the members of Governing Body Commission (Jayapataka Swami and others)
- Science of Identity Foundation — Siddhaswarupananda Paramahamsa (1977–present)
- Sri Caitanya Prema Samsthana — Shrivatsa Goswami, director (1972–present)
- Sri Chaitanya Saraswat Math —

- Bhakti Sundar Govinda Dev-Goswami, president-acharya (1988–2010)
- Bhakti Nirmal Acharya, president-acharya (2010–present)

- The Vaishnava Foundation — Kailasa Candra Dasa (1986–present)
- World Vaisnava Association —

- Srila Nayananandana Das babaji, President (1999–2002)
- Srila Bhakti B. Tirtha Maharaj, President (2002–present).

=== Smarta tradition ===
- Shankaracharyas —

- Swami Swaroopanand Saraswati, Shankaracharya of Jyotirmath, Badrinath and Dwarka Sharada Peetham, Dwarka (1982-2022)
- Swami Nischalanand Saraswati, Shankaracharya of Govardhan Math, Puri (1992-present)
- Swami Bharati Tirtha Mahasannidhanam, Shankaracharya of Sringeri Sharada Peetham, Sringeri (1974–present)

=== Swaminarayan Sampradaya ===
- Ahmedabad Nar Narayan Dev Gadi —

- Acharya Shree Tejendraprasadji Maharaj (1969–2004)
- Acharya Shree Koshalendraprasadji Maharaj (2004–present)

- Vadtal Laxmi Narayan Dev Gadi —

- Acharya Shree Ajendraprasadji Maharaj (1984–present)
- Swaminarayan Gurukul —

- Guruvarya Shri Devkrushnadasji Swami (1974–present)

- Acharya Shree Rakeshprasadji Maharaj (2003–present)

- BAPS —

- Pramukh Swami Maharaj, President (1971–2016)
- Mahant Swami Maharaj, President (2016–present)

- Swaminarayan Mandir Vasna Sanstha —

- Gurudev Bapji, Founder (1987–2019)
- HDH Swamishri, President (2019–present)

- Gunatit Samaj —

- Kakaji Maharaj - Yogi Divine Society (1966-1986)
- Pappaji Maharaj - Gunatit Jyot (1966–2006)
- Hariprasad Swamiji Maharaj - Haridham Sokhada, HSAPSS (1966–2021)
- Premswarup Swamiji Maharaj, President-Haridham Sokhada, HSAPSS (2021-Present)
- Aksharvihari Swamiji Maharaj - Shri Akshar Purushottam Satsang Kendra (1966–2019)
- Jashbhai Sahebji - Anoopam Mission (1966–present)

- Swaminarayan Gadi (Maninagar) —

- Purushottampriyadasji Swami (1979-2020)
- Jitendrapriyadasji Swami (2020-present)

=== Hindu new movements ===
- Art of Living Foundation — Sri Sri Ravishankar, Spiritual Leader, Humanitarian (1981–present)
- Brahma Kumaris — Dadi Janki, Spiritual Head (1937–2020)
- Isha Foundation — Sadhguru Jaggi Vasudev (1992–present)
- Jagadguru Kripalu Parishat — Vishaka Tripathi, Shyama Tripathi & Krishna Tripathi, Presidents (present)
- Mahanam Sampraday —

- Upashak Bandhu Bhramachariji (India) (present)
- Kanti Bandhu Bhramachariji (Bangladesh) (present)

- Mata Amritanandamayi Math — Mata Amritanandamayi, Spiritual Leader, Humanitarian (1981–present)
- Ramakrishna Mission/Vedanta Society —

- Swami Ranganathananda, President (1998–2005)
- Swami Gahanananda, President (2005–2007)
- Swami Atmasthananda, President (2007–2017)
- Swami Smaranananda, President (2017–2024)
- Swami Gautamananda, President (2024-present)

- Sri Chinmoy Centers — Sri Chinmoy (1966–2007)

== Islam ==
=== Pan-Islamic ===
- Organisation of Islamic Cooperation —

- List of secretaries-general

=== Sunni ===
==== International ====
- Barelvi movement

- Dawat-e-Islami —

- Muhammad Ilyas Qadri, Amir of Ahlussunnah–Emir of Sunnis (1981–present)

- Sunni Dawate Islami —

- Shakir Ali Noori, Ameer (1990–present)

- World Islamic Mission —

- Qamaruzzaman Azmi, President (present)

- World Sunni Movement —

- Syed Mohammad Saifur Rahman, Chief Advisor (present)

- Deobandi movement —

- Taqi Usmani, Sheikh ul Islam (2004–present)
- Tablighi Jamaat —

- Zubairul Hasan Kandhlawi, Amir (1995–2014)
- position abolished (since 2014)

- International Islamic Council for Da'wah and Relief —

- Abdullah bin Abdulaziz Al-Musleh, Secretary-General (present)
- Muslim World League

- Abdallah Ben Abdel Mohsen At-Turki (2000–2016)
- Muhammad bin Abdul Karim Issa, Secretary General (2016–present)

- World Muslim Congress

- President

- Abdullah Omar Nasseef (1993–2025)

- Secretary General

- Raja Zafar-ul-Haq (present)

- Muslim Brotherhood

- Mustafa Mashhur, General Guide (1996–2002)
- Ma'mun al-Hudaybi, General Guide (2002–2004)
- Mohammed Mahdi Akef, General Guide (2004–2010)
- Mohammed Badie, General Guide (2010–present)

==== Afghanistan ====
- Taliban —

- Mohammed Omar, Amir (1994–2013)
- Akhtar Mansour, Amir (2015–2016)
- Hibatullah Akhundzada, Amir (2016–present)

==== Australia ====
- Grand Mufti of Australia

- Taj El-Din Hilaly (1992–2007)
- Fehmi Naji (2007–2011)
- Ibrahim Abu Mohamed (2011–2018)
- Abdel Aziem Al-Afifi (2018)
- Ibrahim Abu Mohamed (2018–present)

==== Bosnia and Herzegovina ====
- Islamic Community in Bosnia and Herzegovina —

- Mustafa Cerić, Grand Mufti (1993–2012)
- Husein Kavazović, Grand Mufti (2012–2026)
- Nedžad Grabus, Grand Mufti (2026–present)

==== China ====
- Islamic Association of China —

- Xilalunding Chen Guangyuan, President (present)

==== Indonesia ====
- Indonesian Ulema Council —

- Sahal Mahfudh, chairman (2000–2014)
- Din Syamsuddin, chairman (2014–2015)
- Ma'ruf Amin, chairman (2015–2020)
- Miftachul Achyar, chairman (2020–2023)
- Anwar Iskandar, chairman (2023–present)

- Muhammadiyah —

- Ahmad Syafi'i Maarif (1998–2005)
- Din Syamsuddin (2005–2015)
- Haedar Nashir (2015–present)

- Nahdlatul Ulama —

- Spiritual leader

- Sahal Mahfudz (1999–2014)
- Mustofa Bisri (2014, temporary)
- Ma'ruf Amin (2015–2018)
- Miftachul Akhyar (2018–present)

- Chairman

- Hasyim Muzadi (1999–2010)
- Said Aqil Siradj (2010–2021)
- Yahya Cholil Staquf (2021–present)

==== Israel and Palestine ====
- Grand Mufti of Jerusalem —

- Ekrima Sa'id Sabri (1994–2006)
- Muhammad Ahmad Hussein (2006–present)

==== Kazakhstan ====
- Spiritual Administration of the Muslims of Kazakhstan —

- Absattar Derbisali, Grand Mufti (2000–2013)
- Yerzhan Malgajyuly Mayamerov, Grand Mufti (2013–present)

==== Malaysia ====
- Fatwa Committee of the National Council for Islamic Religious Affairs —

- Ismail Ibrahim, Chairman (2000–2005)
- Abdul Shukor Husin, Chairman (2005–2017)
- Wan Zahidi bin Wan Teh, Chairman (2017–2022)
- Nooh Gadut, Chairman (2022–present)

==== North Macedonia ====
- Islamic Religious Community of Macedonia —

- Zejnulla Fazliu, Islamic religious leader (1990–present)

==== Russia ====
- Central Spiritual Administration of the Muslims of Russia —

- Talgat Tadzhuddin, Shaikh al-Islam, Grand Mufti (1992–present)

- Spiritual Administration of the Muslims of Russian Federation and Russian Council of Muftis —

- Rawil Ğaynetdin, Grand Mufti (2014–present) and Chairman (1996–present)

- Spiritual Assembly of the Muslims of Russia —

- Albir Krganov, Mufti (2016–present)

- Spiritual Administration of the Muslims of the Asian Part of Russia —

- Nafigulla Ashirov, Mufti (1997–present)

- Coordinating Center of North Caucasus Muslims —

- Magomed Albogachiev, Chairman (1998–2003)
- Ismail Berdiyev, Chairman (2003–2024)

- Spiritual Administration of the Muslims of the Republic of Adygea and Krasnodar Krai —

- Askarbiy Kardanov, Mufti (2012–present)

- Spiritual Administration of the Muslims of the Republic of Bashkortostan —

- Ainur Birgalin, Mufti (2019–present)

- Spiritual Administration of the Muslims of the Chechen Republic —

- Akhmad Shamaiev, Mufti (2000–2005)
- Sultan Mirsayev, Mufti (2005–2014)
- Salah Mezhiev, Mufti (2014–present)

- Muftiate of the Republic of Dagestan —

- Ahmad Afandi Abdulaev, Mufti (1998–present)

- Spiritual Administration of the Muslims of the Republic of Ingushetia

- Muhammed Alboghatchiev, Mufti

- Spiritual Administration of the Muslims of the Kabardino-Balkarian Republic —

- Hazrataliy Dzasejev, Mufti (2010–present)

- Spiritual Administration of the Muslims of the Karachay-Cherkess Republic —

- Ismail Berdiyev, Mufti (1991–2024)

- Spiritual Administration of the Muslims of the Republic of North Ossetia–Alania —

- Khajimurat Gatsalov, Mufti (2011–present)

- Spiritual Administration of the Muslims of the Republic of Tatarstan —

- Ğosman İsxaqi, Mufti (1998–2011)
- Ildus Faiz, Mufti (2011–2013)
- Kamil Samigullin, Mufti (2013–present)

==== Saudi Arabia ====
- Council of Senior Scholars and Permanent Committee for Scholarly Research and Ifta —

- Abdulaziz Al Sheikh, Grand Mufti of Saudi Arabia (1999–2025)
- Salih al‑Fawzan (2025-present)

==== Taiwan ====
- Chinese Muslim Association —

- Ma Jiazhen, President (1996–2002)
- Ni Anguo, President (2002–2006)
- Ma Ruhu, President (2006–2008)
- Dawood Cho Yong-tsing, President (2008–present)

==== Ukraine ====
- Spiritual Direction of the Muslims of Crimea (Kyiv) —

- Kirim Esende, Mufti

- Spiritual Directorate of the Muslims of Crimea (Simferopol) —

- Emirali Ablaev, Mufti (1999–present)

- Spiritual Directorate of Muslims of Ukraine —

- Tamim Ahmed Muhamed Mutah, Mufti

- Spiritual Administration of Muslims of Ukraine "Ummah" —

- Said Ismagilov, Mufti

==== Uzbekistan ====
- Muslim Board of Uzbekistan

- Abdurashid Kori Bakhromov, Grand Mufti (1995–2006)
- Usman Alimov, Grand Mufti (2006–2021)
- Nuriddin Kholiqnazarov, Grand Mufti (2021–present)

==== Yemen ====
- Dar al-Mustafa —

- Al-Habib Umar bin Hafidz (1997–present)

=== Shia ===
==== Twelver ====
- Imams (complete list) –

- Muhammad al-Mahdi, Imam (874–present) Shia belief holds that he was hidden by Allah in 874.

- Marja' (current list)

- Mohammad-Taqi Bahjat Foumani (1993–2009)
- Mohammad Fazel Lankarani (1980–2007)
- Ali Khamenei (1985–2026)
- Muhammad Saeed al-Hakim (1981–2021)
- Hossein Noori-Hamedani(2000–present)
- Muhammad al-Fayadh (1980–2026)
- Ali al-Sistani (1980–present)
- Naser Makarem Shirazi (1998–present)
- Hossein Waheed Khorasani (1995–2026)
- Lotfollah Safi Golpaygani (1975–2022)

- Ahl Al-Bayt World Assembly

- Ali Akbar Velayati, General Secretary
- Mohammad Mahdi Asefi, General Secretary
- Mohammad Hasan Akhtari, General Secretary (present)

- Bektashi Order –

- Baba Reshat (1991–2011)
- Baba Mondi (2011–present)

- Religious Council of the Caucasus —

- Allahshukur Pashazadeh, Grand Mufti of the Caucasus (1992–present)

==== Ismaili ====
- Dawoodi Bohras –

- Mohammed Burhanuddin, 52nd Da'i al-Mutlaq (1965–2014)
- Mufaddal Saifuddin, 53rd Da'i al-Mutlaq (2014–present)

- Alawi Bohras

- Abu Haatim Tayyib Ziyauddin, 44th Da'i al-Mutlaq (1974-2015)
- Haatim Zakiyuddin, 45th Da'i al-Mutlaq (2015-present)

- Nizari Ismailism (complete list) –

- Aga Khan IV, 49th Imam (1957–2025)
- Aga Khan V, 50th Imam (2025-present)

==== Zaidiyyah ====
- Houthis –

- Hussein Badreddin al-Houthi, leader (1994–2004)
- Badreddin al-Houthi, leader (2004)
- Abdul-Malik Badreddin al-Houthi, leader (2004–present)

=== Ahmadiyya ===
- Ahmadiyya Community –

- Khalifatul Masih IV, Mirza Tahir Ahmad (1982–2003)
- Khalifatul Masih V, Mirza Masroor Ahmad (2003–present)

- Lahore Ahmadiyya Movement –

- Asghar Hameed (1996–2002)
- Abdul Karim Saeed Pasha (2003–2022)

=== Nation of Islam ===
- Nation of Islam –

- Louis Farrakhan, head, (1981–present)

=== Ibadi ===
- Ahmed bin Hamad al-Khalili, Grand Mufti of the Sultanate of Oman
- Haitham bin Tariq (2015-present), Sultan of Oman

== Judaism ==
Asia

- Israel, (complete list) —

- Ashkenazi

- Israel Meir Lau, Ashkenazi Chief Rabbi (1993–2003)
- Yona Metzger, Ashkenazi Chief Rabbi (2003–2013)
- David Lau, Ashkenazi Chief Rabbi (2013–2024)
- Kalman Ber, Ashkenazi Chief Rabbi (2024–present)

- Sephardic

- Eliyahu Bakshi-Doron, Sephardic Chief Rabbi (1993–2003)
- Shlomo Amar, Sephardic Chief Rabbi (2003–2013)
- Yitzhak Yosef, Sephardic Chief Rabbi (2013–2024)
- David Yosef, Sephardic Chief Rabbi (2024–present)

- Military Rabbinate

- Israel Weiss, Chief Rabbi (2000–2006)
- Avichai Rontzki, Chief Rabbi (2006–2010)
- Rafi Peretz, Chief Rabbi (2010–2016)
- Eyal Karim, Chief Rabbi (2016–present)

Eurasia

- Russia —

- Congress of the Jewish Religious Organizations and Associations in Russia –

- Adolf Shayevich, Chief Rabbi of Russia (1993–present)

- Federation of Jewish Communities of Russia –

- Berel Lazar, Chief Rabbi of Russia (2000–present)

- Turkey —

- David Asseo, Chief Rabbi (1961–2002)
- Ishak Haleva, Chief Rabbi (2002–2025)

Europe

- Ireland —

- Yaakov Pearlman, Chief Rabbi (2001–2008)
- Zalman Lent, Acting Chief Rabbi (2008–present)

United Kingdom and the Commonwealth of Nations

- Chief Rabbis of the United Hebrew Congregations —

- Jonathan Sacks, Chief Rabbi (1991–2013)
- Ephraim Mirvis, Chief Rabbi (2013–present)

North America

- Union for Reform Judaism (North America) –

- Eric Yoffie, President (1996–2012)
- Richard Jacobs, President (2012–present)

== New religious movements ==
=== Baháʼí Faith ===
- Baháʼí Faith, Universal House of Justice
  - Ali Nakhjavani (1963–2003)
  - Hushmand Fatheazam (1963–2003)
  - Ian Semple (1963–2005)
  - Glenford Mitchell (1982–2008)
  - Peter Khan (1987–2010)
  - Adib Taherzadeh (1988–2000)
  - Hooper Dunbar (1988–2010)
  - J. Douglas Martin (1993–2005)
  - Farzam Arbab (1993–2013)
  - Kiser Barnes (2000–2013)
  - Hartmut Grossman (2003–2008)
  - Firaydoun Javaheri (2003–2018)
  - Paul Lample (2005–present)
  - Payman Mohajer (2005–present)
  - Gustavo Correa (2008–2013)
  - Shahriar Razavi (2008–present)
  - Stephen Hall (2010–2023)
  - Stephen Birkland (2010–2023)
  - Ayman Rouhani (2013–present)
  - Chuungu Malitonga (2013–present)
  - Praveen Mallik (2018–present)
  - Juan Francisco Mora (2018–present)
  - Andrej Donoval (2023–present)
  - Albert Nshisu Nsunga (2023–present)

=== Radha Soami ===
- Radha Soami Satsang Beas —
  - Gurinder Singh, Guru (1990–present)
- Radja Soami Satsang Dayalbagh —
  - Makund Behari Lal, Guru (1975–2002)
  - Prem Saran Satsangi, Guru (2002–present)
- Radha Swami Satsang, Dinod —
  - Huzur Kanwar Saheb, Guru (present)
- Ruhani Satsang —
  - Thakar Singh, Guru (1976–2005)

=== Scientology ===
- Church of Scientology —
  - David Miscavige, President of Scientology; Chairman of the Board of the Religious Technology Center (1987–present)
  - Heber Jentzsch, President of the Church of Scientology International (1982–c. 2010)

=== Others ===
- Eckankar —
  - Harold Klemp, Mahanta (1981–2025)
  - Doug Kunin, (2025-present)
- Elan Vital — Prem Rawat (1983–present)
- Falun Gong — Li Hongzhi, Spiritual Master (1992–present)
- Guanyin Famen — Ching Hai, Supreme Master (1988–present)
- LaVeyan Satanism — Peter H. Gilmore, Magus (2001–present)
- Movement of Spiritual Inner Awareness —
  - John-Roger Hinkins, Spiritual Director (1971–2014)
  - John K. Morton, Spiritual Director (2014–present)
- Science of Spirituality — Rajinder Singh, Spiritual Master (1989–present)
- Tenrikyo — Nakayama Zenji, Shinbashira (1998–present)

== Other ==
=== Jainism ===
- Śvētāmbara Terapanth —
  - Shri Mahapragya, Acharya (1997–2010)
  - Mahashraman (2010–present)

=== Mandaeism ===
- Sattar Jabbar Hilo

=== Ravidassia ===
- Niranjan Dass, Sant (2007–present)

=== Shinto ===
- Shinto (complete list) —
  - Akihito, Emperor of Japan, head of Shinto (1989–2019)
  - Naruhito, Emperor of Japan, head of Shinto (2019–present)
- Jinja Honcho —
  - Atsuko Ikeda, Chairperson (1988–present)

==== Sectarian Shinto ====
- Konkokyo –
  - Heiki Konko, Spiritual Leader (1991–present)
- Kurozumikyō –
  - Kurozumi Muneharu, Chief Patriarch (1973–2017)
  - Kurozumi Munemichi, Chief Patriarch (2017–present)

=== Taoism ===
- Zhengyi Dao (complete list) —
  - Zhang Yuanxian, Celestial Master (1971–2008)

=== Unitarian Universalism ===
- Unitarian Universalist Association –
  - William G. Sinkford, President (2001–2009)
  - Peter Morales, President (2009–2017)
  - Susan Frederick-Gray, President (2017–2023)
  - Sofía Betancourt, President (2023–present)

=== Voodoo / Vodun ===
- Beninese Vodun
  - Adanyroh Guèdèhounguè, President of National Community of Voodoo Cults of Benin (CNCVB)
  - Daagbo Hounon Houna II, Supreme Leader of Vodun
- Haitian Vodou
  - Demanbre — Augustin St. Clou, King of Voodoo (2016–present)
  - National Confederation of Haitian Vodouisants (KNVA) — Prospère Louidor, National Ati (Supreme Voodoo Chief) (2021–present)

=== Spiritual Genuinity ===
- Mokshadharma —
  - Founded by Amit Goyal (2019-present)
  - Started at a badminton court in Sydney where the idea was playing honestly and how it depicts the peace in this world.

== See also ==
- Religious leaders by year
- List of state leaders in the 21st century
- List of governors of dependent territories in the 21st century
