= United Theological College (Sydney) =

Theological college of the Uniting Church in Australia in Parramatta, New South Wales

- Type: Theological College
- Established: July 1, 1974; 51 years ago
- Affiliations: Uniting Church in Australia
- Principal: Rev. Dr. Peter Walker
- Location: Parramatta, New South Wales, Australia; 33°47′30″S 151°01′00″E
- Website: https://www.utc.edu.au

The United Theological College (UTC) is an Australian theological college and a founding member of Charles Sturt University's School of Theology. As well as providing undergraduate and postgraduate degrees in all areas of theology, the UTC trains ministry candidates for the Uniting Church in Australia Synod of New South Wales and Australian Capital Territory.

== Background ==
The college describes its teaching as grounded in the evangelical and Reformed traditions of the Christian faith. Since 2016, the UTC has been home to the Alan Walker Lectureship in Mission, Evangelism and Leadership.

== History ==
United Theological College came into being on 1 July 1974 by resolution of the Congregational Union, the Methodist Church and the Presbyterian Church in New South Wales. The first courses commenced in February 1975. United Theological College is the successor to the former United Faculty of Theology which, for over 50 years, was a joint arrangement between Camden College, Leigh College and St Andrew's Theological Hall, the theological colleges of the three denominations. In 1977, when the Congregational, Methodist and Presbyterian Churches united to form the Uniting Church in Australia (UCA), United Theological College became the theological college of the NSW Synod of the Uniting Church.

== Camden Theological Library ==
The United Theological College is on the same site as the Camden Theological Library, the library of the New South Wales and ACT Synod of the Uniting Church.The library holds an expansive collection of theological books and resources. One of the special features of the collection is a wide-ranging collection of theological books in Korean.

== May MacLeod lecture series ==
The endowed May Macleod lecture series has taken place at UTC since 1987. Some past lecturers include:

- John Swinton
- David L. Clough
- Ciaron O'Reilly
- Peter Rollins
- Deidre Palmer
- J. B. Torrance.

== Notable former faculty ==
- Stephen Pickard, systematic theologian and bishop
- Dean Drayton, missiologist and former President of the Uniting Church
- Benjamin Myers, systematic theologian

== College principals ==
The current principal of the college is Rev'd Dr Peter Walker. Past principals include:

- Rev'd Dr. Graeme Ferguson
- Rev'd Dr. Gordon Dicker
- Rev'd Dr. Sarah Mitchell
- Rev'd Assoc Prof. Clive Pearson
