= Deidre Palmer =

Australian theologian and social worker

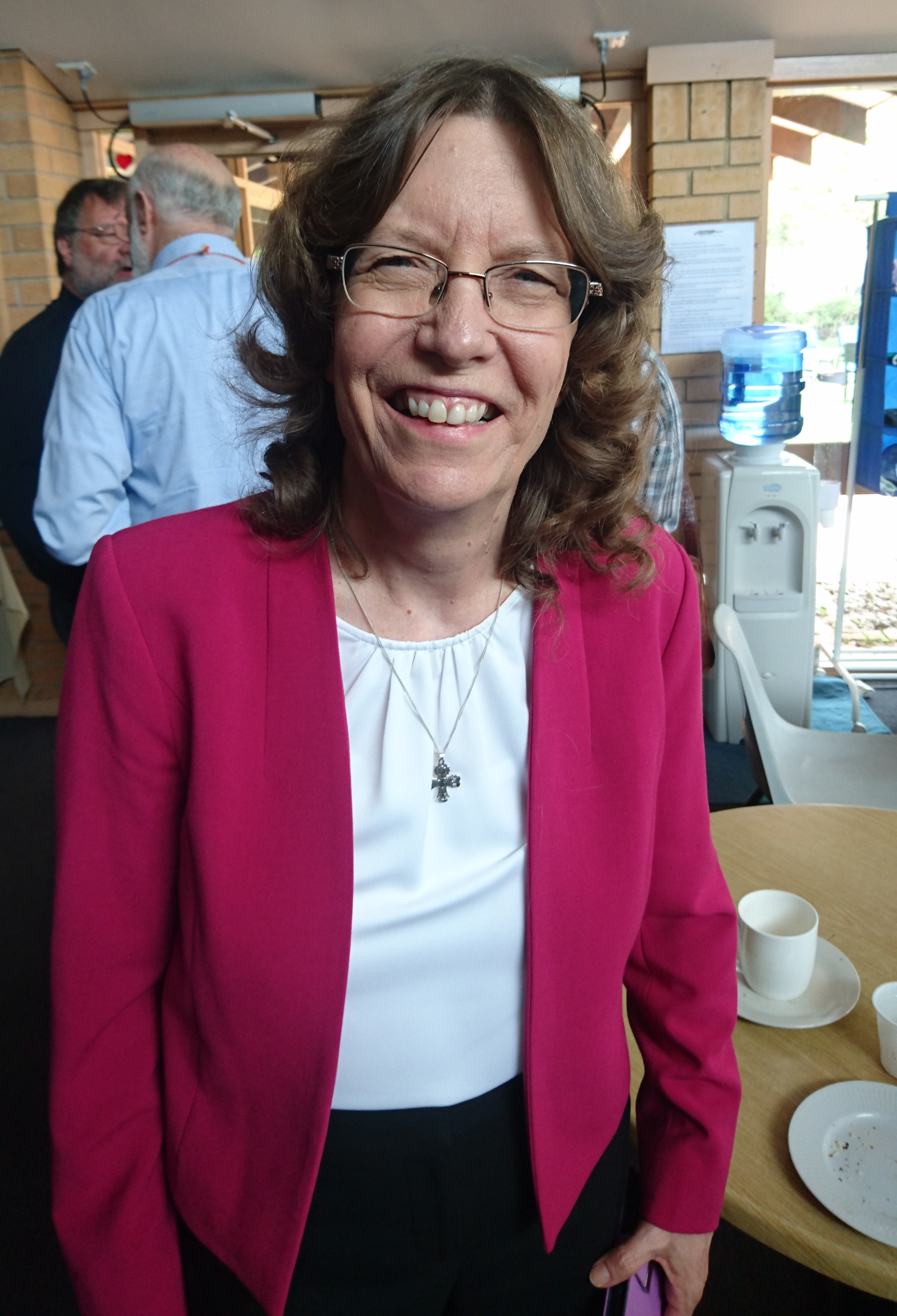

President of the Assembly, Uniting Church in Australia
- In office 2018–2021
- Preceded by: Stuart McMillan
- Succeeded by: Sharon Hollis

Moderator, Synod of South Australia UCA
- In office 2013–2016
- Preceded by: Rob Williams
- Succeeded by: Sue Ellis

Personal details
- Born: 1955 or 1956 (age 70–71)
- Spouse: Lawrie Palmer
- Children: 2
- Education: Duke University, Boston College, Flinders University
- Occupation: Lecturer, counsellor, theologian, social worker
- Website: Flinders University

Deidre Palmer is an Australian counsellor, theologian, and social worker who was the President of the Uniting Church in Australia from 8 July 2018 until 17 July 2021. She was the Moderator of the Uniting Church's Synod of South Australia from 2013 to 2016.

== Education ==
Palmer has a Master of Religious Education from Duke University, a Doctor of Philosophy (PhD) in Religious Education and Theology from Boston College and a Master of Social Work from Flinders University.

Palmer is on the academic faculty at the Uniting College for Leadership and Theology (Parkin-Wesley) in the Adelaide College of Divinity of Flinders University (South Australia). She has previously had a teaching role at the Perkins School of Theology of Southern Methodist University, (Dallas, Texas, USA).

== Career ==
Palmer's roles within the Uniting Church in Australia have included as a counsellor with the Uniting Communities childhood sexual abuse counselling team, serving on Assembly Committees including the Uniting Education Reference Group, the Board of Coolamon College, the Assembly Commission for Mission, National Mission and Evangelism, and the Assembly Commission for Liturgy, member of the Assembly Standing Committee, the Formation, Education and Discipleship Working Group, the UCA's National Task Group responding to the Royal Commission into Institutional Responses to Child Sexual Abuse, the Church Polity Reference Committee, and the Assembly Business Committee and Moderator of the Synod of South Australia (2013–2016).

Palmer was elected at the 14th Triennial Assembly on 16 July 2015 to become President-elect to commence her term as president in 2018. She was installed as president at the opening of the 15th Assembly, at a worship service at St Michael's Uniting Church, Melbourne. Palmer was the second woman to be appointed to the role of President, following Dr Jill Tabart who served in the role from 1994 to 1997.

A few days after her installation as president, Palmer presided over the election of her successor. Reverend Sharon Hollis, the moderator of the Synod of Victoria and Tasmania, was elected to take on the role of President from the beginning of the sixteenth assembly to be held in Queensland in 2021, however, due to COVID-19 the event was hosted there but held online.

== Personal life ==
Palmer is married to Lawrie Palmer and they have two adult daughters. They attend Rosefield Uniting Church in Adelaide.

Religious titles
Preceded by Stuart McMillan	President of the Assembly, Uniting Church in Australia; July 2018 - July 2021	Succeeded by Rev Sharon Hollis
