= Steve Taylor (missiologist) =

New Zealand pastor and missiologist (born 1968)

Steve Taylor (born 1968) is a New Zealand pastor and missiologist. He is a leading voice in the emerging church movement in New Zealand.

Taylor has degrees from Lincoln University, the University of Auckland, and the University of Otago. He served as the senior pastor of Opawa Baptist Church, and the founding pastor of Graceway Baptist Church in Ellerslie, New Zealand. Taylor taught at Carey Baptist College, Laidlaw College and Flinders University before serving as Principal of the Uniting College for Leadership and Theology from 2012 to 2015. He then took up the position of Principal of the Presbyterian Church of Aotearoa New Zealand's Knox Centre for Ministry and Leadership, serving from 2015 to 2021.

Taylor has written The Out of Bounds Church?: Learning to Create a Community of Faith in a Culture of Change (2005), Built for change: A practical theology of innovation and collaboration (2016), and First Expressions: Innovation and the Mission of God (2019). He is co-editor of the journal Ecclesial Futures, and editor of Colloquium, the journal of the Australian and New Zealand Association of Theological Studies.
