= Andrew Dutney =

The Reverend Andrew Dutney
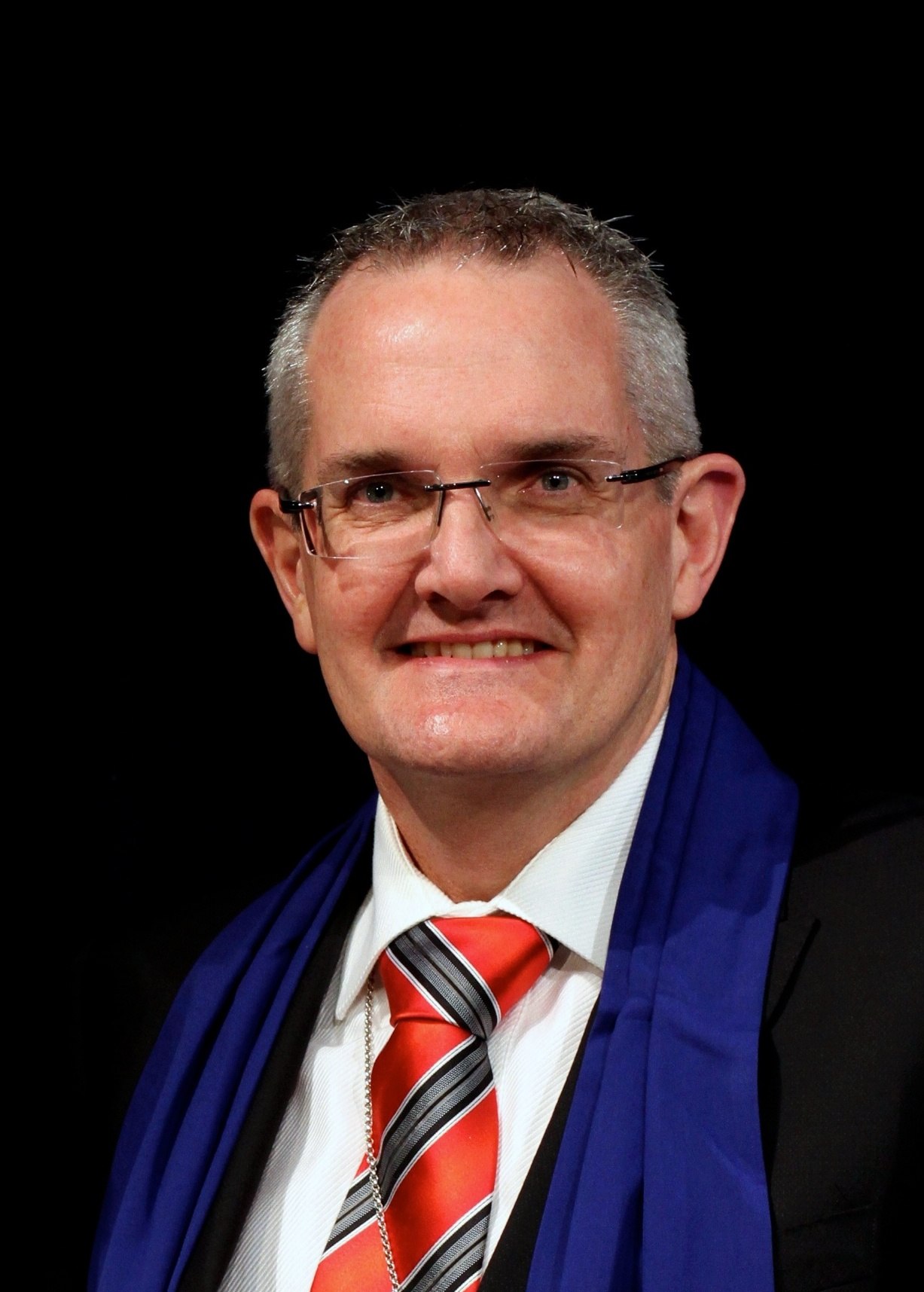

President of the Assembly, Uniting Church in Australia
- In office 2012–2015
- Preceded by: The Rev. Alistair Macrae
- Succeeded by: Mr Stuart McMillan

Professor, Flinders University, Department of Theology
- Incumbent
- Assumed office 2010

Principal, Uniting College for Leadership and Theology, Adelaide
- Incumbent
- Assumed office 2009
- Preceded by: Principal, Parkin-Wesley College (since 2001)
- Succeeded by: Rev. Steve Taylor

Principal, Uniting College for Leadership and Theology, Adelaide
- In office 2016 – December 2021
- Preceded by: Rev. Steve Taylor

Personal details
- Born: 9 July 1958 (age 68) Charleville, Queensland, Australia
- Spouse: Heather Dutney (m. 1977)
- Children: Frazer McVeigh Dutney (dec.)
- Education: Trinity Theological College (1980), University of Queensland (1981), St Andrews University (1982, 1985), Flinders University (1998, 2008)
- Occupation: University lecturer, Uniting Church minister

Reverend Professor Andrew Fergus Dutney (/ˈduːtniː/ DYOOT-nee; born 9 July 1958) is a Christian scholar, writer, and musician. He is a Professor within the College of Humanities Arts and Social Sciences, Flinders University. He is the former principal of Uniting College for Leadership and Theology (the Uniting Church in Australia theological college in South Australia) and a past President of the Assembly of the Uniting Church. He was installed in the position of president on 15 July 2012 on the first day of the Uniting Church's 13th triennial assembly meeting in Adelaide, handing over 12 July 2015 to Mr Stuart McMillan. His installation service took place before around 3000 people at the Adelaide Entertainment Centre. Dutney returned to his previous role as Principal of Uniting College for Leadership and Theology at the conclusion of his term as President.

== Early life ==
Andrew Dutney was born in Charleville in south-west Queensland, the third of five children. He lived there with his family until the age of seven, when the family moved to Brisbane. He attended the Taringa State Primary School and Brisbane Boys' College, after which he studied at the University of Queensland, graduating with a BA in 1981. He married Heather Ann Woods on 17 December 1977. Their only child, Frazer McVeigh Dutney, died in infancy. Dutney was accepted as a candidate for the ministry of the word in 1977 and began training at Trinity Theological College in Brisbane in February 1978. He completed his studies there in November 1980 at the age of 22. After working as the titles clerk at Cannon and Peterson solicitors for nine months, he and his wife relocated to Scotland where he took up post-graduate studies at the University of St Andrews on the east coast of Fife.

== Academic career and ordained ministry ==
After completing a Postgraduate Diploma in Ecumenical Studies at St Andrews in 1982, he went on to complete his first doctorate in 1985. His Doctor of Philosophy thesis, "The Development of the Understanding of Ministry in the Australian Church Union Negotiations 1957–1971", was awarded the University of St Andrews' Samuel Rutherford Thesis Prize. During his time in Scotland, he also served as a minister at St Andrew's Parish Church, Leven (Church of Scotland). He was ordained to the ministry of the word by the Presbytery of Brisbane while he was serving in Leven at a service conducted in Leven by the Presbytery of Brisbane with the attendance of members of the Church of Scotland presbyteries of Kirkcaldy and St Andrews.

He returned to Australia in 1985 to take up a position as the chaplain at Wesley College and the University of Sydney, as well as minister of the Wesley College Chapel Parish.

In 1989 he and his wife moved to Adelaide for him to take up a position as lecturer in Systematic Theology at Parkin-Wesley Theological College. He was appointed as principal of the college in 2001 and was the foundation principal when Parkin-Wesley College was reconstituted as the Uniting College for Leadership and Theology in 2009. The Rev. Dr. Steve Taylor was appointed principal of the college while Andrew Dutney served his term as President of the Assembly.

In 1998 Andrew Dutney was appointed as the foundation Director of the Flinders University/Adelaide College of Divinity Centre for Theology, Science & Culture, a position he held until 2001. In 2008 he completed his second doctorate, a Doctor of Education degree at Flinders University. He gained the full academic status of professor in Flinders University's Department of Theology in 2010. He was the President of the Adelaide College of Divinity from 2010 to 2012. In 2016, in addition to his role as principal of Uniting College, Andrew Dutney was appointed as the Executive Officer of the newly formed Mission & Leadership Development department within the Synod of South Australia. In 2021, Andrew Dutney withdrew from each of his roles on medical advice. He resigned as Principal in April, and, in October, resigned from his positions as Executive Officer of Mission and Leadership Development, Executive Officer of the Adelaide College of Divinity, and as a senior academic within the faculty of Uniting College for Leadership and Theology.

== Bioethics ==
Dutney is a specialist in bioethics. He was a member of several Human Research Ethics committees, including those of the Royal Prince Alfred Hospital, Queen Elizabeth Hospital and the Adelaide College of Divinity. He was a member of the South Australian Council on Reproductive Technology from 1990 and its chairperson from 1996 to 2005.

In 2001 Dutney's book Playing God: Ethics and Faith (2001) was published by HarperCollins. The work was extensively cited by Robert French, who would later become the Chief Justice of the High Court of Australia, in French's scholarly article "Ethics at the Beginning and Ending of Life".

== Publications and media ==
Dutney is widely published on theology and ethics in both religious and mainstream publications and is a regular media commentator on ethics and spirituality.

Dutney has been a leading interpreter of the history and theology of the Uniting Church. His work Introducing the Uniting Church in Australia (The Assembly of the Uniting Church in Australia, 2008) has also been translated into Korean. Dutney is known for his passion for the Uniting Church's founding document, the Basis of Union. His other works include Manifesto for Renewal: The Shaping of a New Church (1986, 2nd Edition, fully revised and expanded, 2016), Food, Sex & Death: A Personal Account of Christianity (1993), Playing God: Ethics and Faith (2001), Where did the joy come from? Revisiting the Basis of Union (2001), and 'A Genuinely Educated Ministry': Three Studies on Theological Education in the Uniting Church in Australia (2007, 2nd Edition 2011), and Angels in This Wilderness: Reflections on the Journey of the Uniting Church in Australia (2020).

His book Backyard Theology (2011) draws on his experience as a regular commentator on ethics and spirituality on the Mornings program on radio station 891 ABC Adelaide with presenters Matthew Abraham and David Bevan.

== Musical works ==
Dutney has been a gospel singer and recording artist, releasing three albums Reason to Live (1978), I've Got Eyes (1980), and Eight Songs (1987). He has written many songs for worship which are in wide use and published in a variety of resources. Five of his songs are included in Life Overflowing: 13th Assembly Worship Resources (2012).

Religious titles
Preceded by Alistair Macrae	President of the Assembly, Uniting Church in Australia; July 2012 - July 2015	Succeeded by Stuart McMillan
