= Uniting Church in Australia, Synod of South Australia =

Church in Australia

The Synod of South Australia (also known as Uniting Church SA and formerly Presbytery and Synod of South Australia from 2005 to 2019) is the entity of the Uniting Church in Australia covering most of the state of South Australia. It is one of six geographically-based Synods of the church. The leader of the Synod is the Moderator elected to the position for a period of three years. The legal entity for the South Australian branch of the Uniting Church is The Uniting Church in Australia Property Trust (S.A.) The synod publishes a quarterly magazine, the New Times.

The Uniting Church has a series of inter-related councils, which do not strictly represent a hierarchy. The National Assembly is responsible for issues of doctrine. Each state has a Synod which is responsible for property. Presbyteries are regional councils responsible for the selection, training and oversight of ministers.

== Presbyteries and mission networks ==
A synod may relate to a number of Presbyteries within its bounds. From the beginning of July 2019, the single Presbytery of South Australia divided into a new Generate Presbytery and another Transitional Presbytery. Both presbyteries extend across the entire Synod geography and congregations had the opportunity to choose which presbytery they would belong to. The larger Transitional Presbytery was expected to further divide into two or three later in 2019 along geographical lines. It divided in November 2019 into two parts initially named Presbytery A (north of a line through the centre of Adelaide) and Presbytery B. In March 2020, these presbyteries adopted their new names of Wimala Presbytery and Presbytery of Southern SA.

The Synod of South Australia previously had seven presbyteries, but in 2005 the presbyteries merged, and the structure simplified so that there was one administration and series of meetings for both the Synod and the single Presbytery. As a consequence of the single presbytery having a quite large geographic extent, a series of "mission networks" were established giving congregations a way of relating to similarly-minded congregations and equipping congregations for mission and ministry.

The mission networks were:

- Community Outreach
- Grace Connections
- Gulf
- Hope Network
- Northern Rural
- Urban
- Western
- 3DNet

The original presbyteries in South Australia before 2005 were:

- Adelaide Northwest
- Eyre Peninsula
- Fleurieu
- Frome
- Mount Lofty
- South Eastern (later Presbytery of The Coorong)
- Wakefield

== Education ==
The Uniting College for Leadership and Theology is the theological college of the synod. It is a component of the Adelaide College of Divinity and draws its heritage from both Wesley Theological College and Parkin College.

There are a number of schools associated with the Uniting Church in South Australia. these are:

- Annesley College
- Pedare Christian College
- Prince Alfred College
- Scotch College, Adelaide
- Seymour College
- Westminster School, Adelaide

Lincoln College is a residential college for university students in North Adelaide close to the University of Adelaide.

== Moderators ==
years	name
2023-	Rev. Peter Morel
2019–2023	Mr. Bronte Wilson
2016–2019	Rev. Sue Ellis
2013–2016	Dr. Deidre Palmer
2010–2013	Rev. Rob Williams
2007–2010	Rev. Rod Dyson
2005–2007	Rev. Graham Vawser
2003–2005	Rev. Dr Graham Humphris
2001–2003	Mrs. Jan Trengove
1999–2001	Rev. Don Catford
1997–1999	Dr. Don Hopgood
1995–1997	Rev. Margaret Polkinghorne
1993–1995	Rev. Dr Dean Brookes
1991–1993	Rev. Neale Michael
1989–1991	Rev. John Maddern
1987–1989	Mrs. Elizabeth Finnegan
1985–1987	Rev. Dr. Charles Biggs
1983–1985	Rev. Michael Sawyer
1981–1983	Rev. Dr. D'Arcy Wood
1979–1981	Rev. Keith Smith
1977–1979	Rev. Ian B. Tanner

== General Secretaries ==
years	name
2023–	Rev. Philip Gardner
2022–2023	Rev. Philip Gardner and Rev. Sue Page (Interim co-General Secretary)
2019–2022	Rev. Felicity Amery
2018–2019	Rev Rob Brown (Interim General Secretary - Jan 2018 to Apr 2019)
2014–2018	Rev. Nigel Rogers
2006–2014	Rev. Dr. Graham Humphris
2000–2005	Rev. Stu Cameron (Ordained part way through his term)
1994–1999	Dr. Marelle Harisun
1988–1993	Rev. Don Catford
1977–1988	Rev. Kyle Waters

== See also ==
- Deacon Denise Mary Champion, first ordained Aboriginal person in South Australia
