= Dean Drayton =

Minister of the Uniting Church in Australia

Reverend Professor Dean Drayton
- Born: 1941 (age 84–85); Whyalla, South Australia, Australia
- Education: University of Adelaide, Melbourne College of Divinity, Chicago Theological Seminary
- Occupation: Minister of religion
- President of the Assembly
- Church: Uniting Church in Australia
- Installed: July 2003
- Term ended: July 2006
- Predecessor: James Haire
- Successor: Gregor Henderson
- Moderator of the Synod of New South Wales
- Church: Uniting Church in Australia
- Installed: 1995
- Term ended: 1996
- Successor: Rev. Dr. Donald Evans

Rodney Dean Drayton (born 1941) is a minister of the Uniting Church in Australia (UCA) and was President of the UCA Assembly from July 2003 to July 2006. He lectures on a part-time basis in missiology at Sydney's United Theological College (UTC).

== Biography ==
Drayton was born in Whyalla, South Australia in 1941. He spent his childhood growing up in the suburbs of Adelaide. He has received a BSc (Hons) from the University of Adelaide, a BD from the Melbourne College of Divinity and a PhD from the Chicago Theological Seminary.

A former geophysicist, Drayton was ordained as a minister in 1969 in Kent Town, South Australia. He served as a minister in three congregations, Westbourne Park and Salisbury in South Australia and DePue, Illinois in the United States while writing his doctoral thesis. He then worked as a consultant for evangelism for the Synod of South Australia for five years followed by 16 years as the executive director of the Board of Mission in the Synod of New South Wales. He was the moderator of the New South Wales Synod (October 1995–October 1996) and had Pilgrim in the Cosmos published in 1996. During 1997, he spent time as a visiting professor in evangelism at the Southern Methodist University's Perkins School of Theology in Dallas, Texas. In 1999 he was appointed a lecturer in theology (missiology and evangelism) at the United Theological College in Sydney, where he is a member of the adjunct faculty (2010).

Drayton has been a member of the UCA Assembly's National Mission and Evangelism Committee from 1985 to 1998 and a member of the standing committee from 1985 until 2009. He has travelled widely in Australia practicing evangelism and mission, worked extensively with the Uniting Aboriginal and Islander Christian Congress and with the NSW Synod Pacific Island Council and Synod Korean Advisory Council.

Drayton was President of the Uniting Church in Australia from July 2003 to July 2006 at a time when there was controversy over the church's position on male and female homosexual Christians, particularly clergy, and took a conciliatory leadership role.

Drayton is the author of Pilgrim in the Cosmos (1996) and Which Gospel? (2005), as well as other studies and articles on mission, evangelism and the contemporary mission context.

Religious titles
Preceded by James Haire	President of the Assembly, Uniting Church in Australia; July 2003-July 2006	Succeeded by Gregor Henderson
