= John Mavor (Australia) =

John E. Mavor
- Born: 1933 or 1934 (age 91–92)
- Occupation: Minister
- Known for: 8th President of the Assembly of the Uniting Church in Australia
- Spouse: Rae
- Awards: Member of the Order of Australia

Ecclesiastical career
- Religion: Christian
- Church: Uniting Church in Australia

Reverend John Mavor AM is an Australian minister of religion. He was the 8th president of the Uniting Church in Australia, serving in that role from 1997 to 2000.

He was accepted as a candidate for the Methodist Church of Australasia in 1954. Mavor worked for the Queensland Synod as director of Mission and Parish Services, then as the Moderator of the Synod from 1988 to 1989. He was President of the Assembly for a three-year term from 1998 to 2000. He later worked as a project officer for Uniting International Mission then acting National Director for 15 months. He retired in April 2007.

He was conferred membership of the Order of Australia in the 1999 Australia Day Honours.

Religious titles
| Preceded by Jill Tabart | President of the Assembly, Uniting Church in Australia; July 1997 – July 2000 | Succeeded by Rev. Prof. James Haire |
