= James Haire =

Theologian and Christian minister of religion

The Reverend James Haire
- Born: Ian James Mitchell Haire; 2 July 1946 (age 80); Northern Ireland
- Occupations: UCA and Presbyterian Church in Ireland minister and theologian
- Parent(s): James Loughridge Mitchell 'Jimmie' and Margaret Haire nee Mitchell

Ian James Mitchell Haire AC KSJ (born 2 July 1946, Northern Ireland) is a theologian and Christian minister of religion. He is emeritus professor of theology of Charles Sturt University, Canberra, Australia and past executive director of the Australian Centre for Christianity and Culture. He was formerly the fourth president of the National Council of Churches in Australia and the ninth president of the Uniting Church in Australia.

== Education ==
Haire was educated at the Royal Belfast Academical Institution (Inchmarlo Preparatory School and Main School), and at Worcester College, University of Oxford, where he studied classics and theology as an open exhibitioner, and was a rower. He graduated with a B.A. (Hons), which became an M.A., in theology.

He undertook management training in Britain and Europe, and then postgraduate theological studies in Leiden (GradDipMiss), Birmingham (GradCertMiss) and Belfast (Ordination Training). His Ph.D. in theology is from the University of Birmingham (PhD Theology, 1981).

=== Honorary degrees ===
He has received the following honorary degrees

- Doctor of Divinity (D.D., honoris causa) from the Presbyterian Theological Faculty, Ireland (PTFI), Belfast in 1999,
- Doctor of the University (D.Univ., honoris causa) from Griffith University, Queensland Australia in 2000,
- Doctor of Letters (D.Litt., honoris causa) from Ulster University, Northern Ireland in 2006, and
- Doctor of the University (D.Univ., honoris causa) from the Australian Catholic University in 2011.

== Work ==
Haire was ordained as a Christian minister in 1972. During part of 1972 he served in the Presbyterian congregations of Kells, Co. Meath and Ervey, Co. Cavan, in the Republic of Ireland. From 1972 to 1985 he was a missionary of the Presbyterian Church in Ireland, serving in Halmahera in the Molucca Islands and Sulawesi, Indonesia, where he worked as a lecturer and principal at Halmahera Theological College, and as professor of theology at the Christian University of Indonesia at Tomohon, Sulawesi. He served as a minister of the Evangelical Christian Church in Halmahera, Indonesia from 1972 to 1985, and continues to be a minister of that Church.

Haire served as Uniting Church minister of Darwin City Parish (Darwin Memorial Church) (Northern Territory, Australia) from 1985 to 1986, and also lectured at Nungalinya College, Darwin, during those years.

From 1987 to 2003, he was professor of New Testament studies at Trinity Theological College, Brisbane (subsequently Trinity College Queensland), and was principal of Trinity College from 1992 to 2000. During those years he also lectured, and supervised research higher degrees, at the University of Queensland. He was also the dean of the Brisbane College of Theology from 1991 to 1997, and president of the Brisbane College of Theology from 1997 to 1999. In addition, he was professor of theology at Griffith University in Brisbane, and was head of the School of Theology at Griffith University from 1993 to 2000.

He has examined for higher degrees at various universities in Australia, New Zealand, The Netherlands and South-East Asia. He has been visiting professor at two Indonesian Universities, and has been on the editorial boards or advisory boards of seven international theological journals (based in Australia, Scotland, Ireland, Switzerland, The Netherlands, The United Kingdom and Indonesia) and two international theological book series (based in Germany and The Netherlands). From 1990 to 1993 he was editor of Colloquium: The Australian and New Zealand Theological Review, and from 1992 to 1996 he was president of the Australian and New Zealand Society for Theological Studies (ANZSTS).

In 2009 he became a member of the Center of Theological Inquiry (CTI) at Princeton, USA, and in 2019 he became a McCord Fellow at the CTI. In 2011 he became an Honorary Fellow of Emmanuel College, University of Queensland, Australia. In 2012 he became extraordinary professor of theology at the University of Halmahera, Indonesia, where he had previously been visiting professor. Since 2012 he has been a member of the Board of International Evaluators for the Manfred Lautenschlaeger Award for Theological Promise (the successor to the John Templeton Award for Theological Promise) in the Wissenschaftlich-theologisches Seminar at the Ruprecht Karl University of Heidelberg, Germany, where he was also Scholar-in-Residence at the Forschungszentrum Internationale und Interdisziplinäre Theologie (FIIT). He is an elected Member of the International Academy of Practical Theology (IAPT), an elected Member of the International Association for Mission Studies (IAMS), and a Foundation Member of the International Reformed Theological Institute (IRTI). Since 2011 he has been a Centre Member of the Global Network of Research Centers for Theology, Religious and Christian Studies, later named the Global Network for Theology and Religion. He has also been a Visiting Scholar at Fuller Theological Seminary, Pasadena, USA; Princeton Theological Seminary, USA; and the University of Durham, UK.

He was co-chair of the National Dialogue between the Uniting Church in Australia and the Catholic Church in Australia from 1992 to 2004. He represented the Uniting Church at the Fifth World Conference on Faith and Order of the World Council of Churches at Santiago de Compostela, Spain in 1993, and was an official guest at the Ninth Assembly of the World Council of Churches meeting in Porto Alegre, Brazil, in 2006. In 2001 he became the first non-Anglican to preach at the Opening and Closing Eucharist Services, and to conduct the daily Bible Studies, at the General Synod of the Anglican Church of Australia. In 2008 he was head of the World Council of Churches’ Living Letters delegation visit to Indonesia. In 2009 and 2012 he was a member of the Australian delegations to the fifth and sixth governmental Regional Interfaith Dialogues in Perth, Australia and Semarang, Indonesia.

From 2002 to 2014 he was a member of the International Joint Commission for Dialogue between the World Methodist Council and the Roman Catholic Church (MERCIC). From 2004 to 2010 he was a member of the Network of Theologians of the World Alliance of Reformed Churches (WARC), and from 2009 to 2019 was a member of the editorial advisory board of Reformed World of the World Communion of Reformed Churches (WCRC). In 2010 he was one of twenty international scholars from the Anglican, Lutheran, Methodist and Reformed traditions invited to the Vatican to discuss the Harvesting the Fruits document (on forty years of dialogue between these communions and the Catholic Church) with the Roman Catholic Church.

He was a main speaker at the Maramon Convention in India in 2006. He was Niles Memorial Lecturer and Keynote Speaker at the Twelfth General Assembly of the Christian Conference of Asia in Chiang Mai, Thailand in 2005, and was a member of the executive and general committees of the Christian Conference of Asia from 2005 to 2010. He was Thomas Mar Athanasius Memorial Lecturer in India in 2004, and Ferguson Lecturer at the University of Auckland, New Zealand, in 2007. In 2013 he was appointed Lipman Fellow at St. Peter's College, Adelaide, and delivered the Lipman Fellow Lecture that year. He was the St. Andrew's College, University of Sydney annual lecturer in 2016. He was the Norman and Mary Miller Memorial Lecturer in Brisbane in 1989, the Canon Ivor Church Lecturer in Brisbane in 1995, the Archdeacon Glennie Memorial Lecturer in Toowoomba, Queensland in 1997, the Margaret McKinnon Memorial Lecturer in Melbourne in 1999, and the Commonwealth Attorney-General's Department Seminar Lecturer at the Asian Law Centre at the University of Melbourne in 2010.

Haire was also a member of the advisory board of the National Institute of Law, Ethics and Public Affairs (later the Key Centre for Ethics, Law, Justice and Governance), and was a member and chairperson of the Griffith Asia Pacific Council. From 2010 to 2011 he was a member of the panel appointed by the Government of Victoria to assess the application of the Melbourne College of Divinity (MCD) to become a specialist university. It subsequently became the University of Divinity. From 2001 to 2023 he was Patron of the Southern Queensland Theology Library (SQTL).

He was president-elect of the Uniting Church in Australia from 1997 to 2000, president of the Uniting Church in Australia from 2000 to 2003, and ex-president from 2003 to 2006. He was chairperson of the National Heads of Churches from 2000 to 2003. From 2005 to 2014 he served as minister-in-association of the Canberra Central Parish of the Uniting Church (Wesley and St. Aidan's Churches), and from 2015 to 2024 he was minister-in-association of St Paul's, Armitage, and (from 2022 to 2024) Calen Uniting Churches, Mackay, Queensland. From 1994 to 2006 he was Chairperson of the international mission committee of the Uniting Church in Australia.

From 2003 to 2013 he was executive director of the Australian Centre for Christianity and Culture within Charles Sturt University, of which he was also professor of theology from 2003 to 2015, and of which he has been emeritus professor of theology since 2015. In addition, until 2025 he continued as a research professor within the Australian Centre for Christianity and Culture, of which he was also a member of council from 2001 to 2013, and of which he became a centre ambassador in 2018. From 2005 to 2015 he was also director of the Research Centre for Public and Contextual Theology (PACT) within Charles Sturt University, of which he was also a Professorial Research Fellow, and which since 2022 has been incorporated into the Centre for Religion, Ethics and Society (CRES) within the Australian Centre for Christianity and Culture, Charles Sturt University. From 2008 to 2011 he was chair of the Global Network for Public Theology (GNPT).

Haire served as president of the National Council of Churches in Australia (NCCA) from 2003 to 2006.

He is a published book author (his work also translated into Dutch and Indonesian), and has had many academic articles and book chapters published internationally in English and Indonesian, with translations also into German, Indonesian and Korean.

Two Festschrift volumes of essays in his honour have been presented to him by international groups of scholars. In 2012 a Festschrift, entitled in English: Gospel and Cultures: Friends or Foes?, was presented to him to mark the fortieth anniversary of his ordination. In 2016 a second Festschrift, entitled in English: James Haire: Halmaheran from Beyond, was presented to him to mark his seventieth birthday.

He became a Presidential Friend of Indonesia in 2010. In 2012 the "James Haire Study Centre", a study and research centre, was opened in Halmahera, Indonesia, and named after him.

From 2014 to 2015 he was chairman of the advisory council of The Global Foundation, and in 2016 he became a patron of The Global Foundation. In 2014 he served as president of Christians for an Ethical Society in Canberra.

== Selected publications ==
- Haire, James (1981). The Character and Theological Struggle of the Church in Halmahera, Indonesia, 1941–1979 (Studien zur interkulturellen Geschichte des Christentums, Band 26). Frankfurt-am-Main und Bern: Verlag Peter D. Lang. ISBN 3820458883
- Haire, James (1982), "Indonesia", Chapter I.B.1, translations, Lukas Vischer, ed., Reformed Witness Today: A Collection of Confessions and Statements of Faith issued by Reformed Churches (Veroeffentlichung, Nr. 1). Bern: Evangelische Arbeitsstelle Oekumene Schweiz, 31–58
- Haire, James (1985), "Indigenous and Reformed", Reformed World 38.7, 374–384
- Haire, James (1987), "Animism: People and Spirit in Religious Life", Yeow Choo Lak, ed., Doing Theology with Religions of Asia. Singapore: ATESEA, 92–113
- Haire, James (1990), "Visions for the Church in the Great Southern Land" (The 1989 Norman and Mary Miller Memorial Lecture, Brisbane), Trinity Occasional Papers 9.1, 63–77
- Haire, James (1990), "Indonesia: The Island World of the Far East", J Thompson, ed., Into All the World: A History of the Overseas Work of the Presbyterian Church in Ireland, 1840–1990. Belfast: Overseas Board, Presbyterian Church in Ireland, 111–124
- Haire, James (1991), Chapter 8, World of Worship. Sydney: Australian Broadcasting Corporation Enterprises, 163–184
- Haire, James (1991), "Stories in Animism and Christian Pneumatology", John C England and Alan J Torrance, eds., Doing Theology with the Spirit's Movement in Asia. Singapore: ATESEA, 119–135, and Asia Journal of Theology 5.2, 397–409
- Haire, James (1992), "Culture and Interpretation", Irish Biblical Studies 14.2, 72–88
- Haire, James (1992), "Animism in Indonesia and Christian Pneumatology", J A B Jongeneel et al., eds., Pentecost, Mission and Ecumenism: Essays on Intercultural Theology: Festschrift in honour of Professor Walter J Hollenweger (Studien zur interkulturellen Geschichte des Christentums, Band 75). Frankfurt-am-Main und Bern: Verlag Peter Lang, 177–188
- Haire, James (1993), "Halmahera (Moluccas, Indonesia): People and Spirit", John C England and Archie C C Lee, eds., Doing Theology with Asian Resources: Ten Years in the Formation of Living Theology in Asia. Hong Kong/Auckland, New Zealand: PTCA/Pace, 199–229
- Haire, James (1997). Sifat dan Pergumulan Teologis Gereja di Halmahera 1941–1979, translated by Stephen Suleeman. Jakarta: BPK Gunung Mulia. ISBN 9794155225
- Haire, James (1998), "Animisme: Manusia dan Roh dalam Kehidupan Agama", Georg Kirchberger, SVD & John Mansford Prior, SVD, eds., Antara Bahtera Nuh dan Kapal Karam Paulus: Dialog Antaragama, Jilid II (Seri Verbum). Ende (Flores), Indonesia: Penerbit Nusa Indah, 17–49
- Haire, James (2003), with G Watson, "Authority and Integrity in the Ministry of the Church", Phronema 18, 29–53
- Haire, James (2005), "The Trends of the Ecumenical Movement in the Era of Globalisation", D Premen Niles, introduction, Windows into Ecumenism: Essays in Honour of Ahn Jae Woong. Hong Kong: Christian Conference of Asia, 61–69
- Haire, James (2005), "Halmahera: people and spirit in Religious Life", Chr G F de Jong, ed., Een vakkracht in het Koninkrijk: Kerk- en zendingshistorische opstellen (Festschrift in honour of Prof. Dr. Thomas van den End). Heerenveen, The Netherlands: Groen, 82–103
- Haire, James (2006), "Asian Realities and the Ecumenical Response", C T C Bulletin: Bulletin of the Program Area on Faith, Mission and Unity (Theological Concerns), Christian Conference of Asia 22.3, 1–10
- Haire, James (2007), Christine Ledger and Stephen Pickard, eds., From Resurrection to Return: Perspectives from Theology and Science on Christian Eschatology (PACT Series 3). Adelaide: ATF Press
- Haire, James (2007), "Public Theology - a Latin Captivity of the Church: Violence and Public Theology in the Asia-Pacific Context", International Journal of Public Theology 1.3 & 4, 455–470
- Haire, James (2007), "Public Theology - a Purely Western Issue? Public Theology in the Praxis of the Church in Asia", C T C Bulletin: Bulletin of the Program Area on Faith, Mission and Unity (Theological Concerns), Christian Conference of Asia 23.3, 48–61
- Haire, James (2008), "Injil, HAM dan Kebudayaan Halmahera", Ruddy Tindage and Riang M P Hutabarat, eds., Gereja dan Penegakan HAM. Yogyakarta, Indonesia: Kanisius, 217–240
- Haire, James (2009), "Confessional Theological Struggles in the Uniting Church, 1997-2003", Uniting Church Studies 15.1, 1–19
- Haire, James (2010), "Sentralitas Teologi Kontekstual bagi Keberadaan Kristen Dewasa Ini", Jurnal Ledalero: Wacana Iman dan Kebudayaan (Discourse on Faith and Culture) 9.2, 176-199
- Haire, James (2011), "The Search for Communities of Peace: An International Reflection on Christian - Muslim Relations", Luca Anceschi, Joseph Anthony Camilleri, Ruwan Palapathwala, and Andrew Wicking, eds., Religion and Ethics in a Globalizing World: Conflict, Dialogue and Transformation. New York, NY, USA: Palgrave Macmillan, 175–190
- Haire, James (2011), Education and Transformation (Emmanuel College Paper, Number 15). Brisbane: Emmanuel College, University of Queensland
- Haire, James (2012), "Towards a Theological Understanding of Peace in the Ecumenical Context of Asian Christianity", Prakesh K. George, ed., Swords into Ploughshares: Towards a Culture of Peace and Justice: Festschrift in honour of Rt. Rev. Dr. Isaac Mar Philoxenos. Delhi, India: ISPCK, 41–57
- Haire, James (2013), "Public Theology: Reflection on the Future of the Discourse", Jesper Svartvik and Jakob Wirén, eds., Religious Stereotyping and Interreligious Relations. New York, NY, USA: Palgrave Macmillan, 21–32
- Haire, James (2013), "Christology in Context in Reformed Theology: Opportunities and Limitations", Reformed World 63.2, 2–16
- Haire, James (2013), "My Journey in Mission", Australian Journal of Mission Studies 7.1, 3–6
- Haire, James (2013), "Dinamika Teologi Pergumulan Rangkap", Richard A. D. Siwu, Karolina Augustien Kaunang and Denni H. R. Pinontoan, eds., Melayani Gereja dan Masyarakat Secara Utuh: Buku Penghormatan 80 tahun Pdt. Prof. Dr. Wilhelmus Absalom Roeroe (Festschrift in honour of Prof. Dr. W A Roeroe). Tomohon, Indonesia: UKIT Press, 206–213
- Haire, James (2014), "Teologi Kontekstual dan Hendrik van Dijken di Halmahera", Karolina Augustien Kaunang, ed., Ziarah Dalam Misi: Buku Penghormatan 75 Tahun Pdt. Prof. Dr. Jan Arie Bastiaan Jongeneel. SH (Festschrift in honour of Prof Dr J A B Jongeneel), Tomohon, Indonesia: UKIT Press, 284–290
- Haire, James (2015), "Őffentliche Theologie - ein rein westliche Angelegenheit? Őffentliche Theologie in der Praxis der Kirche in Asien", Florian Höhne und Frederike van Oorschot, eds., Grundtexte Őffentliche Theologie. Leipzig: Evangelische Verlagsanstalt, 153–171
- Haire, James (2015), "Contextual Theology and Religious Discourse in Indonesia", Douglas J Davies and Adam J Powell, eds., Sacred Selves, Sacred Settings: Reflecting Hans Mol (Festschrift in honour of Hans Mol). Farnham, U. K. and Burlington, VT, U. S. A.: Ashgate, 145–163
- Haire, James (2015), "Australian Methodist Ecumenism", Aldersgate Papers: Theological Journal of the Australasian Centre for Wesleyan Research 11, 77–93
- Haire, James (2015), "Christology in the Context of Indonesia: Opportunities and Limitations", Mission Studies: Journal of the International Association for Mission Studies 32.3, 398–417
- Haire, James (2017), "United and Uniting Churches", Paul McPartlan and Geoffrey Wainwright, eds., The Oxford Handbook of Ecumenical Studies. Oxford: Oxford University Press Oxford Handbooks Online
- Haire, James (2017), "Can Christianity and Islam live in peace? - A Christian Perspective", Karolina Augustien Kaunang and Denni H.R. Pinontoan, eds., Teologi Perjumpaan: Pengalaman, Gagasan dan Refleksi (Buku Penghormatan HUT ke-78 Prof Olaf H. Schumann dan Penghargaan atas Pengabdiannya untuk Fakultas Teologi dan PPsT UKIT/Festschrift in honour of Prof. Dr. Olaf Schumann). Tomohon, Indonesia: UKIT Press, 67–84
- Haire, James (2018), "Evolution of Christian Beliefs in Asia" and "Politics and Christianity in Asia", Mark A Lamport, ed., Encyclopedia of Christianity in the Global South. Lanham, MD, USA: Rowman and Littlefield Publishers, 276–277; 646
- Haire, James (2019), "Halmahera dan Pentingnya Teologi Kontekstual", translated by Liliane Mojau, Liliane Mojau, Jerizal Petrus dan Sirayandris J Botara, eds., Bertumbuh Bersama dalam Arus Zaman yang Terus Berubah: Bunga Rampai 70 Tahun Gereja Masehi Injili di Halmahera (GMIH). Jakarta: BPK Gunung Mulia, 229-240
- Haire, James (2020), "The Uniting Church and Christian Unity", Robert W. Renton, ed., Finding a Home in the Uniting Church. Melbourne: Uniting Church National History Society, 187-199
- Haire, James (2021), "United and Uniting Churches", Geoffrey Wainwright and Paul McPartlan, eds., The Oxford Handbook of Ecumenical Studies. Oxford: Oxford University Press, 432-440.

== Family ==
He is one of five children. His father was the Reverend Professor James Loughridge Mitchell 'Jimmie' Haire (1909–85), who served as Professor of Systematic Theology and Apologetics in Assembly's College, Belfast from 1944 until 1976, principal of the college from 1961 until 1976 and Moderator of the Presbyterian Church in Ireland in 1970. He was also Karl Barth’s English academic translator, particularly in the delivery of his Gifford Lectures, in 1937–1938. His mother was Dr. Margaret Haire née Mitchell FRCPath. His paternal grandparents were the Reverend Professor James Haire (1874–1959), who served as Professor of Systematic Theology in Assembly's College, Belfast from 1919 until 1944 and Moderator of the Presbyterian Church in Ireland in 1939, and Dr. Charlotte Eleanor 'Lottie' Haire née Mitchell. His paternal grandfather's second cousin was the Reverend Professor Samuel Angus (1881–1943). His maternal grandfather, the Reverend Dr William Mitchell, was related to Dame Helen Porter Mitchell GBE, popularly known as Dame Nellie Melba (1861–1931). He is married, with children and grandchildren.

== Honours ==
He became a Knight of the Order of St John (Sovereign Order of St John of Jerusalem, Knights Hospitaller) (KSJ) in 2000, and a Knight Grand Cross of Honour of the Order of St John (GCHSJ) in 2014. He became a Rotary Honorary Peace Ambassador in 2001. He was awarded an Australian Centenary Medal in 2001, and was appointed a Member of the Order of Australia (AM) in 2006. He was appointed a Companion of the Order of Australia (AC), Australia's highest civilian honour, in 2013, "For eminent service to the community through international leadership in ecumenical and interfaith dialogue, the promotion of religious reconciliation, inclusion and peace, and as a theologian."

Religious titles
Preceded by John Mavor	President of the Assembly, Uniting Church in Australia; July 2000-July 2003	Succeeded by Dean Drayton
