= Stuart McMillan (church leader) =

Uniting Church in Australia leader

President of the Assembly, Uniting Church in Australia
- In office 2015–2018
- Preceded by: Andrew Dutney
- Succeeded by: Deidre Palmer

Moderator, Northern Synod UCA
- In office 2010–2015

Personal details
- Born: 1955 (age 70–71)
- Spouse: Ros McMillan
- Occupation: Accountant, general manager, church leader

Stuart McMillan (born 1955) was the national President of the Uniting Church in Australia (UCA) from July 2015 to July 2018. He was installed for a three-year term on 12 July 2015 at a service at Perth's Scotch College.

== Uniting Church in Australia ==
In 1982, McMillan was interviewed for and appointed to a position as an accountant with the UCA's Northern Synod, based in Darwin, Northern Territory. He and his wife Ros moved from Epping in Sydney with their young family.

McMillan has had many roles in the Northern Synod and associated organisations: accountant, operations manager, general manager of the Arnhem Land Progress Association (ALPA) - now the Arnhem Land Progress Aboriginal Corporation, pastor, cultural awareness trainer, resource worker, community developer, and Moderator.

After living and working in the Northern Territory for some time, a man McMillan knew adopted him as his brother in the Gupapuyngu clan of the Yolngu nation with the skin name bulany meaning red kangaroo. In order that Yolngu kinship ties were proper in terms of Stuart and Ros' relationship, and to complete the induction, the man's wife also adopted Ros McMillan as her sister.

McMillan worked as an advisor to the former Moderator of the Uniting Church in Australia's Northern Synod, the Rev. Djiniyini Gondarra, for 12 years through the period after the High Court’s Mabo case decision established native title. McMillan was involved in researching the claimants' situations, and making trips to Canberra to assist Gondarra and others as they gave their input on the drafting of the Native Title Act under the Prime Minister of Australia, Paul Keating.

The McMillans became part of the Humpty Doo semi-rural community near Darwin, and its Uniting Church. After several ministers, McMillan took on the role of pastor, presiding over weddings, funerals and other activities of an ordained minister.

=== Moderator, Northern Synod ===
McMillan's wife, Ros McMillan, served as Moderator of the Northern Synod, based in Darwin, from 1996 to 1999.

McMillan served as moderator for five years until June 2015.

=== President of the Assembly ===
McMillan was elected as President-Elect at the 13th Assembly, held in Adelaide, South Australia in July 2012.

McMillan was installed as the President of the UCA on Sunday 12 July 2015, at the 14th Triennial Assembly held in Perth, Western Australia (12–18 July 2015). He replaced the Rev. Andrew Dutney.

He started his address to the installation service with the words, in the Yolŋu language, "Bala limurr roŋyirr ŋorraŋgitjlil" – "Let us return to the white ashes of the fire", an allusion to the Holy Spirit.

As a lay president, McMillan's role in worship will be slightly circumscribed. Under Uniting Church regulations he will not be able to officiate at baptisms or preside over communion outside his synod without the authorisation of the host presbytery.

Religious titles
Preceded by Rev. Prof. Andrew Dutney	President of the Assembly, Uniting Church in Australia; July 2015 - July 2018	Succeeded by Dr Deidre Palmer
