= Alistair Macrae =

21st-century Australian Christian minister

The Reverend Alistair Macrae AO
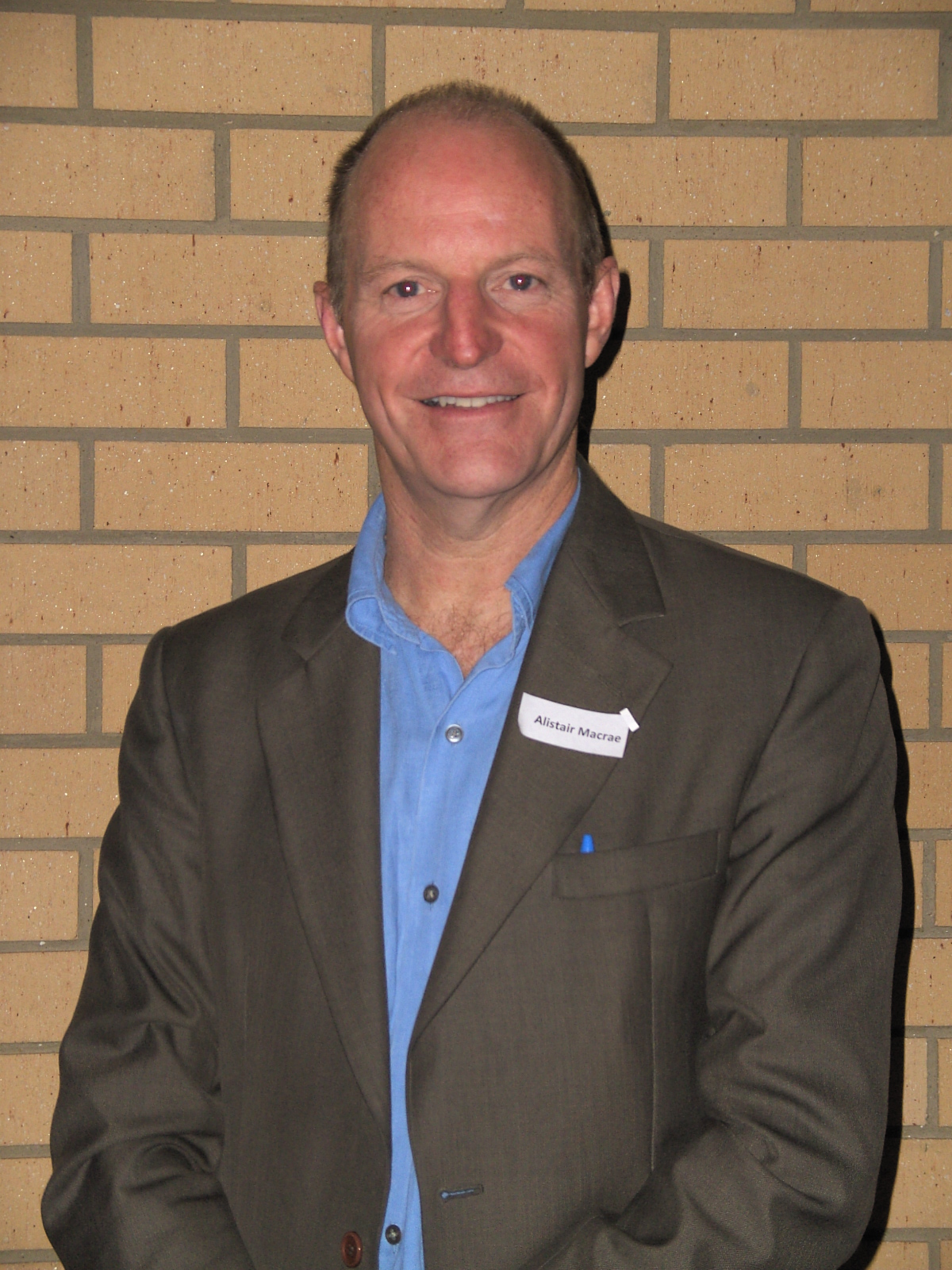
- The Revd Alistair Macrae, May 2010
- President of the Assembly
- Church: Uniting Church in Australia
- Installed: 2009
- Term ended: 2012
- Predecessor: Gregor Henderson
- Successor: Andrew Dutney
- Moderator of Synod of Victoria and Tasmania
- Church: Uniting Church in Australia
- Installed: 2000
- Term ended: 2003

Orders
- Ordination: 1984

Personal details
- Born: Alistair James Macrae; 1957 (age 68–69)
- Parents: Revd Donald and Anne Macrae
- Spouse: Clare Boyd-Macrae
- Children: Four

Alistair Macrae AO (born 1957) is an ordained Christian minister of the Uniting Church in Australia and was formerly a moderator of the Synod of Victoria and Tasmania, and President of the National Assembly.

== Early life and education ==
Macrae is the son of the Reverend Donald and Anne Macrae. He was born in Melbourne and spent most of his childhood in Sale, Victoria, before moving to Melbourne for secondary education and university. Macrae has degrees in arts, theology and philosophy from the University of Melbourne and the Trinity College Dublin.

== Ordained service ==
Macrae was ordained in 1984 and has served in congregations at Mt Beauty, Portland and West Brunswick in Victoria. He served as Moderator of the Synod of Victoria and Tasmania (2000–2003) and as executive director of the Uniting Church Centre for Theology and Ministry (2004–2009) in that Synod. He was a member of the board of Wesley Mission Melbourne and chaired its social policy committee. He has been a Director on the Board of Uniting Vic.Tas since 2020.

Macrae was an inaugural member of the Victorian State Government's Community Support Fund and served on the advisory committee of the Community Alcohol Action network of the Australian Drug Foundation.

=== President of the UCA ===
Macrae became President of the UCA in July 2009, at the 12th Assembly. His theme for the three years of the Assembly was "Living Water, Thirsty Land".

In September 2013 Macrae commenced as Minister of Wesley Uniting Church, Lonsdale Street, Melbourne. On 12 February 2023, Macrae retired from formal ministry, in a service at Wesley.

== Personal life ==
Macrae is married to Clare Boyd-Macrae, a writer, and they have four children, Tess, Patrick, Hamish and Fiona. His interests include sport, notably Australian Rules football (he played nearly 300 games of Victorian Amateur and country football) as well as cooking, reading, running, renovating, gardening and being with family and friends.

Macrae was appointed an Officer of the Order of Australia in the 2017 Australia Day Honours for distinguished service to the Uniting Church in Australia through executive and ministerial roles at state and national levels, and to the promotion of ecumenism, interfaith dialogue and reconciliation. In 2021, he (along with several others) handed back his award as a response to Margaret Court being elevated from Officer to Companion of the Order of Australia.

Religious titles
Preceded by Gregor Henderson	President of the Assembly, Uniting Church in Australia; July 2009 - July 2012	Succeeded by Andrew Dutney
