= Uniting Church in Australia, Synod of Victoria and Tasmania =

The Synod of Victoria and Tasmania is the entity of the Uniting Church in Australia covering the states of Victoria and Tasmania. It is one of six geographically-based synods of the church. When the Uniting Church was created in 1977, the Synod of Victoria and Synod of Tasmania were independent, but subsequently merged on 22 June 2002.

The leader of the synod is the moderator elected to the position for a period of three years. Rev Salesi Faupula became Moderator of the Synod of Victoria and Tasmania on 30 August 2025.

== Presbyteries ==
The Synod of Victoria and Tasmania comprises eight presbyteries (regional councils):

- Presbytery of Gippsland
- Presbytery of Loddon Mallee
- Presbytery of North East Victoria
- Presbytery of Port Phillip East
- Presbytery of Port Phillip West
- Presbytery of Tasmania
- Presbytery of Western Victoria
- Presbytery of Yarra Yarra

When the Uniting Church in Australia was created in 1977, there were 17 presbyteries: three in the Synod of Tasmania and fourteen in the Synod of Victoria.

== Moderators ==
=== Victoria and Tasmania ===
| Date | Name |
|---|---|
| 2025–2029 | Rev Salesi Faupula |
| 2022–2025 | David Fotheringham |
| 2019–2022 | Rev Denise Liersch |
| 2016–2019 | Rev Sharon Hollis |
| 2013-2016 | Mr Dan Wootton |
| 2009-2013 | Ms Isabel Thomas Dobson |
| 2006–2009 | Rev Jason Kioa |
| 2003-2006 | Rev Sue Gormann |
| 2000–2003 | Rev Alistair Macrae |

=== Victoria ===
| Date | Name |
|---|---|
| 1997-2000 | Rev Pam Kerr |
| 1994-1997 | Rev Warren Bartlett |
| 1992-93 | Mrs Nancy Bomford |
| 1991-92 | Rev John Billington |
| 1990-91 | Rev Kerrie Graham |
| 1989-90 | Rev Rod Horsfield |
| 1988-89 | Rev David Uren |
| 1987-1988 | Rev Hamish Christie Johnson |
| 1986-87 | Rev Allan Thompson |
| 1985-86 | Rev Alex Kilgour |
| 1984 | Rev Dr Stewart Murray |
| 1983 | Mr Charles Lavender |
| 1982 | Rev Dr Alan Crawford] |
| 1981 | Rev Laurie Turner |
| 1980 | Rev Ian Smith |
| 1979 | Rev Jock Lavender |
| 1978 | Mrs Ethel Mitchell |
| 1977 | Rev Ronald Allardice |

=== Tasmania ===
| Date | Name |
|---|---|
| 2001–2002 | Rev Colleen Grieve |
| 1999-2001 | Rev Rob Brown |
| 1997-1999 | Mrs Isabel Thomas-Dobson |
| 1995-1997 | Mr Don Hall |
| 1993-1995 | Rev Peter Cotterell |
| 1991-1993 | Dr Peter Gunn |
| 1989-1991 | Rev John Pettman |
| 1987-1989 | Rev Brian Giddings |
| 1986-1987 | Rev Ron Upson |
| 1985-1986 | Rev John Minchin |
| 1984-1985 | Dr Jill Tabart |
| 1983-1984 | Rev Rob Kirwood |
| 1982-1983 | Rev Thomas Griffiths |
| 1981–1982 | Rev Robert Hazeldine |
| 1980–1981 | Rev Max Stansall |
| 1979–1980 | Mr Neville Marsh |
| 1977–1979 | Rev Christiaan Mostert |
