= Gregor Henderson =

Australian minister

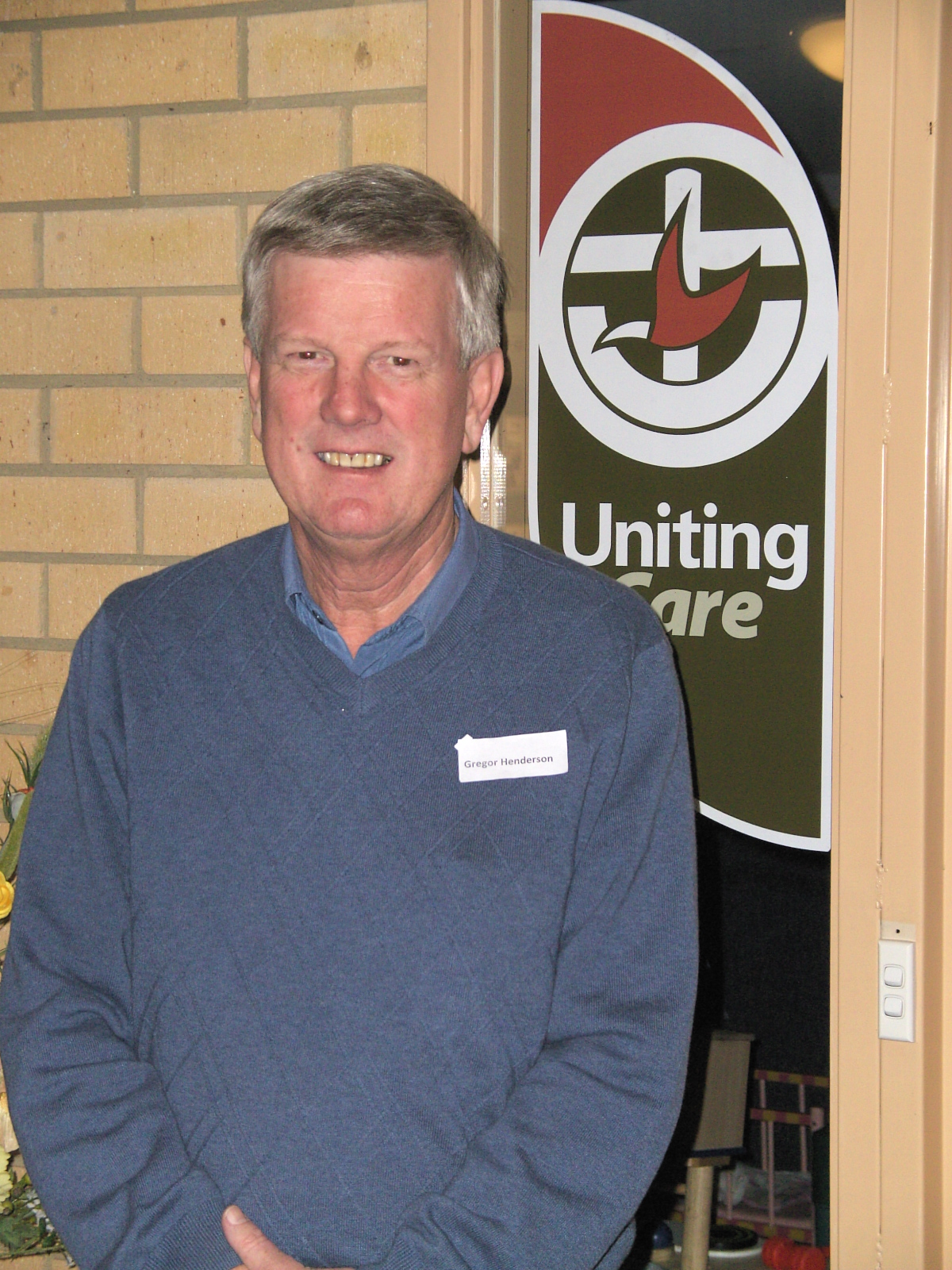
Rev. Gregor Henderson, May 2010

Rev. Gregor Sutherland Henderson AM is an ordained Christian minister of the Uniting Church in Australia. For 12 years he was the General Secretary of the UCA's National Assembly and was the President of the National Assembly for three years 2006–2009.

== Ordained service ==
Henderson was ordained in 1971 and served in the parishes of Shepparton North (1971–1975), Wodonga (1975–1982) and Hobart City (1983–1988). He then served for 12 years as General Secretary of the UCA's National Assembly, from January 1989 to December 2000. During 2001–2003 he was executive director of the Clergy Exchange International Foundation. In February 2004, Henderson then became minister at Wesley Uniting Church, in Forrest, Australian Capital Territory, in inner suburban Canberra.

=== National Assembly of the Uniting Church in Australia ===
Henderson was the General Secretary of the Assembly for 12 years from 1989 to 2000.

For the three years from July 2006 to July 2009 Henderson served as national President of the Uniting Church in Australia, while remaining also part-time at Wesley before returning to full-time ministry in July 2009. During his presidency, he traveled extensively, nationally and internationally.

=== Ecumenical and organisational involvement ===
Henderson was a member of the World Council of Churches Central Committee from 1998 until 2013, served on committees and assemblies of the Christian Conference of Asia, has been heavily involved in the National Council of Churches in Australia (NCCA) since its establishment in 1994, and has visited many of the Uniting Church's overseas partner churches in Asia and the Pacific.

Henderson has ongoing involvement with Frontier Services, the Uniting Church's outback ministry agency, of which he was chairperson for several years; and with Act for Peace, the international aid agency of the NCCA. He is currently chair of the Board of the John Flynn Foundation.

== Personal life ==
Henderson's wife, Alison, died after a short illness in 2007. They have three daughters.

== Political life ==
Henderson is currently involved with the Boycott, Divestment and Sanctions (BDS) movement. His activities include approaching local businesses and requesting them to stop selling Israeli-made goods.

== Honours ==
At the 2015 Australia Day Honours, Henderson was appointed a Member of the Order of Australia for significant service to the community through executive and ministerial roles in the Uniting Church in Australia, and through interfaith initiatives.

== Publications ==
Henderson has published various works, including:

- Jesus, man at the centre (1976)
- Divine detection, discovering God's will (1988)

Religious titles
| Preceded by Dean Drayton | President of the Assembly, Uniting Church in Australia; July 2006 – July 2009 | Succeeded by Alistair Macrae |
