= Uniting College for Leadership and Theology =

- Established: 1968 as Parkin-Wesley College
- Religious affiliation: Uniting Church in Australia
- Principal: Reverend Dr. Vicki Balabanski
- Location: Adelaide, South Australia, Australia; 34°55′50″S 138°32′54″E
- Campus: Brooklyn Park
- Website: unitingcollege.edu.au

The Uniting College for Leadership and Theology located at Brooklyn Park South Australia is a Uniting Church in Australia (UCA) theological college for the education and training of both lay people and those for specified ministries including the diaconate and youth workers. It is a member college of the University of Divinity.

The College had its origin in Parkin Congregational College, in what was previously "Wavertree", the 64 North Terrace, Kent Town, residence of Frederick Holder, but owned by the widow of William Roby Fletcher. Rev. Dr Llewelyn D. Bevan, LLD, was in February 1910 its founding principal, a position he held until his death in 1918, and was succeeded by Rev. Edward S. Kiek, M.A., B.D., who retired in 1957 and died in 1959.

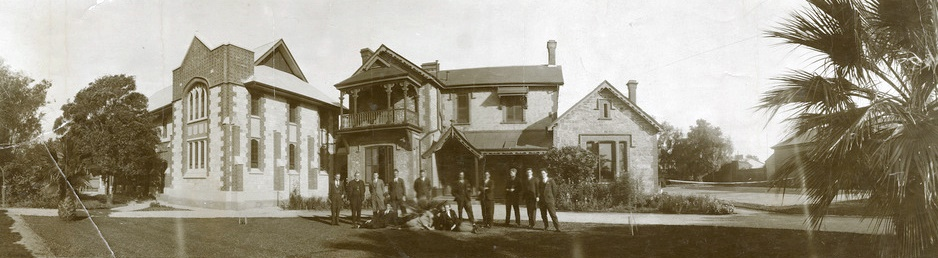
Parkin Theological College 1920

In 1920 representatives from Adelaide's Congregational, Baptist, and Presbyterian churches agreed to establish Parkin as a united theological college for the training of ministers. From 1930, staff of the Congregational Union of Australia's Parkin College and the Methodist Church of Australasia's Wesley Theological College lectured students of both institutions. In the 1950s, the Baptist College was founded in Northgate Street, Unley Park and further sharing of staff occurred, although more limited than between Parkin and Wesley. In 1968, Parkin College and Wesley Theological College merged to form Parkin-Wesley College at Wayville, the site of Wesley College.

Later, the South Australian UCA Lay Education Centre was merged in.

Coolamon College was the national UCA agency and provider of distance theological education. In 2003, Coolamon College moved from Brisbane to Adelaide, where it joined the Adelaide College of Divinity.

Parkin-Wesley College was renamed Uniting College for Leadership and Theology in January 2009, at this time it took on the distance learning function previously offered through Coolamon College.

Until the end of 2021 it contributed to theological education at The Flinders University of South Australia. It was a constituent college of the Adelaide College of Divinity up to the end of 2022.

== People ==
- Reverend Dr. Andrew Dutney was Principal
- Reverend Dr. Ian B. Tanner was Director of Lay Education
- Reverend Dr. H. D'Arcy Wood was a lecturer at the college
