= Uniting Church in Australia =

Australian Christian denomination

- UCA logo
- Type: United church
- Classification: Mainline Protestant
- Orientation: Methodist and Reformed
- Scripture: Protestant Bible
- Polity: mixed Presbyterian, Connexional and Congregational
- President of the Assembly: Charissa Suli
- Distinct fellowships: Uniting Aboriginal and Islander Christian Congress
- Associations: NCCA, WCC, CCA, WCRC, World Methodist Council, Pacific Conference of Churches
- Region: Australia
- Origin: 1977; 49 years ago
- Merger of: Methodist Church of Australasia; Congregational Union of Australia; Much of the Presbyterian Church of Australia
- Congregations: 2,000
- Members: 243,000 (2016)
- Aid organization: UnitingCare UnitingWorld
- Nursing homes: UnitingCare

The Uniting Church in Australia (UCA) is a united church in Australia. It is affiliated with the World Communion of Reformed Churches and the World Methodist Council.

== History ==
The church was founded on 22 June 1977 when most congregations of the Methodist Church of Australasia, about two-thirds of the Presbyterian Church of Australia and almost all the churches of the Congregational Union of Australia united under the UCA's Basis of Union. According to the church, it had 243,000 members in 2018. In the 2021 census, 673,260 Australians identified with the UCA, down from 1,065,796 in the 2011 census. The UCA is Australia's third-largest Christian denomination, behind the Catholic and Anglican churches. There are around 2,000 UCA congregations, and 2001 National Church Life Survey (NCLS) research indicated that average weekly attendance was about 10 per cent of census figures.

Uniting Church members as a percentage of the total population in the 2011 census, divided geographically by local area

== Organisation ==
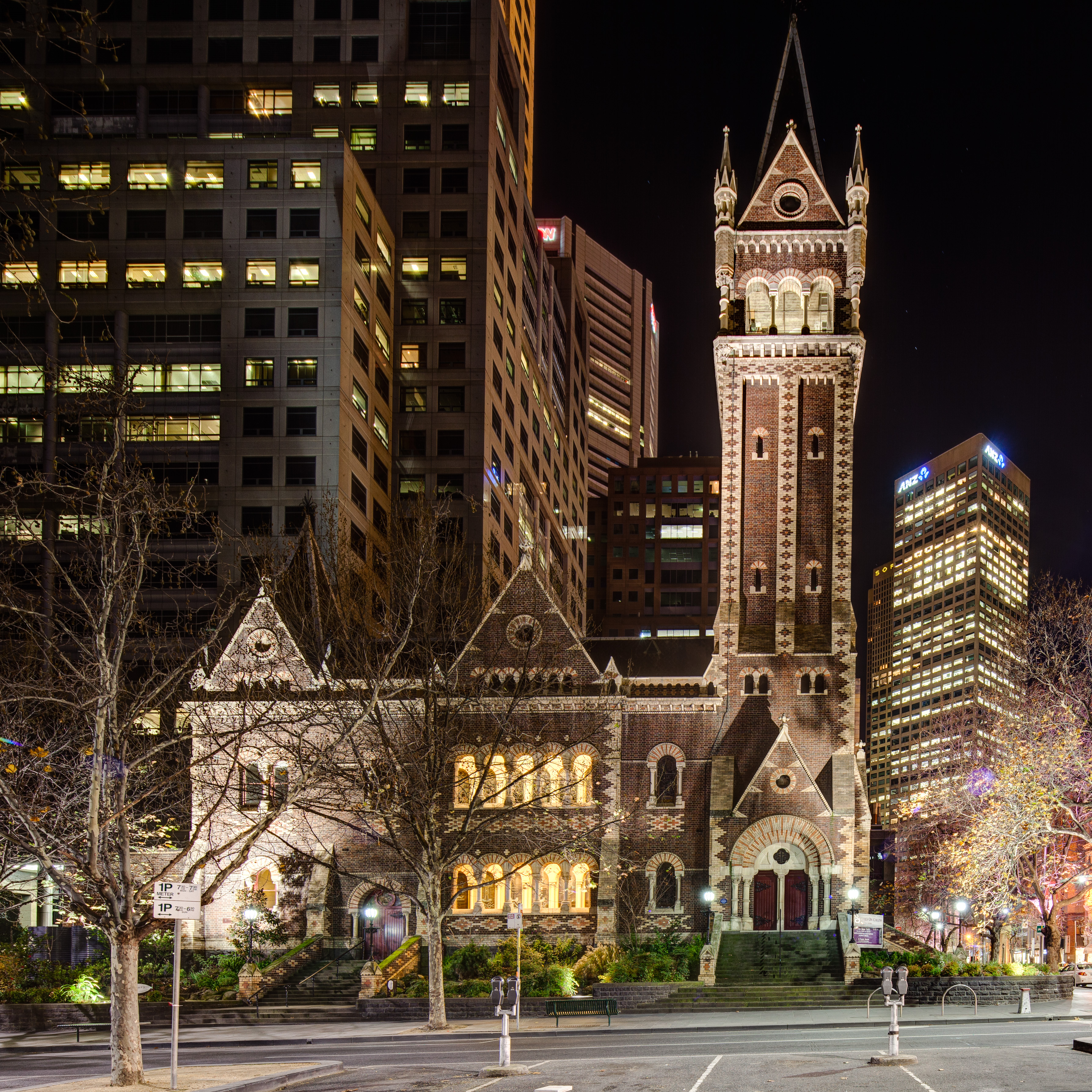
St Michael's Uniting Church, Melbourne (pictured) was formerly the Congregational Union Australia Church.

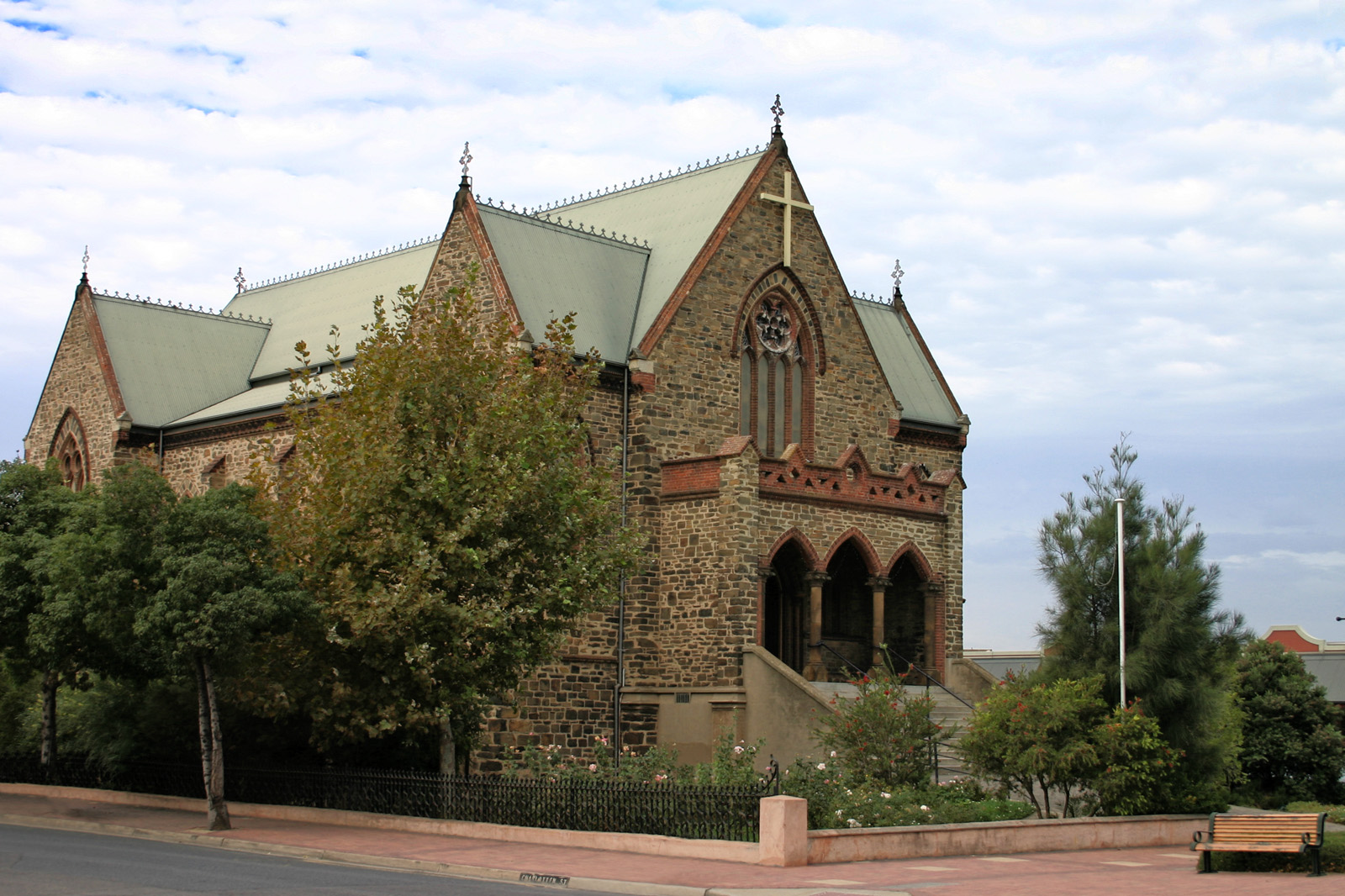
Port Adelaide Uniting Church

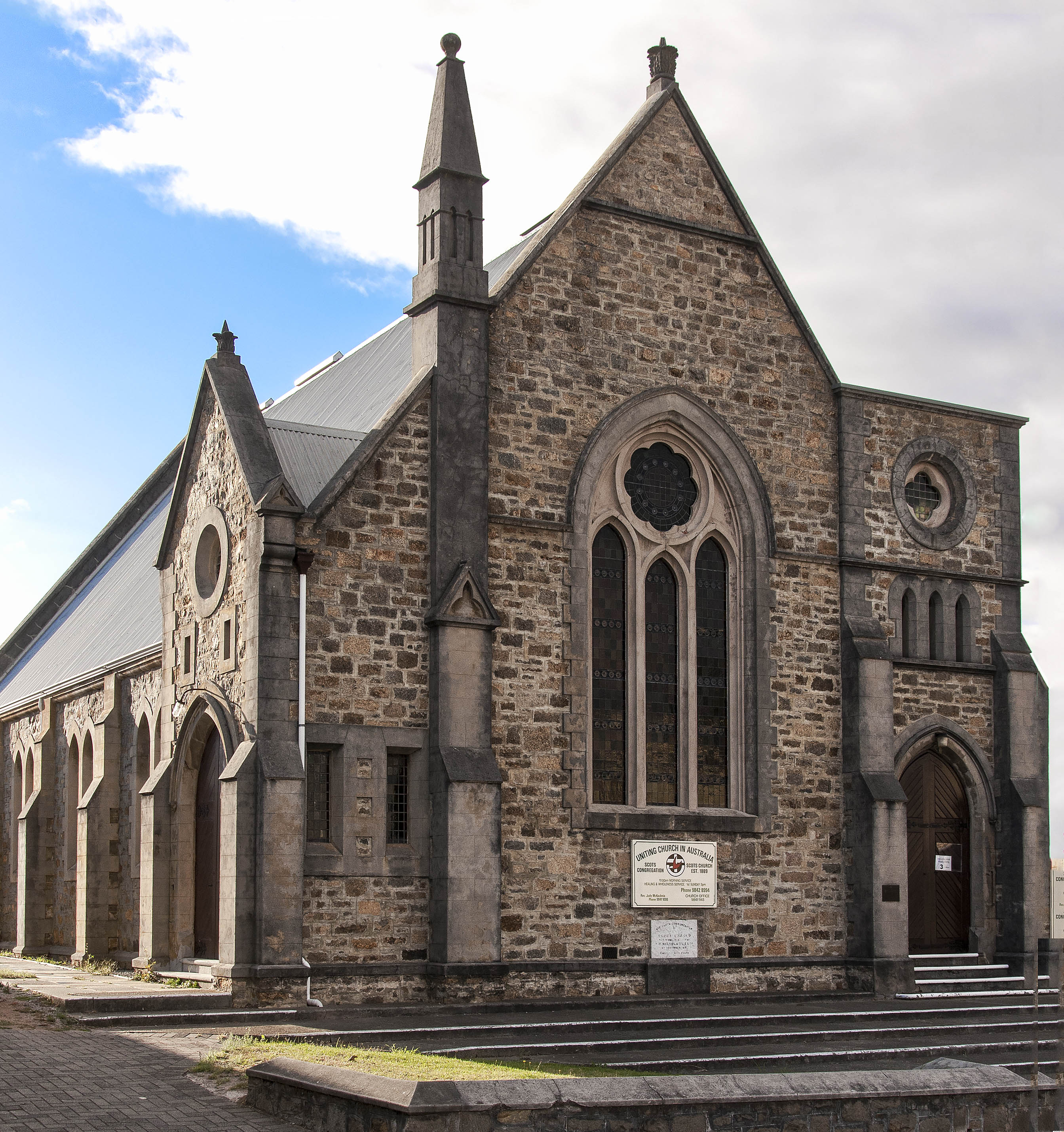
Scots Uniting Church in Albany, Western Australia

The UCA is a national, unincorporated association of councils, each of which has responsibility for functions in the church. The councils are congregations (local), presbyteries (regional), synods (state) and an assembly (national).

=== Assembly ===
The UCA assembly meets every three years.

=== President ===
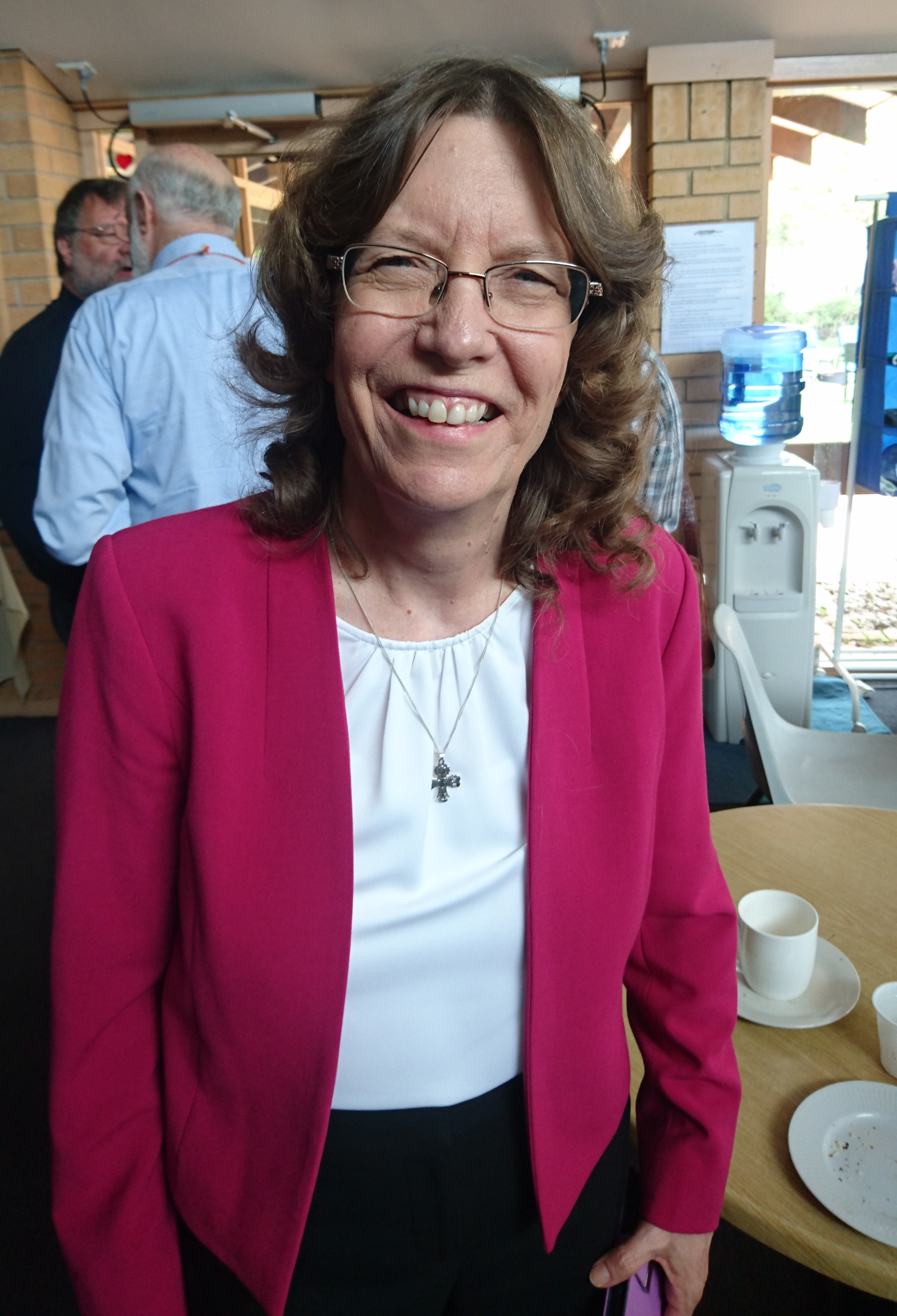
Deidre Palmer was UCA President from 2018 to 2021.

The current president is Reverend Charissa Suli since she was installed as president in the meeting of the 17th Assembly on 11 July 2024. She replaced Reverend Sharon Hollis, who had succeeded Dr Deidre Palmer at the start of the 16th Assembly in July 2021. Palmer was the second woman in the role, following Jill Tabart (1994-1997). Palmer was the moderator of the Presbytery and Synod of South Australia from November 2013 to November 2016. Hollis was moderator of the Synod of Victoria and Tasmania at the time of her election in 2018 as the president-elect and became president at the beginning of the sixteenth assembly, which was to be held in Queensland in 2021. As a result of the COVID-19 pandemic, the meeting was moved to a shorter, online form.

=== Synods ===
Synods are UCA councils which roughly correspond to state boundaries. Each synod meets about once per year, with a standing committee to represent it between sessions. Synod responsibilities include the promotion and encouragement of the church's mission, theological and ministerial education, and overseeing property matters. There are six synods:

- Synod of New South Wales and the ACT (formerly the NSW Synod)
- Synod of Queensland
- Synod of South Australia
- Synod of Western Australia
- Synod of Victoria and Tasmania
- The Northern Synod, which includes the Northern Territory, north-west Western Australia and northern South Australia.

=== Congregations ===
There are about 2,000 UCA congregations, with 243,000 members and adherents. Congregations range in size from a dozen to hundreds of members.

== Agencies ==
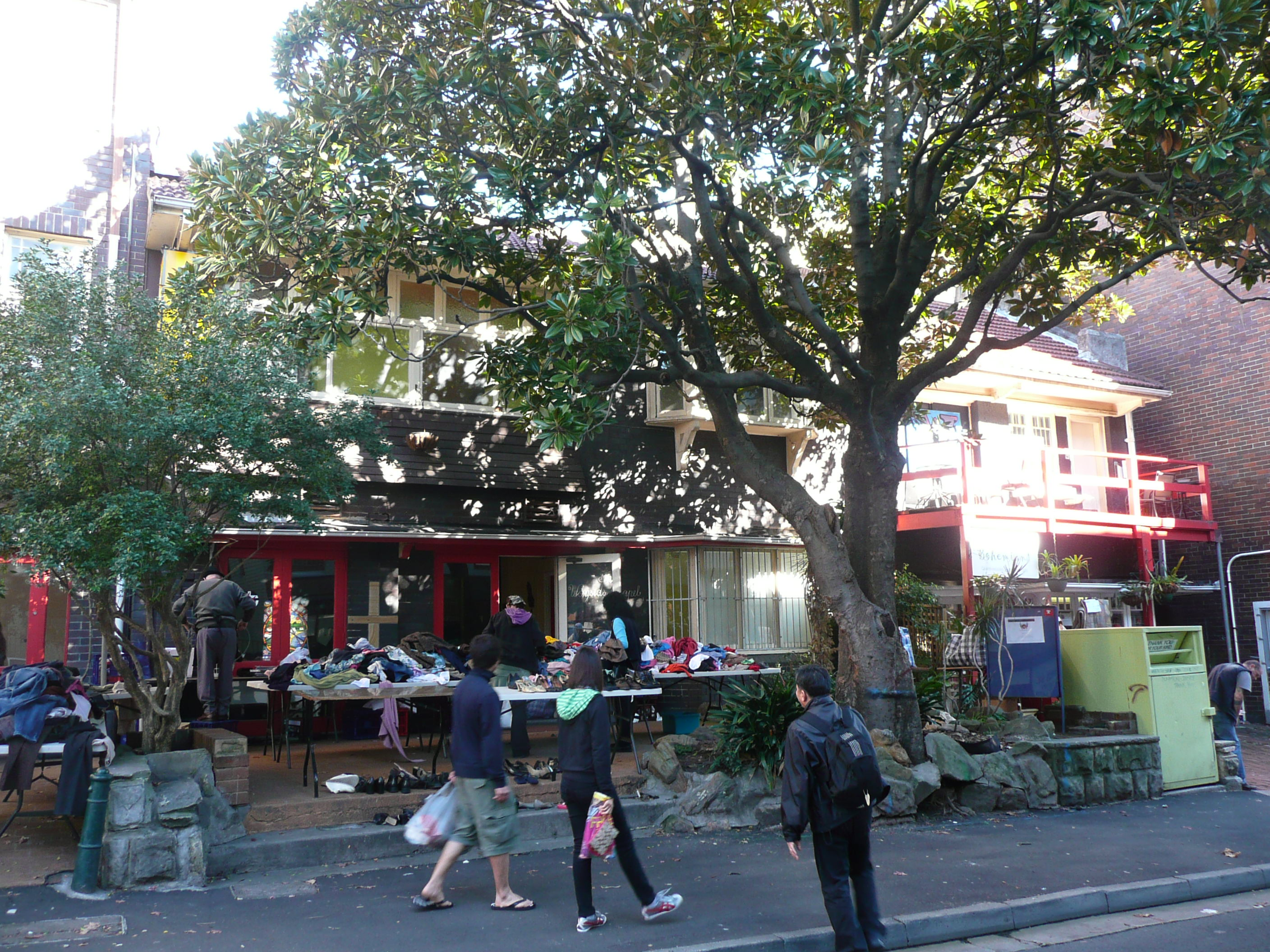
Wayside Chapel, Potts Point

=== UnitingCare Australia ===
UnitingCare Australia, operates shelters and emergency housing; family-relationships support; disability services, and food kitchens.

=== International aid ===
UnitingWorld is the church's international-aid agency. It receives funding from the government of Australia to implement development and poverty-alleviation programs in the Pacific, Asia and Africa. UnitingWorld works in partnership with 18 overseas denominations to support over 180,000 people annually through sustainable community development projects.

== National Christian Youth Convention ==
The National Christian Youth Convention is a national UCA activity during school and university holidays, every two or three years in a different city. NCYC 2007, "Agents of Change", was held in Perth. The 2009 "Converge" was held in Melbourne. NCYC 2011 was held from 29 December 2010 to 4 January 2011 at the Southport School on Queensland's Gold Coast. Yuróra NCYC 2014 was held in North Parramatta, Sydney from 7 to 10 January 2014. Yuróra NCYC 2017, "Uniting Culture", was also held in Sydney in January 2017.

== Culture ==
The UCA advocates for social justice. It has taken stances on issues such as native title for indigenous people; the environment; apartheid; refugee status, and safe injection facilities for drug users. The church is similar to other united and uniting churches, which maintain a cultural identity in their own country and practise ecumenical fellowship with other Christian denominations worldwide. Between 1991 and 2013, UCA attendance declined by 41 per cent. In 2013, about 97,200 people attended weekly worship services throughout Australia.

== Beliefs ==
=== LGBTQ inclusion ===
In 1994, progressive churches founded the Uniting Network Australia for the inclusion of LGBTQ people.

The church permits local presbyteries to ordain gay and lesbian ministers.

The fairly broad consensus has been that a person's sexual orientation should not be a bar to attendance, membership or participation in the church. More controversial has been the issue of sexual activity by gay and lesbian people and the sexual behaviour of ordination candidates. In 2003, the church voted to allow local presbyteries to decide whether to ordain gay and lesbian people as ministers.

In March 2021, the UCA became the first mainstream Australian church to induct a transgender minister, when Jo Inkpin was installed at Pitt Street Uniting Church in Sydney.

=== Marriage ===
Ministers were permitted to bless same-sex couples entering civil unions in 2015. A 2018 resolution allows local churches to decide about blessings of same-sex marriage. Uniting Network Australia brings together 58 churches in 2025 that support blessings of same-sex marriage.

=== Theologians ===
- Alan Walker
- James Haire
- Bill Loader
- Wesley Wildman
- Benjamin Myers

== Assemblies ==
No.	Date	President	General secretary	Location
1	June 1977	Davis McCaughey	Winston O'Reilly	Sydney
2	May 1979	Winston O'Reilly	O'Reilly (until December 1979)	Melbourne
3	May 1982	Rolland Busch	David Gill (from January 1980)	Adelaide
4	May 1985	Ian B. Tanner	David Gill	Sydney
5	May 1988	Ronald Wilson	David Gill (until July 1988)	Melbourne
6	July 1991	D'Arcy Wood	Gregor Henderson (from January 1989)	Brisbane
7	July 1994	Jill Tabart	Gregor Henderson	Sydney
8	July 1997	John Mavor	Gregor Henderson	Perth
9	July 2000	James Haire	Gregor Henderson	Adelaide
10	July 2003	Dean Drayton	Terence Corkin (from January 2001)	Melbourne
11	July 2006	Gregor Henderson	Terence Corkin	Brisbane
12	July 2009	Alistair Macrae	Terence Corkin	Sydney
13	July 2012	Andrew Dutney	Terence Corkin	Adelaide
14	July 2015	Stuart McMillan	Colleen Geyer (from January 2016)	Perth
15	July 2018	Deidre Palmer	Colleen Geyer	Box Hill, Victoria (Melbourne)
16	July 2021	Sharon Hollis	Colleen Geyer	online
17	July 2024	Charissa Suli	Lindsay Cullen (interim) Andrew Johnson (from October 2024)	Parramatta
