= Redcliffe Fire Station =

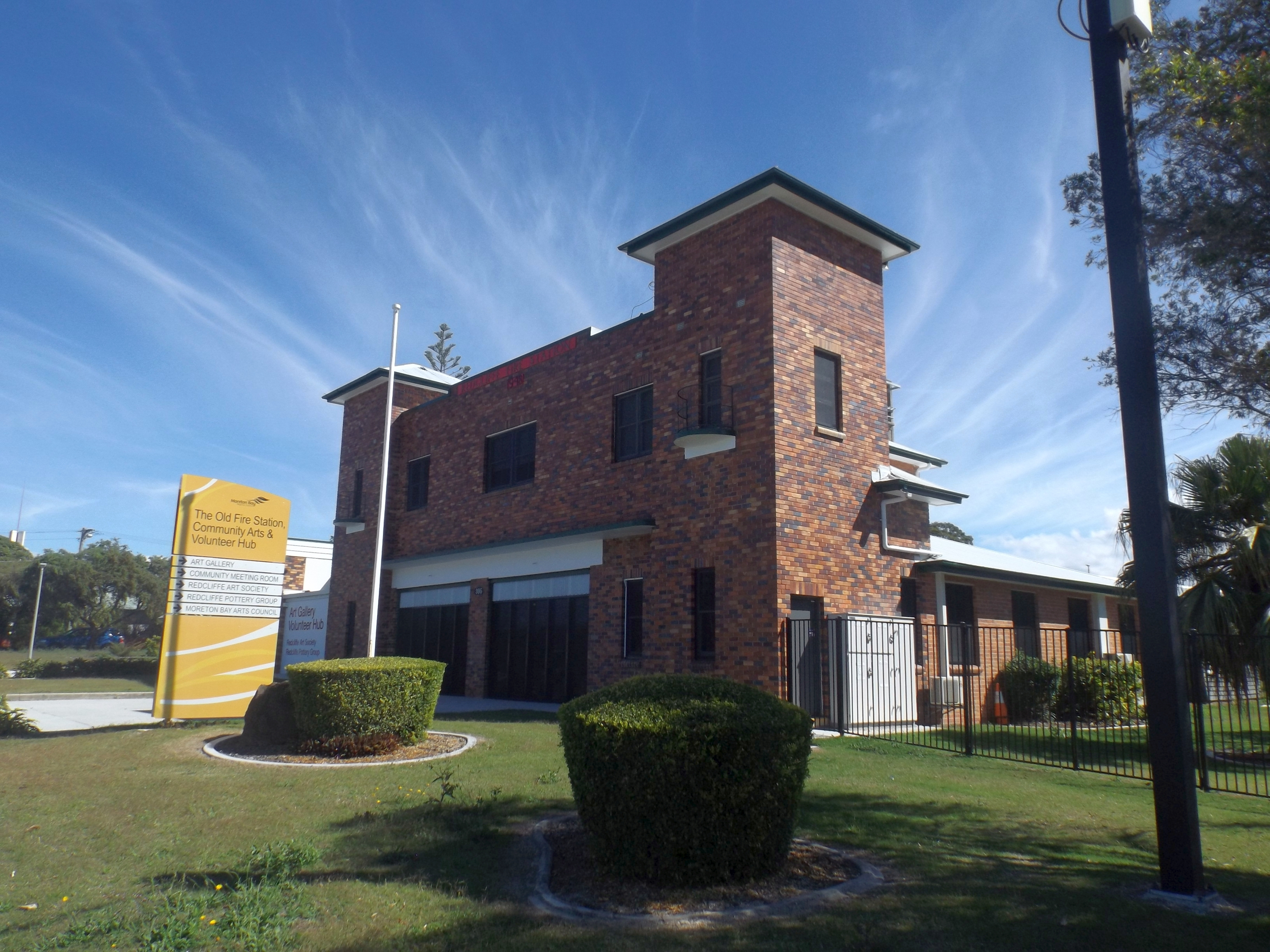
- Building in 2016

- Location within Queensland Location within Australia
- 27.2357°S 153.1079°E
- Location: 395 Oxley Avenue, Redcliffe, City of Moreton Bay, Queensland, Australia

History
- Design period: 1940s–1960s (post-World War II)
- Built: 1948–1949

Site notes
- Architectural style: Classicism

Queensland Heritage Register
- Official name: Redcliffe Fire Station
- Type: state heritage (built)
- Designated: 6 September 2005
- Reference no.: 602548
- Significant period: 1940s (historical); 1940s–1950s (fabric)
- Significant components: tower, office/s, dormitory, views to, watch room, bathroom/bathhouse, kitchen/kitchen house, garage
- Builders: Alex Smith

Redcliffe Fire Station is a heritage-listed former fire station at 395 Oxley Avenue, Redcliffe, City of Moreton Bay, Queensland, Australia. It was built from 1948 to 1949 by Alex Smith. It was added to the Queensland Heritage Register on 6 September 2005.

== History ==
The Redcliffe Fire Station, built in 1948–1949 is a substantial brick building of two storeys. The fire station and its related structures are sited on 1.2 acres of land on the Redcliffe Peninsula, almost midway along Oxley Avenue between Woody Point and Scarborough. Although the fire engine is now housed in the 1973 southern extension of the building, the layout of both the ground floor station, and the first floor residence, remains largely intact.

For many years the Redcliffe area was known as "Humpybong", the name that the local Aboriginal people gave to the abandoned convict settlement (1824–1825) at Red Cliff Point. In 1861 23,000 acres of the peninsula and the Petrie area were declared an agricultural reserve, and from 1862 onwards a number of farm portions were sold. Very little development occurred until the 1880s, although in the late 1870s publicans and shopkeepers began to cluster on the foreshores of the peninsula. In 1878 Charles George Skinner purchased the 32 acres of Portion 196 for £22. This portion included the land on which the fire station now stands. The 1880s land speculation boom in Brisbane extended to the Redcliffe Peninsula, and the area's identity as a seaside resort solidified in that decade. In the Victorian era people considered "taking the air" by the sea to be healthy, and agricultural portions on the peninsula were subdivided and sold as residential estates, for the building of "Marine Residences". Portion 196 was sold as "Redcliffe Point Estate".

The Caboolture Divisional Board cleared the first road on the peninsula, running from Woody Point to Scarborough, in the early 1880s, and this road later became Oxley Avenue. A Police Station, Courthouse, and Post Office were built in 1885, and the Redcliffe Divisional Board was created in 1888. However, the board's office was initially located in Brisbane, and a proper office was not built in Redcliffe until 1902, in the same year that the Redcliffe Shire Council was created. In 1895 there were still 237 farms, covering 4199 acres, at Redcliffe, and agricultural use of much of the land on the Redcliffe Peninsula continued into the 1940s. An aerial photograph taken in 1942 shows that most development had occurred east of Oxley Avenue.

The reduction of Redcliffe's isolation was a slow process, and until the late 1930s it was considered to be a good place to visit, rather than a good place to live. In 1882 a jetty was erected at Woody Point to receive a steamboat from Sandgate, and another jetty was built near Redcliffe Point in 1885. Tourist daytrips to Redcliffe, on the steamer Koopa, started in 1911. The railway reached North Pine in 1888, but was never extended to Redcliffe, despite persistent local lobbying. In 1921, when the Town of Redcliffe was declared, its permanent population was only 1,631, and it contained 432 private dwellings, six Hotels, and 28 boarding houses. An electricity supply was not connected until July 1928. Decent road access was also slow to arrive. Anzac Avenue, running from Petrie to Redcliffe, was originally an Aboriginal track, used to access the "Kipper Ring" (now Kippa-Ring) that was located about three miles northwest of Redcliffe. The tree-lined, bitumen-covered "ANZAC Memorial Avenue" was opened in December 1925.

In October 1935, an event occurred that would accelerate the pace of Redcliffe's development. The opening of the Hornibrook Highway Toll Bridge ended Redcliffe's isolation, and led to a burst of residential development. At 2.7 kilometres (1.7 mi) long, the Hornibrook Bridge was the longest road viaduct over built over water in the southern hemisphere, and it shaved 35 kilometres (22 mi) off the return road trip from Brisbane to Clontarf Point. Many of the 1880s residential allotments were finally sold after the bridge was completed. Between 1933 and 1940 Redcliffe was one of fastest growing local authorities in Australia, with the number of dwellings increasing from 536 to 1865. Redcliffe's population in 1933 was 2,008, and this had risen to 6,000 by 1940. Wartime and post- war building restrictions hampered development until the 1950s, especially in areas viewed as tourist resorts. Redcliffe and the towns of the Gold Coast were the only Queensland towns still subject to building restrictions in 1949, but Redcliffe's population continued to increase, reaching 8,871 in 1947, and 18,000 in 1959, the year that the City of Redcliffe was declared.

In the late 1930s the Redcliffe Town Council's confidence in the future led to a rush to develop public infrastructure. In 1938 decisions were made to develop a reliable water supply, and to build a new town hall. A water storage reservoir and a concrete water tower were built at Duffield Road, but although the water main from Sandgate reached as far as ANZAC Ave by December 1940, piping for household connections was held up by wartime shortages. The official opening of the Redcliffe Water Works occurred on 3 December 1941, the same day as the opening of the new brick Redcliffe Town Council Chambers. The establishment of mains water supply in turn enabled the creation of a Fire Brigade in Redcliffe; a reliable source of water meant that the days of the "bucket brigade" were over, and more effective means of fighting fires could be implemented.

In November 1941 the Redcliffe Fire Brigade Board was formed, and in 1942 the Fire Brigade's first Chief Officer was Frank Mayer, formerly of the MFB. Initial equipment consisted of a Ford Truck, several hundred feet of hose, two hydrants, two branches and one "Y" coupling. Later, an International Howe fire engine, a small Coventry pump, and some fire extinguishers were added. The Redcliffe Fire Brigade was initially housed at a residence on the corner of Webb Street and Maude Street, Margate, and it won praise for its efforts at firefighting during 1943 and 1944. Mayer, who had started as a volunteer fire fighter in Windsor in 1911, died of an illness in June 1945, and was replaced by P.F. MacFarlane, who resigned in 1949. In September 1947 the Australian Loan Council had agreed to lend £8,800 to the Redcliffe Fire Brigade Board, and in 1948 land was resumed for a fire station at the corner of Oxley Ave and Mary Street, the cornerstone being laid that same year.

To help place developments in Redcliffe within the context of fire fighting in Queensland, it is useful to note events and building trends in nearby Brisbane. Brisbane's first fire station had been built in 1869, for the City Volunteer Fire Brigade, established in 1868. The Fire Brigades Act 1881 detailed a new structure for Fire Brigade Boards, and led to the creation of the Brisbane Fire Brigade. The first professional firemen appeared in 1889. In 1890 a brick Headquarters station was built on the corner of Ann Street and Edwards Street, and this was replaced in 1908 with a Headquarters at the corner of Ann Street and Wharf Street. The Fire Brigades Act Amendment Act 1902 allowed local authorities to establish their own volunteer fire brigades, and the Fire Brigades Act 1920 amalgamated the suburban brigades with the central brigade, thereby creating the Metropolitan Fire Brigade (MFB) in 1921.

The MFB operated eight fire stations in 1927, out of the 38 in Queensland. Sandgate built its own station in 1924, and joined the MFB in 1928. By 1949 the MFB operated 14 stations; 11 of these were built of timber, with five of the timber stations being two-storey. Each of Brisbane's three operational brick fire stations in 1949, Headquarters (1908), Woolloongabba fire station (1927), and Albion Fire Station (1927), had two or more floors. In 1941, Hamilton had received a two-storey timber fire station that was modelled on the Coorparoo Fire Station (1935), which had also been the model for Nundah Fire Station (1936) and Wynnum Fire Station (1938). The usual layout of these two-storey timber stations included a central appliance garage on the ground floor, flanked by a recreation room, kitchen, watch room, showers, toilet, laundry, and dormitory. A three bedroom Chief Officer's residence occupied the first floor. The Redcliffe Fire Station shares this basic layout, if not the timber construction. In Brisbane, timber had been the material of choice between 1928 and 1941, and no new fire stations had been built for the MFB between July 1941 and February 1954, when Chermside became the first of Brisbane's "modern" brick fire stations. The Redcliffe Fire Station seems to occupy an architectural niche of its own, when compared to Brisbane's brick fire stations of the 1920s, and the brick fire stations of the 1950s.

The plans for the station at Redcliffe are signed by J.R. Hughes, who is listed in an advertisement from the period as a Quantity Surveyor with the Express Building Company, in Oxley Avenue, Redcliffe. Alex Smith, a well-known local builder, built the fire station. Smith owned the Renown Theatre in Margate (built 1940), and worked on a number of building projects for the military during World War Two. Frank Nicklin, the leader of the opposition, opened the Redcliffe Fire Station, built at a cost of £11,000, on 1 November 1949. The first Chief Officer was Brian Wallace, who served in this position for 28 years.

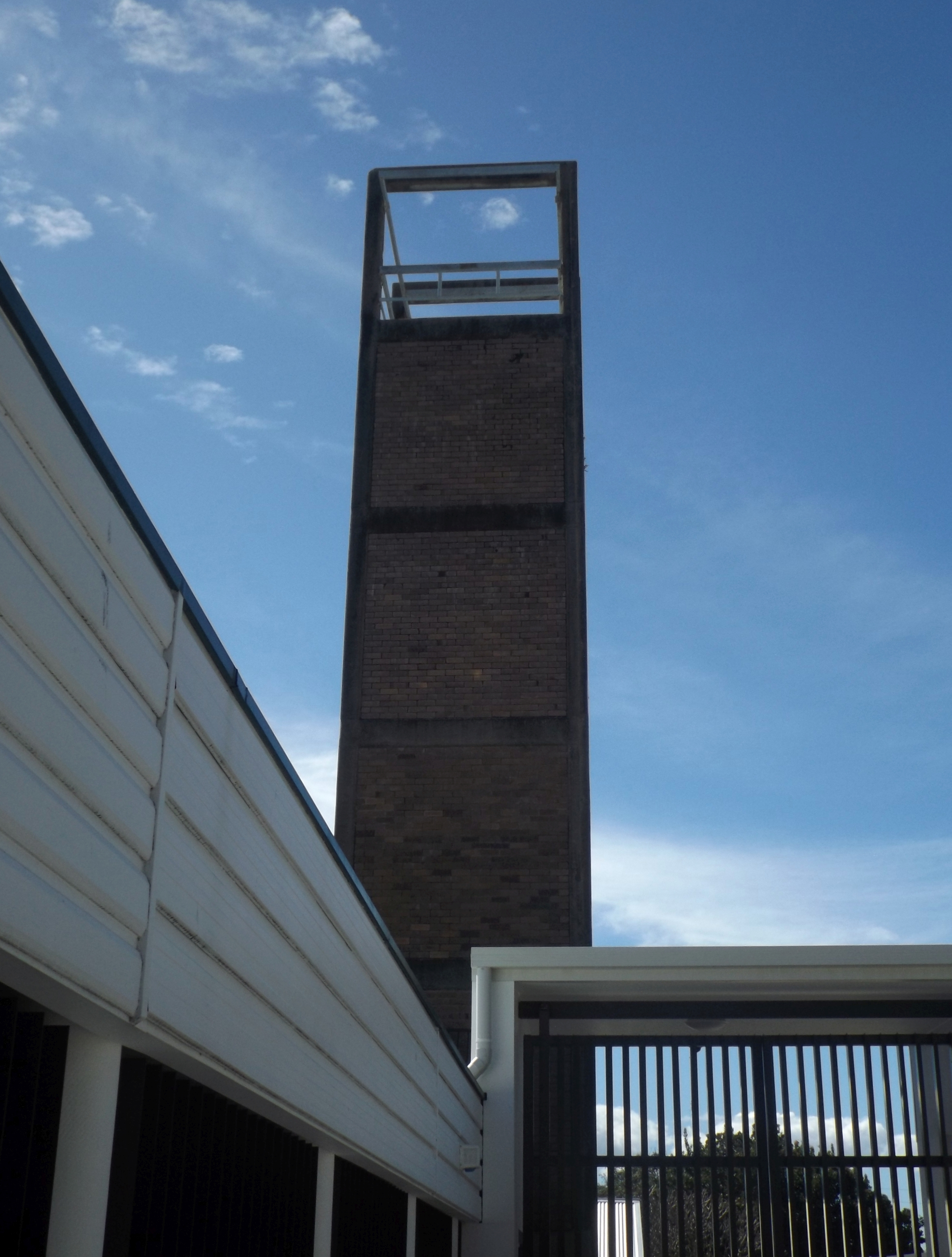
High-rise simulation / hose-drying tower

There have been some alterations and changes to the station over time. There was a watchtower on the original plans, sited above the laundry near the southwest corner of the building, but if this was built it no longer remains. A hose-drying tower and oil store was also built to the west of the recreation room. Only the base storey remains, clad in weatherboards and used as a gym. In 1973 a single-storey red brick extension was added to the south side of the station, designed by Peninsula Architects; a locker room was added south of the kitchen, the dormitory was extended south, and a new office was extended south from the original watch room. The extension also contained a new appliance garage. In 1987 a training centre with an attached high-rise simulation / hose-drying tower was built to the west of the fire station, but the centre is no longer used because of its condition. A tennis court that used to be located in the south west of the property has been removed. Inside the station, the doorway to a toilet, at the rear of the two-bay appliance garage, has been sealed; and the pit in the rear maintenance bay has been filled in. The first floor Chief Officer's residence remains largely intact, although the bedrooms and lounge are now used as offices for the Rural Fire Service.

The fire station had a wishing well and gardens, popular for wedding photos in the 1970s to 1990s.

After being decommissioned as a fire station, Moreton Bay Regional Council (now known as Moreton Bay City Council) spent $2 million to redevelop the fire station as a community centre for arts and volunteering. It was reopened in its new role on 28 February 2015.

== Description ==
The two-storey fire station faces east towards Oxley Avenue, with two square towers flanking its two central roller doors. Above the roller doors, at the roofline, are the words Redcliffe Fire Station 1948. The original station is constructed of multi-coloured red bricks in a stretcher bond, and a modern one-storey extension, constructed with similar materials, protrudes to the south of the station. A large V-shaped metal billboard stands just to the south of the station building, on the Oxley Avenue frontage.

The ground floor of the station contains a central two-bay garage, which is flanked on the north by three original rooms, and a stairway to the first floor in the northeastern tower. South of the two-bay garage are five rooms and an appliance garage. To the west are three rooms, and a maintenance garage, which is an extension of the main double garage. At the northwestern corner of the maintenance garage is the base floor of the original hose tower, and a side garage links the tower to the northern rooms of the station. The first floor contains four main rooms, plus a kitchen, bathroom, and toilet. Each tower also contains a small room. A stairway accesses the enclosed veranda on the west side of the first floor.

Just to the west of the main station, arranged in a row from north to south, are: a timber-clad garage, with two timber earth closets immediately to its west; a small red-brick fuel store with a curved concrete roof; and a five-storey training tower with a two-storey attachment to its west, and an attached one-storey training centre to its south, each of the components being built of red brick with a stretcher bond. The training centre is not of cultural heritage significance. The single-gabled timber garage has four windows on each of its north and south sides, and a loft door above its main entrance faces the rear of the brick fire station.

== Heritage listing ==
Redcliffe Fire Station was listed on the Queensland Heritage Register on 6 September 2005 having satisfied the following criteria.

The place is important in demonstrating the evolution or pattern of Queensland's history.

The Redcliffe Fire Station, along with its older subsidiary buildings, including the base of the old hose tower, the small brick fuel store, the timber garage, and two timber earth closets, is evidence of the development of fire-fighting services in Queensland. It is also evidence of the rapid transformation of Redcliffe from a holiday destination to a residential centre after the construction of the Hornibrook Bridge. The urbanisation of seaside resorts is a pattern in Queensland's history- one that can also be seen at Sandgate, Cleveland, Southport and Yeppoon. The development boom after 1935 was hampered by World War Two, but continued in the post-war period. The Redcliffe Fire Station was part of the Redcliffe Town Council's drive to develop Redcliffe's public infrastructure, and its existence was also made possible by another public work, the provision of a reliable water supply to Redcliffe in 1941.

The place demonstrates rare, uncommon or endangered aspects of Queensland's cultural heritage.

The Redcliffe Fire Station, opened in 1949, has an uncommon external architectural style, in that it resembles neither Brisbane's brick fire stations of the 1920s, nor Brisbane's brick fire stations of the 1950s. During the 1930s, Brisbane's fire stations were built with timber, and no fire stations were constructed in Brisbane between 1941 and 1954. Redcliffe thus preceded Brisbane in the move towards modern brick fire stations.

The place is important in demonstrating the principal characteristics of a particular class of cultural places.

The Redcliffe Fire Station's interior layout demonstrates the principal characteristics of a fire station of the period, which include: accommodation on the first floor for the Chief Officer; a central appliance garage on the ground floor, flanked by a dormitory, recreation room, watch room, showers, toilet, laundry and kitchen; a hose drying tower; an outdoor rear area for vehicle maintenance and cleaning; and close access to a main street. This ground floor plan is substantially intact, and resembles that of the two-storey timber fire stations built in Brisbane in the 1930s. The first floor of the original hose drying tower still remains, and the first floor Chief Officer's residence remains in near-original condition.
