= Brooke Prentis =

Australian Aboriginal Christian leader (born 1980)

- Born: 25 May 1980 (age 46); Redcliffe, Queensland
- Occupations: CEO Common Grace, Indigenous activist

Brooke Prentis (born 25 May 1980) is an Australian Aboriginal Christian leader, who is descended from the Wakka Wakka people. She is the coordinator of the Grasstree Gathering.

== Early life and education ==
Prentis was born in Cairns on Yidinji land and grew up in Redcliffe, Queensland on the lands of the Gubbi Gubbi people. She is a descendant of the Wakka Wakka people. She attended Redcliffe State High School, graduating in 1997. She studied at The University of Queensland gaining a Bachelor of Commerce and a Bachelor of Arts, majoring in Japanese and Political science.

Prentis became a Christian while studying at university through The Salvation Army. She has been a member of various churches including the Uniting Church Australia, and the Anglican Church. She served as a Pastor in Ipswich within The Salvation Army’s Indigenous Ministries.

Prentis is a founding member of the NAIITS (formerly North American Institute for Indigenous Theological Studies) Down Under Whitley College, University of Divinity, Melbourne, an initiative for Masters and PhD level theological education with an indigenous focus. Prentis is studying a Masters in Theology through this program. She is also a scholar of the Australian Centre for Christianity and Culture.

== Career ==
Prentis is a chartered accountant. She worked as an auditor with Ernst & Young for seven years. She has served on the board of World Vision Australia and is a member of the Australian Institute of Company Directors (AICD).

Prentis is a senior fellow at Anglican Deaconess Ministries and is writing a book with funding from the ministries as a resource for Australian Christians and the Australian Church in relationship with Aboriginal peoples.

Prentis has appeared on ABC’s The Drum, NITV’s The Point, Hope 103.2 FM, Soul Search, God Forbid, and Eternity magazine. Journalist Andrew West of ABC Radio National’s Religion and Ethics Report said Prentis is “one of the most prominent and eloquent Indigenous leaders in the church today”.

Prentis is an advocate for reconciliation between indigenous and other Australians, particularly from a Christian perspective. She is the Coordinator of the Grasstree Gathering, a national non-denominational event bringing together Aboriginal and Torres Strait Islander Christian leaders.

Prentis was the Aboriginal and Torres Strait Islander Spokesperson for Common Grace in a volunteer capacity since 2015. From February 2020 to February 2022 she was CEO for the organisation, making her the first indigenous CEO of a Christian organisation in Australia. Prentis believes Australia Day should be recognised as a "day of mourning" and has proposed that Wattle Day should become the country's national day. Prentis and Aunty Jean Phillips have led the #changetheheart movement of prayer and lament in the lead up to January 26. In 2021, the service was simulcast on ACCTV in order to avoid restrictions connected to COVID-19.

In 2021 the Australian Association for the Study of Religion (AASR) Women's Caucus invited Prentis to give the annual Penny Magee Memorial Lecture. The title of her talk was, "Reclaiming hope: Learning from Aboriginal resilience in Times of Disruption".

== Publications ==
- Prentis, Brooke (2017). "Does the hope for reconciliation lie with millennials?". Zadok Perspectives. 137: 19–21.
- Loughrey, Glenn; Prentis, Brooke (2017). "Christian perspectives on treaty". Arena Magazine. 146: 18–19.
- Prentis, Brooke (2019). "Acknowledgement of Country". ANZTLA eJournal. 23 (23): 2–4. doi:10.31046/anztla.v0i23.1529.
- Prentis, Brooke (2019). "Dangerous Memories in the Land We Now Call Australia:Do the Exiles Hear the Call to Country Today" (PDF).
- Prentis, Brooke (2021). "What Can the Birds of the Land Tell Us?". In Jill Firth; Denise Cooper-Clarke (eds.). Grounded in the Body, in Time and Place, in Scripture. Wipf and Stock. pp. 282–299. ISBN 9781725288799.
