= Charissa Suli =

Leader in the Uniting Church in Australia

President of the Assembly, Uniting Church in Australia
- In office 2024–2027
- Preceded by: Sharon Hollis

Personal details
- Born: 1982 or 1983 (age 43–44)
- Spouse: Langi
- Children: 4
- Occupation: Christian Minister
- Known for: First person of colour to serve as President of the UCA

Charissa Suli is an Australian minister who is the President of the Uniting Church in Australia (UCA) since 11 July 2024, for a three-year term. She is the youngest person and first person of colour to serve in this role. She is also the second ordained woman to hold this position.

== Career ==
Suli was called to ministry as part of the Cecil Gribble Tongan Congregation, Dee Why Uniting Church. Suli was ordained in 2014 and served at Dapto Uniting Church, New South Wales. Throughout her ministry in this congregation it became a more multi-cultural church, reflecting the multicultural nature of the broader UCA.

Suli was cross cultural consultant in the NSW/ACT Synod's Board of Mission. She has been the convener of the Tongan National Conference, specialising in mentoring youth and young adults and creating bridges between first and second generation Tongans in Australia.

Suli has been working as a National Consultant in the Assembly Resourcing Unit for the UCA. Suli has been featured on the Australian Women Preach podcast preaching on John 6: 24–35, talking about surprises. She also has written for Common Grace's advent series.

== Election ==
On 18 July 2021, it was announced that Suli had been selected as the President-Elect, succeeding Sharon Hollis in the role. Hollis was the first ordained woman to serve in this role. The first woman to serve as President was Jill Tabart, OAM (1994–1997).

Suli along with Michelle Cook and Viniana Ravetali were the final nominations meaning that the 16th president would be a woman, regardless of the final vote. Haloti Kailahi had been nominated but his nomination was removed before the final vote. She was formally installed as president at a service at St Stephen's Uniting Church in Sydney on 11 July 2024.

== Family ==
Suli and her husband, Langi, have four children.
