= Alex Smith (builder) =

Alex Smith (1899–1973), or Alexander Patterson Blakie Smith, was a noted designer-builder on the Redcliffe Peninsula in Queensland, Australia. His work is now widely recognised as being of heritage significance. All the extant construction by Alex Smith on the Redcliffe Peninsula either has heritage listing or otherwise has official recognition as being of significance.

== Seabrae Guest House ==
This was built by Alex Smith around 1928 and represents a specific era on the history of Redcliffe as a seaside resort. The guest house was popular with visitors from Brisbane and interstate, and was also popular with service personnel stationed in Redcliffe during World War II. This building has since been demolished.

== Dumbarton House ==
This is believed to have been constructed by Alex Smith in the 1930s. Dumbarton House was listed in the Moreton Bay Regional Council (formerly Redcliffe City Council) Local Heritage Register simply on two grounds: a) it represented a modern house, and b) it represented a construction by Alex Smith.

== CWA Hall ==
The CWA Hall, or the Country Women's Association Hall, was constructed by Alex Smith in the 1930s. The Hall is listed of being of heritage value with the Moreton Bay Regional Council Local Heritage Register, and one of the stated reasons for the listing is association with Alex Smith as builder.

== Redcliffe Rollerdrome ==
The Redcliffe Rollerdrome, built by Alex Smith, was opened by in 1938. The Rollerdrome was a roller-skating rink on the beachfront at Redcliffe, and was representative of a number of such venues popular around Queensland in that era. The Rollerdrome was demolished in 1985.

== Renown Theatre ==
Initially known as the Margate Theatre, this was constructed by Alex Smith in 1940. The Theatre served as a cinema, concert hall and ballroom, and was especially popular with service personnel stationed in Redcliffe during World War II It was during World War II that the Theatre was renamed the Renown Theatre, as part of a plan to avoid locality names which might assist invading Japanese forces. The building was demolished in 1971.

== Redcliffe Fire Station ==
The Redcliffe Fire Station was constructed by Alex Smith and opened by the then Opposition Leader Sir Frank Nicklin on 1 November 1949. The construction of the Fire Station was part of a concerted action at the time by the then Redcliffe Town Council to develop its infrastructure. In 2005 the structure was placed on the Queensland Heritage Register.

== Waltzing Matilda Motel ==
This is an example of modern early 1960s motel design and was constructed by Alex Smith in 1963–64 The official opening was on 1 April 1964 as the venue of a Rotary Convention. The motel features the ample use of brick which typified the era, as well as an angled design to give guests a sea view. The Waltzing Matilda Motel is featured in the Queensland Places Directory, published by the University of Queensland, as one of the landmarks for the seaside suburb of Margate and is recognised locally as an important part of the history of Margate and the Redcliffe Peninsula.
