= Sidney William Prior =

Australian architect

Sidney William Prior (1894–1952) was an architect in Brisbane, Queensland, Australia. He designed the heritage-listed Redcliffe Town Council Chambers.

== Early life ==
Sidney William Prior was born about May 1894 in Croydon, London, England, the son of William Edward Prior and his wife Alice Mildred (née Bigg). Aged 15, he immigrated with his family on the Rippingham Grange departing London on 28 August 1909 and arriving in Brisbane on 21 October 1909. He studied construction and drawing at the Brisbane Central Technical College in 1913 before serving in the First World War.

== Architectural career ==
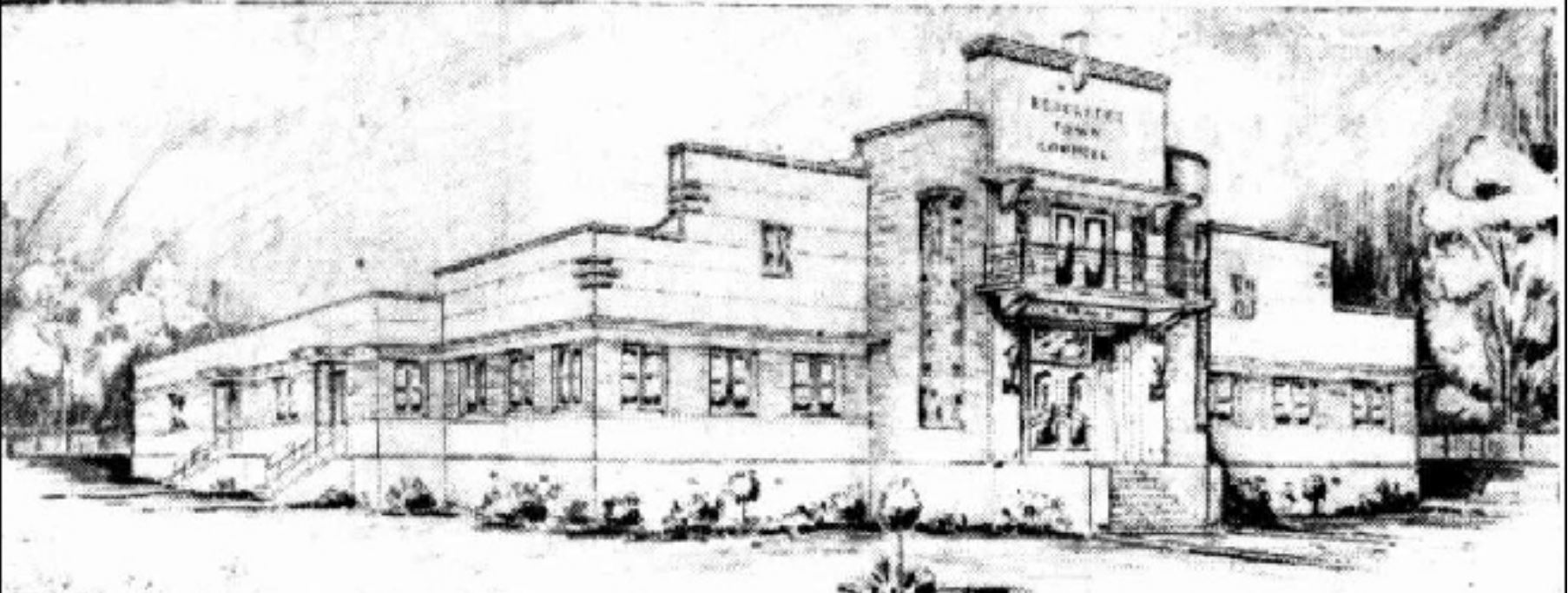
Sketch of proposed Redcliffe Council Chambers, 1940

Prior established his architectural practice in Brisbane in 1923 after having worked for a short period with the Commonwealth Government as a draftsman. A large proportion of Prior's work was domestic though he designed Hesketh House in Elizabeth Street, additions to the Jennings Rubber Company Building in Fortitude Valley and the Davies Park Speedway at Bowen Hills.

In 1940 he designed the Redcliffe Town Council Chambers.

== Later life ==
Prior died in Brisbane on Thursday 31 January 1952; he was survived by his wife and daughter. He was cremated at the Mount Thompson Crematorium on 2 February 1952.
