= Aunty Jean Phillips =

Indigenous Australian Christian leader

Aunty Jean Phillips is an Indigenous Australian elder and has been a senior Aboriginal Christian leader for over 60 years. She was born on the Aboriginal mission of Cherbourg, Queensland and later she served as an Aboriginal missionary herself with the Aborigines Inland Mission (AIM).

== Early life and education ==
Phillips was born on Wakka Wakka country in southern Queensland on the Cherbourg Aboriginal mission.

As an Aboriginal Christian woman, Phillips lived under the same Australian government policies that targeted members of the Aboriginal and Torres Strait Islander community. This included Aboriginal people being denied an education, denied a proper wage, and not being considered Australian citizens until the 1967 Australian referendum.

== Ministry ==
Phillips has been a Christian Indigenous leader for over 60 years, a strong and vocal advocate for justice, and has primarily served members of the Indigenous community in Brisbane. She has mostly served those living in poverty, bringing to light the need for better housing and employment, as well as raising awareness about the truth of Australia's history. Phillips work has made a significant contribution to building bridges between indigenous and non-Indigenous Australians.

Phillips started her ministry working as an Aboriginal missionary with the Aborigines Inland Mission (AIM). She has continued her ecumenical work well into her eighties, serving many Aboriginal communities and churches of all denominations. Her work has encouraged a new generation of Aboriginal Christian leaders as well as challenged non-Aboriginal people to address injustice, in order "To build a better Australia for all Australians".

As part of NAIDOC Week 2018 Phillips was interviewed by Brooke Prentis from Common Grace (Australia). In the interview Phillips spoke about some of the Aboriginal Christian women who had inspired her. Despite suffering injustice and poverty, to Phillips these women were inspirational examples of courage and faithful Christian service.

Phillips and Lea Maslen created the #ChangetheHeart movement. This movement calls on Christians to gather, for prayer services and for truth telling about past injustices and discrimination still faced by Aboriginal people and for subsequent action and justice. These prayer services, that seek to promote acknowledgement and understanding of Australia's First Nations People, are held each year on Australia Day in every Australian state and territory and in several regional centres.

In 2021 a portrait of Phillips by indigenous artist Stevie O'Chin was one of the finalists in the Brisbane Portrait Prize.

In the 2022 Brisbane NAIDOC Awards Phillips received the Community Person of the Year Award.

== Selected publications ==
Phillips, Jean & Lampert, Jo. (2005). Introductory indigenous studies in education: the importance of knowing. Frenchs Forest, N.S.W.: Pearson Education Australia. ISBN 9780733972669
