= Redcliffe State High School =

Location
- Redcliffe, Queensland; Australia; 27°13′24.36″S 153°06′36.72″E

Information
- Type: Public; co-educational; Secondary school; day school
- Motto: Faire sans Dire (Deeds without Words)
- Established: 3 February 1958
- Principal: Barry Wallett
- Enrolment: 1,400 (2024)
- Campus: Redcliffe
- Colour: Blue
- Website: redcliffeshs.eq.edu.au

Redcliffe State High School is an independent, public, co-educational, secondary school, located in the City of Moreton Bay town of Redcliffe in Queensland, Australia. It is administered by the Department of Education. The school serves students from Year 7 to Year 12.

== History ==
The school initially opened on 3 February 1958, on the eastern side of Oxley Avenue, with sporting facilities on land on the other side of side of the avenue. In order to meet growing demand, the school classrooms have since spread onto the land where the sports fields once were. A pedestrian bridge linking the two campuses was constructed after a student was killed crossing the road in 2006.

== Social issues ==
The school's LGBTQI+ student group introduced pronoun badges in 2021. It was the first school in the State to do so.

The school plays an active role in promoting National Sorry Day, NAIDOC Week, Anzac Day, Remembrance Day, Harmony Week (for diversity), Respect Week (for inclusivity), a "Multicultural Showcase Event", White Ribbon Day (to campaign against domestic violence towards women), International Women's Day and Wear It Purple Day (to support the LGBT movement).

The school does not offer any religious instruction classes.

The school follows the National Curriculum for Drug and Alcohol Education. In a 2016 newspaper interview, the principal said, "Teachers use their discretion and professionalism when [substance abuse] issues arise."

=== Indigenous education ===
The school is a central hub for indigenous education. Some students have worked to achieve ATSIC Queensland's "Young, Black and Proud" awards. The school also runs the "Deadly Choices" program for junior and senior students. There is also an "Indigenous Pathways" program at the school.

In 2023, the school held a "Night of Culture" organised by PASIFIKA and the school's First Nations teachers. The evening was opened by First Nations people and featured an Acknowledgment of Country and a traditional welcome dance, followed by performances by students, staff and community members. The aim of the night was to promote "tolerance". Also, since 2022, the school has elected First Nations students as school captains. The principal declared that, by having school captains, the teachers were "trying to increase our students’ voice and agency".

The school strives to embed "Aboriginal and Torres Strait Islander perspectives across learning areas."

== Facilities ==
Instead of using detention to punish misbehaving students, the school utilises an area called "The Blue Room". The school describes it as "a centre that provides support and guidance to students who are having difficulties managing their own behaviour... The focus of the support provided in the Blue Room is to enable students to better understand their behaviour and how to moderate their performance in the classroom and in the school grounds."

The school has a performing arts centre known as "The Bird's Nest" and a professional-standard visual arts facility called "Studio Red".

There is also a cybercafe on campus.

The school has its own graffiti wall for students.

In 2019, some of the school's buildings were listed on the Queensland Heritage Register.

== Special curriculum programs ==
The school has an "Excellence in Women's [Rugby League] Football Program." It has also pioneered a brewers' training course.

The QUTeach@Redcliffe program enables senior secondary students from disadvantaged schools in the area, including Redcliffe State High School, to commence teacher education degrees while completing secondary school studies.

== Demographics ==
Redcliffe State High School has an enrolment of 1,400 students and a teaching staff of 121, as of 2024. The student population is 53% males and 47% females. 7% of students are Indigenous.

In 2019, fewer than 15% of parents wanted their children to receive religious instruction at the school.

== Academic performance metrics ==
The school performed below the national average when compared to "All Australian students" in the Year 7 reading and spelling, grammar and numeracy categories and the Year 9 reading category in the 2024 NAPLAN tests (with no comparative data available for Year 9 spelling, grammar and numeracy). Student participation in the NAPLAN tests was 12% below the national average.

The school has never been able to achieve a State Overall Score of 90, meaning it has never been ranked among the top 160 high schools in the state according to this metric. On a simplified scale, the results show that the school's performance was rated two out of five for every year between 2016 and 2021.

It is also consistently ranked outside the top 100 high schools in the state based on the Better Education Rank metric. Its best ranking was 110 in 2013 and its worst was 307 in 2017.

For every year from 2012 to 2020, the performance of the school's English department, (which was headed by Shelley Troedson), was rated 2 out of 5 by bettereducation.com.au. For most of those same years, the mathematics department was rated 3 out of 5. In 2021, the English department's result fell to 1 and the mathematics department's to 2.

The school has an ICSEA rating of 997.

The number of students successfully attaining vocational education qualifications in Management and Commerce has fallen from 85 in 2014 to just 27 in 2024 under Daniel McKennariey.

== Parent and student satisfaction metrics ==
According to a survey of parents contained in the school's 2023 annual report, there was a steady 7% decline over the three years to 2023 in the belief that teachers at the school were motivating their child to learn, a 5% decline in the belief teachers were treating students fairly, a 7.6% decline in the belief parents could talk to teachers about their concerns, a 3.6% decline in the belief parents could collaborate with teachers, a 7.7% decline in the belief teachers took parents' concerns seriously and a 7.9% decline in the belief that student behaviour at the school was well-managed.

In the same report, only 67.8% of students surveyed said they felt safe at the school, 60.9% of students felt teachers treated students fairly, 50.6% of students felt they could talk to teachers about their concerns, 50.0% of students felt teachers took students' opinions seriously and just 46.2% of students felt that student behaviour was well-managed.

== Attendance ==
In semester one of 2024, the student attendance rate was 84% with only 46% of Non-Indigenous students and 39% of Indigenous students attending school 90% of the time or more.

== Incidents ==
In 2010, asbestos was found in garden mulch at the school. The Courier-Mail newspaper alleged that this was kept secret from parents and students in "a deliberate and elaborate cover-up. Department chiefs told school principal Shona McKinlay to keep the danger secret after deciding the risk was "minimal" once safeguards were brought in."

In 2014, a parent alleged his daughter was told to sit out the NAPLAN tests because her previous performances were poor, in order to make the school's overall results look better.

Also in 2014, the school caused controversy when it barred students from the formal if enrolment payments were not finalised. A parent alleged that their "child had been told they could not attend the formal as they were on a payment plan for their fees." According to the Courier-Mail, this policy left community opinion "divided".

There have been multiple complaints of misconduct and bullying by senior staff towards student-teachers attending practicums at the school.

In 2016, there was a bomb threat at the school.

In 2017, there was a second bomb threat.

In 2018, a program called "Respect — Commit To It" was introduced in an attempt to counter the high levels of abuse and violence directed towards staff by students.

Also in 2018, the school was badly damaged in a graffiti attack by students amidst its International Respect Day celebrations.

In 2019 the school was caught twice promoting a trade union campaign. In the first instance, which occurred "weeks before a federal election", the school posted flyers on its buildings and fences and also some "campaign material was distributed in the students’ homework folders to take home". The school's principal was also interviewed on a union website. In the second instance, which occurred four months later, the school was caught again, this time using its Facebook page to promote the same union campaign. Evidence of this misconduct was tabled in the Queensland Parliament by the LNP.

In 2020, a student was murdered after a drug deal went wrong.

In 2021, a number of students were rushed to hospital after drinking Gatorade spiked with wiper fluid by another student.

In 2021, the media reported the school was put into lockdown when students brought knives on campus with the intention of fighting. The school denied the students drew the weapons.

In 2022, video emerged of one female student from the school violently attacking another outside a supermarket.

In 2023, the Courier-Mail newspaper stated there was a "fight club" culture amongst students at the school. One incident was captured on video. It showed a "girl being struck multiple times in the head".

In 2025, the school taught the wrong topic for an examination.

== Notable alumni ==
- Mark Bradtke, basketballer.
- Tom Butterfield, Papua New Guinean rugby league player.
- Luke Capewell, rugby league player.
- Daly Cherry-Evans, rugby league player and gay rights supporter.
- Petero Civoniceva, rugby league player
- Yvette D'Ath, politician, Australian Labor Party.
- Martin Kent, cricketer, Queensland and Australia.
- Teagan Micah, Australian footballer, LGBT athlete.
- Brooke Prentis, Aboriginal activist, former CEO of the left-wing political lobby group, Common Grace.
- Roman Quaedvlieg, disgraced former Commissioner of the Australian Border Force.
- Joel Romelo, rugby league player and convicted criminal.

== Notable staff ==
- Kevin Bates, trade unionist (former president of the Queensland Teachers' Union, federal secretary of the Australian Teachers' Union) and opponent of religious instruction in state schools.
- Ariana Doolan, former teacher's aide, Netflix actress.
- Michael Macklin, English-born radical-left Roman Catholic friar, politician (Australian Democrats), environmentalist, philosopher, supporter of Vietnam veterans, advocate for prosecuting former Nazis residing in Australia, member of the National Native Title Tribunal, Director of Development at the University of Queensland and early gay rights campaigner.
- Denis Murphy, politician, Australian Labor Party.
