= Redcliffe State High School buildings =

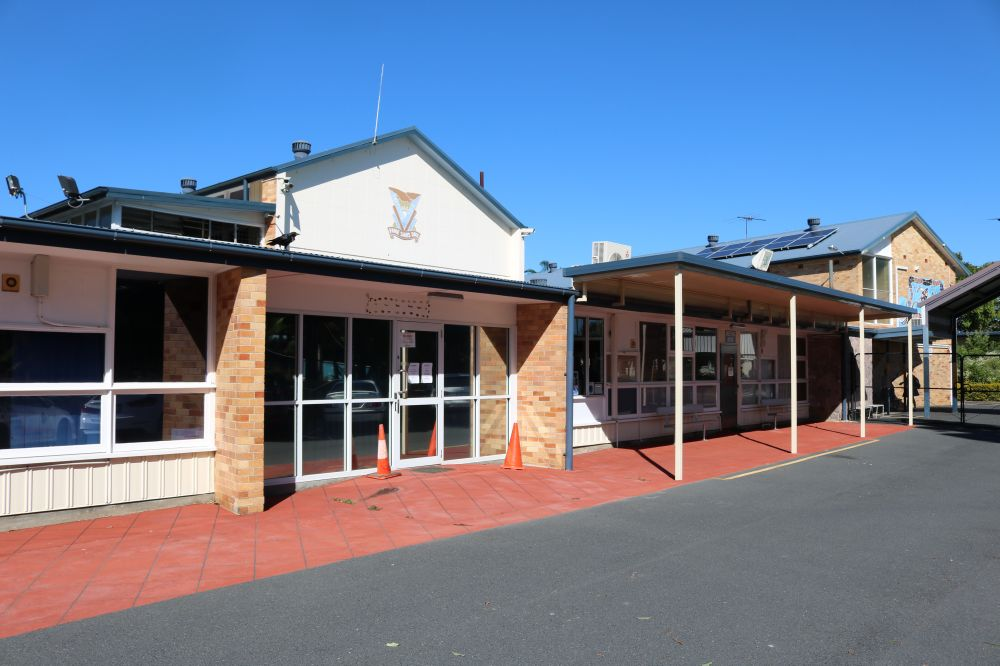
- Block A (administration) in foreground and two-storey classrooms buildings Block B (left) and Block C (right) behind, 2018

- Location within Queensland
- 27.2235°S 153.1118°E
- Location: corner of Klingner Road & Oxley Avenue, Redcliffe, City of Moreton Bay, Queensland, Australia

History
- Design period: 1940s–1960s (Post-WWII)
- Built: 1958, 1959, 1959, 1959, 1960, 1960, 1962

Queensland Heritage Register
- Official name: Redcliffe State High School
- Type: state heritage
- Designated: 31 May 2019
- Reference no.: 650066
- Type: Education, Research, Scientific Facility: School – state (high)
- Theme: Educating Queenslanders: Providing secondary education

Redcliffe State High School buildings are a group of heritage-listed buildings at Redcliffe State High School on the corner of Klingner Road and Oxley Avenue, Redcliffe, City of Moreton Bay, Queensland, Australia. They were built between 1958 and 1962. They were added to the Queensland Heritage Register on 31 May 2019.

== History ==
Redcliffe State High School opened in 1958 as the first state high school on the Redcliffe Peninsula. The school retains its seven original school buildings built between 1958 and 1962, which were designed by the Department of Public Works to provide abundant natural light and ventilation for optimal educational environments. These standard buildings are arranged on the site according to 1950s nuclear master planning ideals, providing outdoor courtyard assembly and play areas and retaining pre-existing mature trees. The complex includes three vocational training buildings, built between 1959 and 1962.

The Redcliffe Peninsula is part of the traditional lands of the Kabi Kabi people, and was briefly the site of the Moreton Bay penal settlement at Redcliffe Point (1824–5). For many years the Redcliffe Peninsula was known as "Humpybong" (dead house), the name the Kabi Kabi, gave to the abandoned convict settlement. A 23,000 acre (9302ha) Redcliffe Agricultural Reserve, which included the peninsula, was declared in 1861, followed by the sale of farm portions from 1862. Some coastal portions were subdivided for "marine villas" in the late 1870s-early 1880s, when the peninsula was promoted as a resort, but few subdivisions were actually occupied at this time. Steamers initially provided the main access to Redcliffe, with jetties constructed at Woody Point (1882) and Redcliffe Point (1885). By 1890 steamers were bringing 10,000 day-trippers and holidaymakers per year, although there were still only 352 permanent residents on the peninsula in 1891.

Redcliffe did not develop as a residential centre until road transport links improved. Anzac Memorial Avenue was opened from Petrie to Redcliffe in December 1925, and the population boomed after the Hornibrook Highway Bridge was opened in October 1935. The population of the Town of Redcliffe (declared in 1921) grew from 8,871 in 1947 to 18,000 in 1959, the year the City of Redcliffe was declared, and this strong growth continued into the 1960s. In 2008 the City of Redcliffe became part of the Moreton Bay Region, which was renamed City of Moreton Bay in July 2023.

The earliest school on the peninsula, the Humpybong Provisional School, opened in Clontarf in 1876. The Redcliffe Provisional School opened at Redcliffe in 1888. Humpybong State School opened in Margate in 1909. The peninsula's first private secondary school, Soubirous Convent School in Scarborough in 1951. However, the peninsula did not have a public secondary school for another seven years when Redcliffe State High School opened in 1958, followed by the opening of Clontarf Beach State High School in 1964. Although the Queensland Government had instituted a high school system in 1912, high schools remained few in number until after World War II.

The site of Redcliffe State High School was once part of Portion 226 of the Redcliffe Agricultural Reserve. By 1905 2.26ha of land at the northwest corner of this portion was a reserve for railway purposes. The North Coast railway line reached North Pine (now Petrie) in 1888. Despite a branch railway line to the Redcliffe Peninsula being proposed in the 1880s, it was not until 2016 that the Redcliffe Peninsula railway line was opened. In 1885, a 2-acre (0.8ha) Reserve for Post and Telegraph Office was surveyed in the northeast corner of Portion 226, with a 5-acre (2.0ha) Reserve for Police Purposes to its south. In 1936 the unused railway reserve was leased by Claude AM Reid, of Lone Pine Koala Sanctuary in Indooroopilly (now in Fig Tree Pocket), who opened a koala park and zoo on the site in October 1937. The former railway reserve and koala park was gazetted as a "reserve for a state school" in 1945. The government also acquired 6.5ha of the northern part of the showgrounds, opposite the school reserve and west of Oxley Avenue, in 1947 for a school sports ground.

Another decade passed before a high school was built. In 1954 it was reported that high school enrolments in Queensland had more than doubled since 1948, from 4,500 to nearly 11,000. An enormous demand for state education began in the late 1940s and continued well into the 1960s. This was a nation-wide occurrence resulting from immigration and the unprecedented population growth now termed the "baby boom".

Plans for the first four school buildings at Redcliffe State High School were prepared by the Department of Public Works (DPW) in August 1957. In 1956 the high school site was still covered in trees. During a period of high demand for more classroom accommodation, from the mid-1950s DPW architects introduced school master planning, a concept to plan for controlled growth and change. During the period emphasis shifted away from grid-like layouts to nuclear layouts, centred on a nucleus of core facilities. The plans balanced the need for correct orientation and an appropriate response to contours and existing vegetation. Generous courtyard spaces between classroom wings were used for assembly and play areas. Redcliffe State High School followed this nuclear master planning approach.

The school opened in 1958 with 107 students, either on 3 February or in October. By May that year only Block C had been constructed, set in a cleared section of the treed school reserve; as at 2019 some trees which predate the school still survive. Blocks A, B, and D were completed by mid-1959.

Block A was a one-storey, slab-on-ground administration building constructed at the front of the school on the west side of the complex, facing Oxley Avenue. It had an asymmetrical gable roof and a splayed feature wall leading through large doors into a foyer at the north end of the building. The building accommodated: three offices (for the Principal, Deputy Principal, and staff), toilets, staffroom, and a store. The corridor featured school honour boards. A large dais at the rear (east) of the building faced directly into the understorey of the adjacent Block B, which was open and two steps lower. Although not identified as a standard type, very similar administration buildings have been identified at Mitchelton State High School (built in 1959) and Rockhampton State High School (drawn in 1960).

Blocks B and C were built to a standard design (Timber Framed School Building incorporating steel open-web floor trusses). From 1950 the Department of Public Instruction introduced new standard plans for school buildings designed by the DPW. These buildings were high-set timber-framed structures and the ground floor "understorey" was used as covered play space. The principal type was a long and narrow building with a gable roof. A semi-enclosed stair connected the understorey to a north-facing verandah running the length of the building. Classrooms opened off the verandah and had extensive areas of windows, allowing abundant natural light and ventilation. In 1954 this type was improved by replacing the proliferation of stumps in the understorey with a timber truss that provided an unimpeded play space. This concept was further refined in 1957 with a steel open-web joist, set on reinforced concrete piers, that spanned further and removed more understorey stumps. The design was further refined in 1959 by replacing the concrete piers and open-web joist with a steel portal frame that was employed extensively in the 1960s and 1970s. Blocks B and C at Redcliffe were of this latter type, which had a standard classroom size of either 24 ft (7.3m) square or 24 ft by 21 ft (7.3m by 6.4m).

Blocks B and C projected east from each end of Block A, forming a courtyard which widened towards the east. Block B was connected to the rear (east) of the northern end of Block A. It was a long, narrow, brick veneer, timber-framed building with its long sides facing north and south. It had a gable roof and was highset, with an open play area in the western half of the ground floor and a female ablutions block (lockers, toilets, and showers) in the eastern half. The first floor was supported by exposed open-web steel floor trusses on concrete columns, with a cantilevered portion supporting a northern verandah that had a bagracks balustrade. Protruding stairwells on the north side, enclosed with brick and glass, gave access to each end of the verandah. The first floor included a small staffroom and six classrooms, including: a physics lecture room with tiered gallery; physics lab; physics store/balance room; and four standard classrooms (three of which were initially used for domestic science classes). The rooms were well-lit and ventilated with awning windows used extensively on the southern wall, and double-hung windows in the verandah wall with pivoting clerestory fanlights above the verandah roof.

Block C was similar to Block B and was attached by a partially-enclosed covered area to the south end of Block A. The ground floor accommodated: a library; chemistry lecture room, lab, and store room; and male ablutions. The first floor had a northern verandah accessed by stairs at both ends; the east end stairs were enclosed with fixed glass. The verandah had a section of fixed glazing at its west end. The first floor accommodated: a small general classroom 24 ft by 15 ft (7.3m by 4.6m); four standard-sized general classrooms (three combinable by large folding doors); and a commercial room, 32 ft by 24 ft (9.8m by 7.3m). It was described as having "clean, simple lines, characteristic of new schools".

The east ends of Blocks B and C were connected to Block D, a vocational training building. Standard, purpose-designed vocational buildings were first introduced to high schools in 1928. The Queensland Government continued its focus on vocational education during the 1950s and 1960s and a number of new standard building types were developed for manual training from the late 1950s.

Block D was built to a standard building type, the Brick Veneer Vocational Building. It was a one-storey, concrete slab-on-ground building with an open-web steel portal frame structure. The building oriented its long sides east–west and a covered walkway ran along part of the west side. Varying from the standard, it was slightly boomerang-shaped with an open-sided, wedge-shaped "vestibule" at the elbow and two classrooms at either end. It had a skillion roof over the vestibule and gable roofs over the classrooms. The northern classrooms were 25 ft by 25 ft (7.6m by 7.6m) drawing rooms and the southern classrooms, for woodwork and for sheet metalwork, were both 25 ft by 30 ft (7.6m by 9.1m). At this end was also a timber store, saw bench room, and corridor. The rooms were well-lit and ventilated with banks of awning windows with fanlights of glass louvres on the eastern side, and double-hung windows and a clerestory of glass louvres above the walkway roof on the western side.

An open-sided, steel-framed covered way connected the covered walkway of Block D north to the end of Block B, capturing a wedge-shaped courtyard between Blocks A-D. This open, flat area was used as an "Assembly Area" and had a bitumen surface. A small courtyard area to the side of this space, between Blocks C and D, had a concrete-edged triangular garden bed in its centre.

Redcliffe's population increased to 23,500 by 1963, and increasing enrolments at Redcliffe State High School resulted in the construction of three new buildings in three years - Block E and F during 1960, and Block G in 1962. Blocks E and F were built north of, and parallel to, Block B. Block E was built to a standard type similar to Blocks B and C. It was a long, narrow, brick veneer, timber-framed building with its long sides facing north and south. It had a gable roof and was highset. The ground floor accommodated two locker rooms, an open play area with a tuckshop, an armoury (for military cadets), and small storerooms under the stairs. The first floor was supported by exposed open-web steel floor trusses on concrete columns, with a cantilevered portion supporting a northern verandah with a bagracks balustrade. The first floor had six standard-sized classrooms, with folding doors between two pairs of classrooms, and a "services room" at the east end. The verandah had projecting stairwells at each end, enclosed with brick and glass.

Block F was built to a standard floor plan layout for home science classes, and was a one-storey, concrete slab-on-ground, timber-framed vocational training building with a gable roof. It was a long, narrow brick veneer, timber-framed building with its long sides facing north and south and was attached to the west end of Block F via a breezeway. It had a verandah on its north side with bagracks and a hat and coat area at each end. It had a dressmaking room with fitting room; storeroom; staffroom; laundry; dining room; cooking room; and lecture room. The rooms were well-lit and ventilated with awning windows and fanlights used extensively on the southern wall, and double-hung windows in the verandah wall with louvred clerestory windows above the verandah roof. There was a small concrete flower bed north of the east end of the building. A covered walkway was also built at this time to connect Block E across the courtyard to the east end of Block B.

Block G was built to a standard type (Brick Veneer Vocational Building with skylight) east of Block D. It was a one-storey, steel portal-framed building with an east-facing clerestory roof. It was long and narrow, with its long sides facing east and west and a covered walkway along the west side. The building accommodated woodwork and drawing rooms. A small staffroom, store, and machine room were accommodated in a small projecting annexe with a gable roof. The rooms were well-lit and ventilated with banks of awning windows, fixed glass panes, and fanlights used extensively in the east and west walls, and via the clerestory, which had metal blade louvres and was positioned centrally over the work rooms.

With the construction of Block G for woodwork and drawing, Block D was converted for use as two sheet metalwork rooms and one art classroom. Minor alterations included enclosing part of the covered walkway using some relocated original windows and walls, removing partitions, and sheeting over the western windows of the former drawing rooms. This work was planned in late 1961.

Between 1962 and 2018, other buildings were added to the school, including:

- Block H (1963), an extension at the east end of Block B for science and general classrooms
- Block J (1965) science classrooms
- Block K (1972) general classrooms (extended 1973)
- a P&C assembly hall (1977, replaced 2014)
- Block L (1979), a library

Buildings were also constructed on the "Western Campus" on the opposite side of Oxley Avenue after 1981. After a 13-year-old student, Caitlin Hanrick, was killed while crossing Oxley Avenue in December 2006, a pedestrian bridge was constructed to link the campuses opening in October 2008 as "Caity's Crossing".

Changes to the early buildings have occurred over time, including:

- adding more toilet cubicles at the east end of Block B (c. 1963)
- adding enclosures and partitions under the east end of Block E (c. 1971)
- enclosing the vestibule of Block D for a further art room (1979)

Later changes included:

- extending and refurbishing Block A to the north for more offices (1981)
- converting Block E to Domestic Science and Block F to general classrooms (1982), both of which involved considerable internal alterations
- two small extensions were added to the east side of Block D (1984).

Block A was refurbished again in c. 2001 and in c. 2002 the ground floor of Block B was altered to include a uniform shop (by remodelling part of the toilets); and a cybercafe was added on the ground floor of Block E, by enclosing some of the open space adjacent to the tuck shop, which had by then been extended one bay to the west. In 2004 a ground floor locker room in Block C was converted into a technology and interview room.

The school grounds have also increased in size over time. By 1974 the school reserve had been expanded to 3.13ha to incorporate an opportunity school established to the east of the high school in 1964 (on part of the 1885 police reserve). A residential lot, south of the school, was added to the grounds in 1980, providing access to Irene Street, and in 1989 land was added at the northeast corner of the school grounds, to create a total area of 3.37ha. In 1960, 3.0ha of land north of Klingner Road, opposite Portion 490, was also obtained and later cleared as an additional sports ground. This was subdivided in 1996, and the western half later became a TAFE campus.

Since its establishment, the school has been the focus of community events, such as fetes, and a fashion show was held in 1977 to raise funds for the first assembly hall. For the school's 50th anniversary in 2008, a DVD was compiled with a collection of photos, documents and newspaper articles from the school's history.

Redcliffe State High School, established in 1958 as the first state secondary school on the peninsula, has played an important role in the Redcliffe peninsula community and continues to do so. Generations of students have been taught there. As at 2019 it retains:

- Blocks A to F, which, as a complex, represent an excellent, intact example of 1950s master planning
- Blocks D, E and G, three examples of vocational building types
- a number of mature trees on the site which may predate the school

== Description ==
Redcliffe State High School occupies two sites east and west of the intersection of two main thoroughfares in Redcliffe, Oxley Avenue and Klingner Road. The east site is 3.37ha and comprises a complex of buildings and a stand of mature trees on the north edge standing inside the school allotment on the boundary with Klingner Road.

The features of state-level significance are:

- Block A
- Blocks B, C, and E
- Block D
- Block F
- Block G
- Courtyards and landscape features

=== Block A ===
Block A is a one-storey, slab-on-ground administration building facing west to Oxley Avenue.

=== Blocks B, C, and E ===
Blocks B, C, and E are standard classroom buildings, highset on concrete pillars with open-web steel floor trusses supporting the timber-framed first floor. Blocks B and C are highly intact. The buildings are two-storey, long and narrow with long sides facing approximately north and south, positioned to form courtyards between them for student lunch and activity space. They feature extensive areas of facebrick across both levels and have gable roofs clad with corrugated metal sheets. Verandahs run along the north side of the buildings, connecting to stairs, breezeways, and covered links, and a series of classrooms and ancillary school rooms along the south side. Both long sides are extensively glazed with operable windows and fanlights to permit high levels of natural light and ventilation.

=== Block D ===
Block D is a slab-on-ground one-storey vocational training building and is highly intact. It is boomerang shaped with a large wedge-shaped vestibule at the elbow separating two manual arts workshops from a third large manual arts room. The rooms have a gable roof with a steel open-web portal frame, exposed internally. The vestibule, originally open-ended but later enclosed, has a lower skillion roof and is used as a manual arts lecture room. The building has a covered way on its western side that links from the covered stair of Block C to a freestanding covered way through the courtyard to Block B.

=== Block F ===
Block F is a slab-on-ground one-storey former vocational training building built to a standard floor plan. It is a long narrow building with its long sides facing north and south and has a covered walkway on the north side accessing a series of classrooms on the south side. It is timber-framed with facebrick veneer walls and the walkway wall is clad with narrow chamferboards. It has a gable roof over the classrooms and a separate, lower roof over the walkway with banks of north-facing metal-framed glass louvres between the two roofs opening into the classrooms. The building is attached by its eastern end to Block E via an open breezeway that has a connection to Block B via a covered way. The original roof sheets and the north and south windows, fanlights, and doors have been replaced (some within the original openings). The original internal partitions have mostly been demolished and new partitions inserted to form general classrooms. The internal linings have been replaced with flat sheets with no cover strip.

=== Block G ===
Block G is a slab-on-ground one-storey vocational training building to a standard design and is highly intact. It is a long narrow building with its long sides facing east and west. It accommodates a series of workshops accessed by an external walkway along the west side. The structure is a steel portal frame with an east-facing clerestory window of metal louvres into the classrooms. The exterior is clad with crimped metal sheets and facebrick, which defines the building's corners. A gable-roofed projection on the south end of the building accommodates a small staffroom and storeroom. The east and west sides of the building have large banks of steel-framed awning windows (some fixed closed, an original condition) and glass louvre fanlights.

=== Courtyards and landscape features ===
The school complex includes courtyards and open spaces to provide abundant natural light and ventilation to the buildings and accommodate student play, lunch, and activity space.

== Heritage listing ==
Redcliffe State High School buildings was listed on the Queensland Heritage Register on 31 May 2019 having satisfied the following criteria.

The place is important in demonstrating the evolution or pattern of Queensland's history.

Redcliffe State High School (established in 1958) is important in demonstrating the evolution of state education and its associated architecture in Queensland. The place retains excellent, representative examples of standard government designs that were architectural responses to prevailing government educational philosophies, set in landscaped grounds with mature trees and assembly areas.

It is also important as a demonstration of the Queensland Government's provision of substantial high schools on new, master planned sites in booming population centres across Queensland in the 1950s, a time of pronounced population growth.

The layout of the administration and classroom blocks, the covered links between them and associated open spaces, reflect the mid-1950s introduction of organic master planning, which responded to the existing contours of the site and provided for ordered growth from a nucleus.

The three vocational training buildings (Block D 1958–9, Block F 1960, and Block G 1962) reflect the Queensland Government's focus in the 1950s and 1960s on vocational training.

The place is important in demonstrating the principal characteristics of a particular class of cultural places.

Redcliffe State High School is important in demonstrating the principal characteristics of a Queensland state high school of the 1950s and 1960s. These include its: site planning; range of highset and lowset timber and brick teaching buildings of standard designs that incorporate understorey play areas, verandahs, and classrooms with high levels of natural light and ventilation; and a generous, landscaped site with mature shade trees and assembly areas.

The school site planning is intact and illustrates the school master planning concepts introduced by the Department of Public Works in the 1950s, comprising long narrow classroom blocks (Blocks B, C, D, E, and F 1958–60) linked around open-ended courtyard assembly and play spaces, connected to a core administration building (Block A 1959).

Blocks B and C (Timber Framed School Buildings incorporating steel open-web floor trusses) are good intact examples of their standard types. The buildings retain their: highset form; trusses; open play space underneath classrooms; north-facing, open verandahs; abundant natural light and ventilation of the classrooms; and 24 ft (7.3m) wide classrooms.

Blocks D and G (Brick Veneer Vocational Buildings) demonstrate the principal characteristics of state high school vocational training buildings from the mid-20th century in Queensland. They are highly intact, retaining their: brick veneer, concrete slab-on-ground, and steel portal frame construction; vented clerestory; large, open workshop spaces with minimal and durable internal finishes; and high levels of natural light and ventilation.

The place has a strong or special association with a particular community or cultural group for social, cultural or spiritual reasons.

Redcliffe State High School has a strong and ongoing association with past and present pupils, parents, staff members, and the surrounding community through sustained use since its establishment in 1958. The place is important for its contribution to the educational development of Redcliffe, with generations of children taught at the school, and it has served as a prominent venue for social interaction and community focus. Contributions to its operations have been made through repeated local volunteer action, donations, and the Parents and Citizens Association.
