= Sharon Hollis =

Minister in the Uniting Church in Australia

President of the Assembly, Uniting Church in Australia
- In office 2021–2024
- Preceded by: Deidre Palmer
- Succeeded by: Charissa Suli

Moderator, Synod of Victoria and Tasmania UCA
- In office 2016–2019
- Preceded by: Dan Wootton
- Succeeded by: Denise Liersch

Personal details
- Spouse: Michael (deceased)
- Children: 2
- Education: Monash University
- Occupation: Christian Minister

Sharon Hollis is an Australian Minister, was the 16th President of the Uniting Church in Australia. She is current the Associate General Secretary of the Uniting Church in Australia in the Synod of Victoria and Tasmania.

== Early years ==
Hollis grew up from 8-13 in Keilor Park in Melbourne, Victoria. From 13, the family lived in Finley, a town in the Riverina region of New South Wales.

== Education ==
Hollis received a degree of Bachelor of Arts from Monash University in Melbourne. It was during her degree studies that Hollis did a subject on the portrayal of women in Australian society, and this formed her views on feminism. She also attended the Monash Uniting Church.

== Ministry ==
Hollis discerned a call to ministry shortly after university, then went through the Uniting Church's discernment process before being accepted as a candidate for ministry. Following further studies in theology, she was ordained as a Minister of the Word.

Hollis was Moderator (leader) of the UCA Synod of Victoria and Tasmania from 2016-19.

== Family ==
Hollis' husband Michael, to whom she was married for 19 years, died by suicide around 2013. They have two daughters.

== President of the UCA ==
Hollis became President Elect of the UCA at the 15th Assembly in 2018, and was inducted as President at the 16th Assembly on 17 July 2021, held with very few people in Queensland and online due to COVID-19.

Also, the 16th Assembly elected the President Elect, Charissa Suli to serve as President from 2024-27. She said, "This is truly an historic moment for the Church. This is ground-breaking that you call a Second Generation Tongan Australian, still in her thirties. Today we move forward because of you all."

Religious titles
Preceded by Deidre Palmer	President of the Assembly, Uniting Church in Australia; July 2021 - 2024	Succeeded by Charissa Suli
