= Redcliffe, Queensland =

Redcliffe
- Town
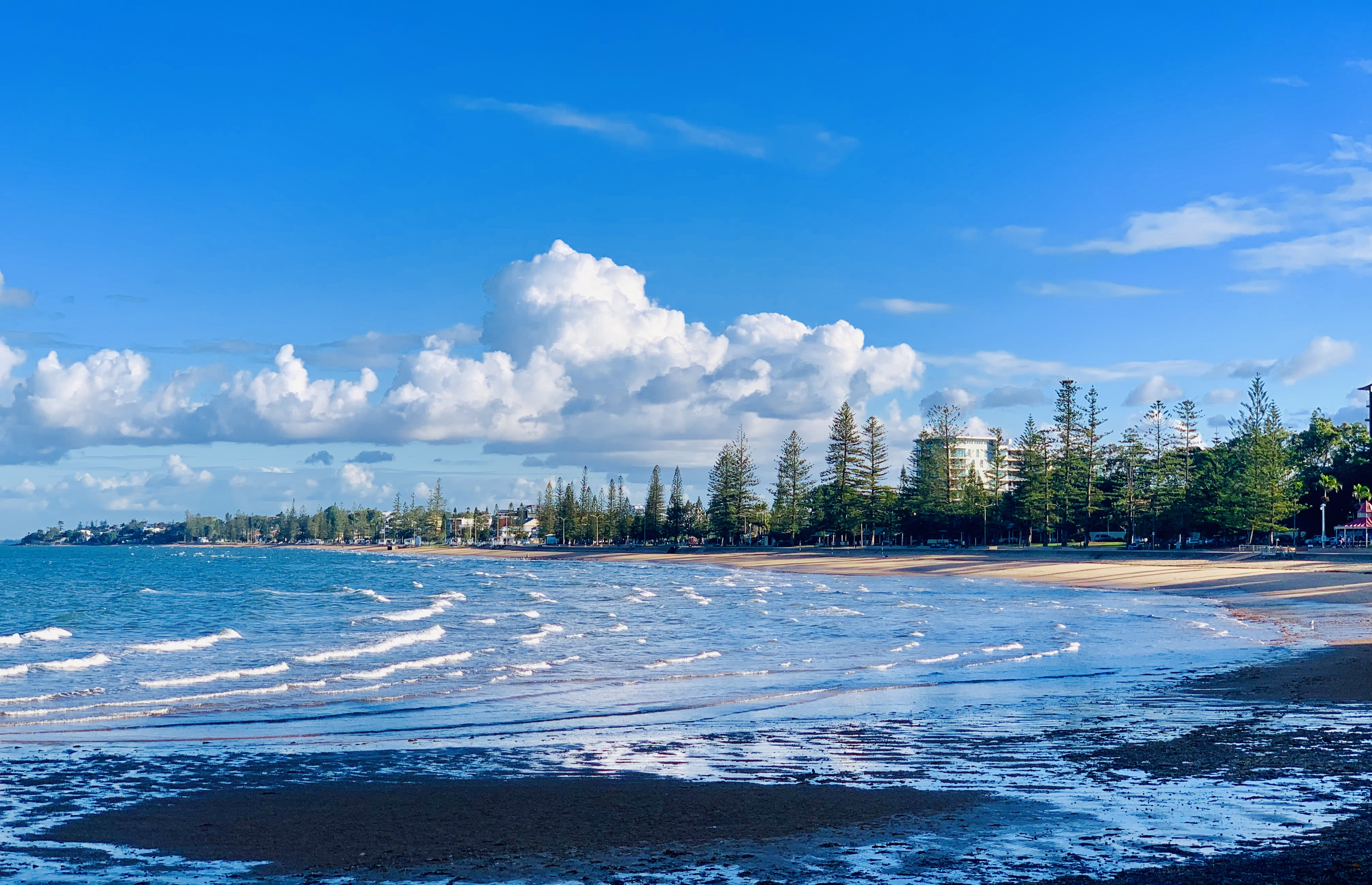
- Suttons Beach, 2019

- Interactive map of Redcliffe
- Coordinates: 27.2278°S 153.0750°E
- Country: Australia
- State: Queensland
- LGA: City of Moreton Bay
- Location: 19.8 km (12.3 mi) NE of Strathpine; 28.1 km (17.5 mi) SE of Caboolture; 32.1 km (19.9 mi) NNE of Brisbane CBD; 71 km (44 mi) S of Caloundra
- Established: 13 September 1824

Government
  - State electorate: Redcliffe
  - Federal division: Petrie

Area
  - Total: 4.2 km^{2} (1.6 sq mi)
- Elevation: 12 m (39 ft)

Population
  - Total: 10,460 (2021 census)
  - Density: 2,490/km^{2} (6,450/sq mi)
- Time zone: UTC+10:00 (AEST)
- Postcode: 4020
Localities around Redcliffe
Newport	Scarborough	Moreton Bay
Kippa-Ring	Redcliffe	Moreton Bay
Margate	Margate	Moreton Bay

Redcliffe is a coastal town and suburb in the City of Moreton Bay, Queensland, Australia. It also refers colloquially to the Redcliffe Peninsula as a whole, a peninsula jutting into Moreton Bay which contains several other suburbs. Since the 1880s, Redcliffe has been a popular seaside resort in South East Queensland. In the 2021 census, the suburb of Redcliffe had a population of 10,460 people.

== Geography ==
Redcliffe is situated in the east north-east of the Redcliffe Peninsula on the western shore of the Moreton Bay. It is approximately 28 kilometres (17 mi) north-north-east of the Brisbane CBD. It serves as the Central Business District for the Redcliffe Peninsula and its surrounding suburbs.

== History ==
Before European settlement, the Redcliffe Peninsula was occupied by the Ningy Ningy people. The Aboriginal name is Kau-in-Kau-in, which means Blood-Blood (red-like blood).

A famous Ningy Ningy Bora ring structure, consisting of two separate rings, large and small, joined by a ritual pathway, once existed between Kippa-Ring and Anzac Avenue. Aboriginals as far away as Noosa would travel there to perform initiation ceremonies. It was razed by the Council around 1950.

The town's name originates from "Red Cliff Point" named by the explorer Matthew Flinders, referring to the red cliffs at Woody Point. Redcliffe became Queensland's first colony in 1824; however, it was soon abandoned for Brisbane.

Redcliffe holds the distinction of being the first European settlement in Queensland, first visited by Matthew Flinders on 17 July 1799. Explorer John Oxley recommended "Red Cliff Point" – named after the red-coloured cliffs visible from Moreton Bay – to the Governor Thomas Brisbane for the new Moreton Bay penal colony, reporting that ships could land at any tide and easily get close to the shore.

The penal colony was established at Redcliffe on 13 September 1824, under the command of Lieutenant Henry Miller with 14 soldiers, some with wives and children, and 29 convicts. However, this settlement was abandoned after one year and the colony was moved south to a site on the Brisbane River at North Quay, 28 km (17 mi) south, that offered a more reliable water supply. This settlement lead to the establishment of Brisbane, now Queensland's capital city.

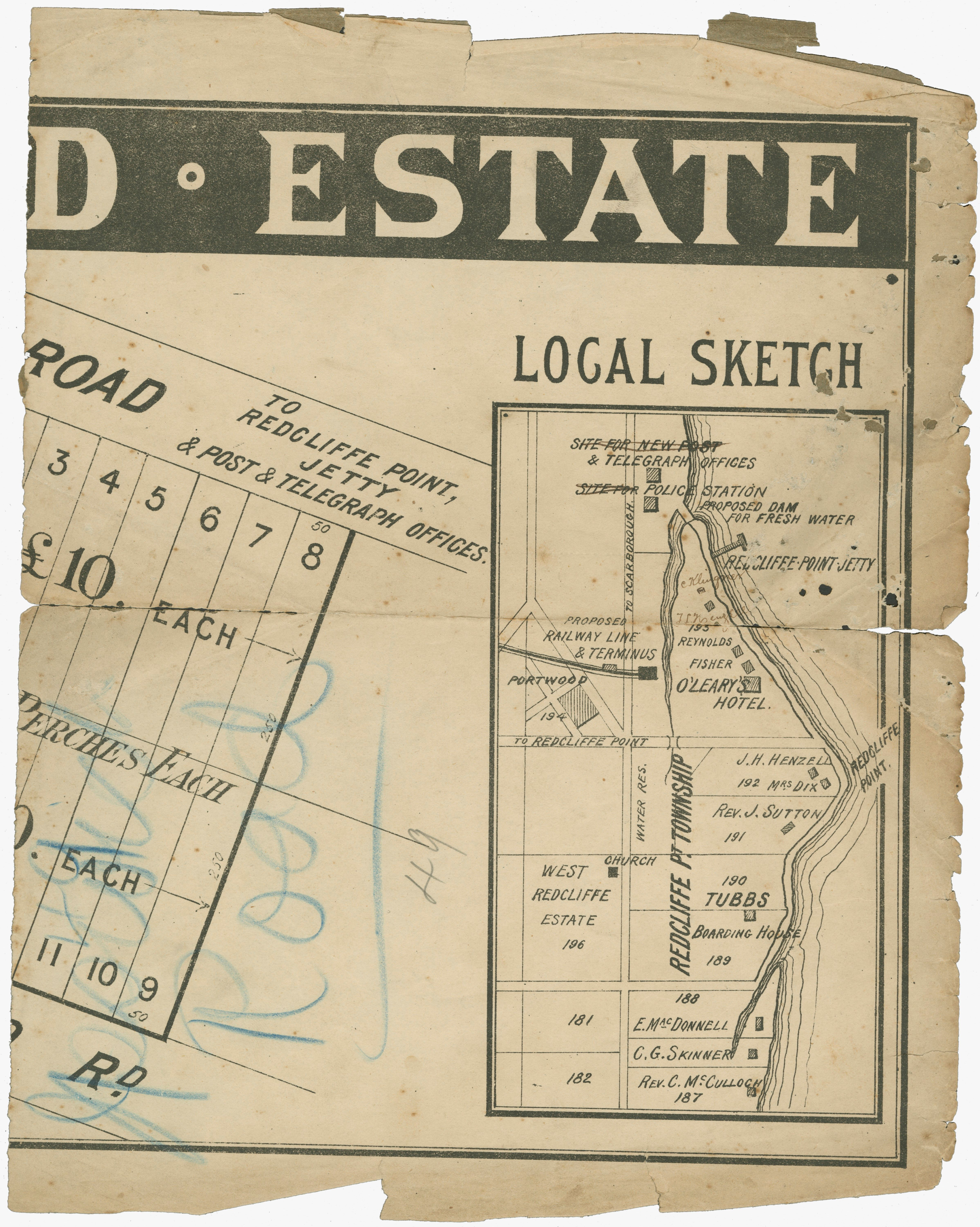
Portwood Estate map, 1878, showing the Redcliffe railway line and railway station

Redcliffe became a pastoral district in the 1860s and in the 1880s boomed as a seaside resort town. In 1878, a suburban subdivision called Portwood Estate (around the present day Portwood Street, Sheehan Street, and Sylvin Street) was offered for sale, with the lots described as "large, elevated, picturesque, salubrious, with rare perspective" in Humpy Bong which was to be "the fashionable watering place of the future!". The estate map shows the Redcliffe railway line terminating at a railway station just to the north-east of the estate (in the area of present-day Macnaughton Street). However, the Redcliffe Peninsula railway line was not opened until October 2016 (138 years later) and the terminus was located in neighbouring Kippa-Ring.

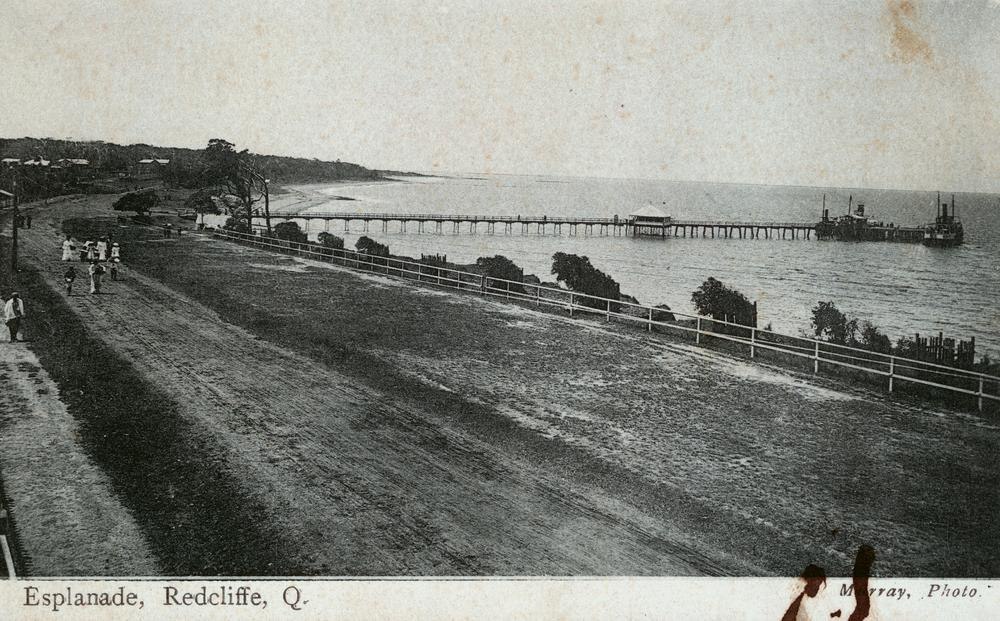
Beachside path, 1906

In October 1881, approximately 60 allotments of "Ramsgate Estate" were advertised to be auctioned for sale by Arthur Martin & Co, being subdivisions 1 to 60, of portion 205 in the Parish of Redcliffe.

Redcliffe State School opened circa 1888. It closed in 1909 when a new Humpybong State School was opened on a central site to amalgamate Redcliffe State School and the old Humpybong State School.

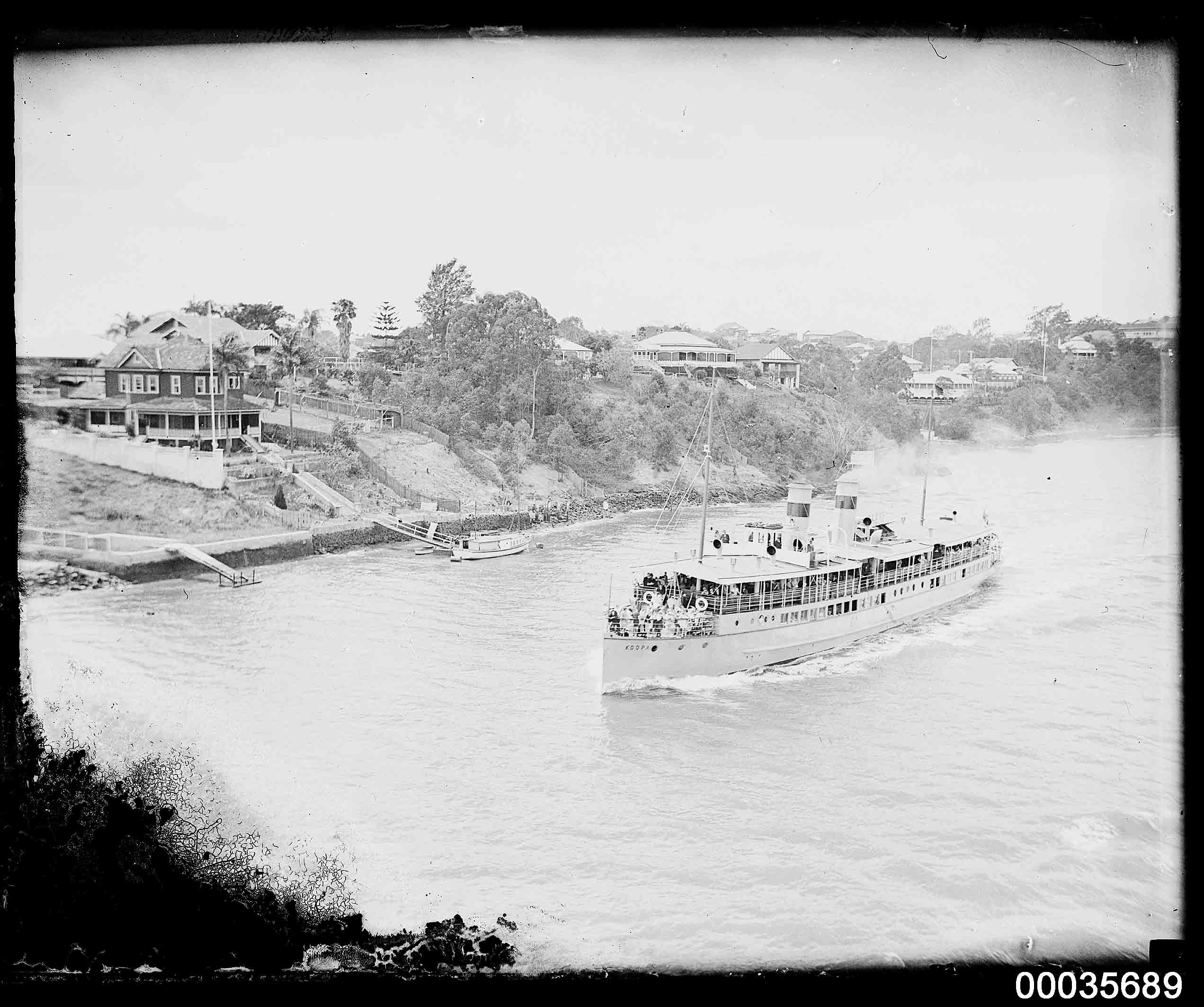
Koopa on the Brisbane River

From 1911, the twin screw excursion steamer Koopa made regular trips to Redcliffe jetty. The principal route for passengers was a steamer from Sandgate pier to Woody Point Pier. The Hornibrook Bridge connecting Clontarf in the Town of Redcliffe to Brighton in City of Brisbane was completed in 1935 and allowed easy access to and from Brisbane by motor car leading the way to rapid suburban development. That led to the cessation of the Sandgate to Woody Point steamers.

Our Lady Help of Christians School opened in January 1922. It closed on 24 May 1995.

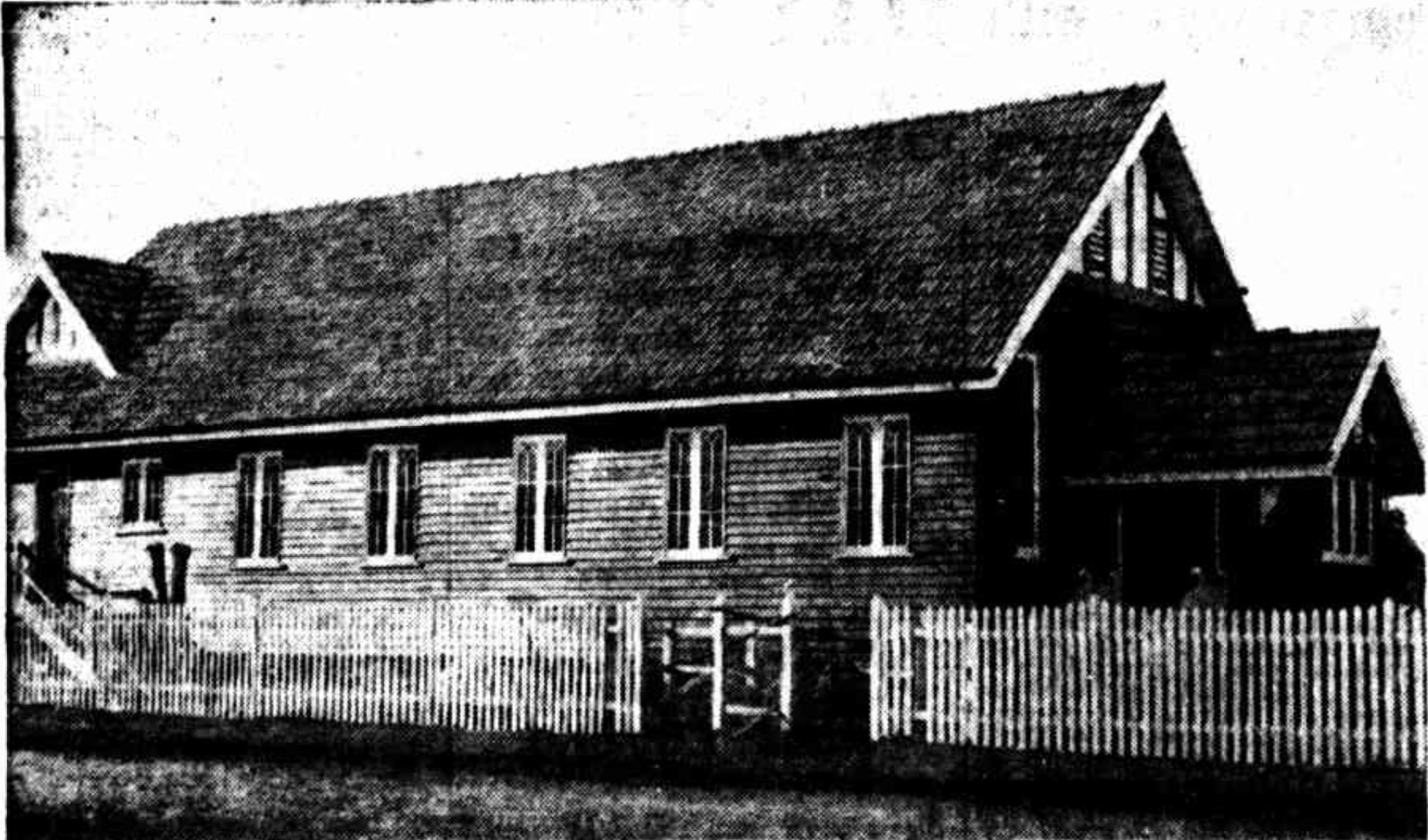
Redcliffe Presbyterian Church in Prince Edward Parade, recently completed, December 1937

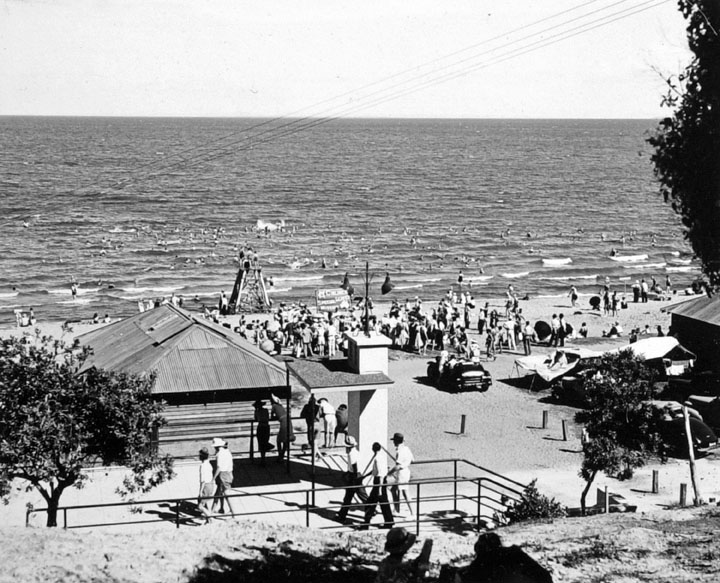
Crowds at the beach, 1937

In 1937 a Presbyterian church was built on Prince Edward Parade at Queen's Beach near Eversleigh Road. It was officially opened on Saturday 18 December 1937 by the Reverend James Gibson, Moderator of the Presbyterian Church of Queensland; the ceremony was attended by William Forgan Smith, the Queensland Premier, and Alfred H. Langdon, Mayor of Redcliffe. The two lots of land for the church had been purchased on 29 April 1920, adjacent to the Queensland Presbyterian Women's Missionary Union house, "The Haven".

Redcliffe State High School No 2045 opened on 3 February 1958.

In 1958, the Gibb family from Manchester, England emigrated to this area and called it home for a period. Barry, Robin and Maurice Gibb went on to form the highly successful music group, The Bee Gees. In 1959, Brisbane based Speedcar driver Bill Goode, the promoter of the Redcliffe Speedway (located at the Redcliffe Showgrounds) hired the brothers to entertain the crowds at the speedway from the back of a truck during the interval. This was the first ever public performance by the trio. In a letter to the Redcliffe Museum in 1999, Barry Gibb wrote "The smell of the oil, the noise and the atmosphere was incredible. This was the first public appearance Robin, Maurice and I ever made in Australia. We sang through the PA system and people threw money onto the track, and we met Brisbane's leading DJ and racing car driver Bill Gates, who suggested we call ourselves the BG's and even played our songs on his radio show, "Swinging' Gates' Platter Chatter". Hence Redcliffe became the birthplace of the Bee Gees."

Redcliffe Opportunity School opened on 2 March 1964. In 1989, it was renamed Redcliffe State Special School.

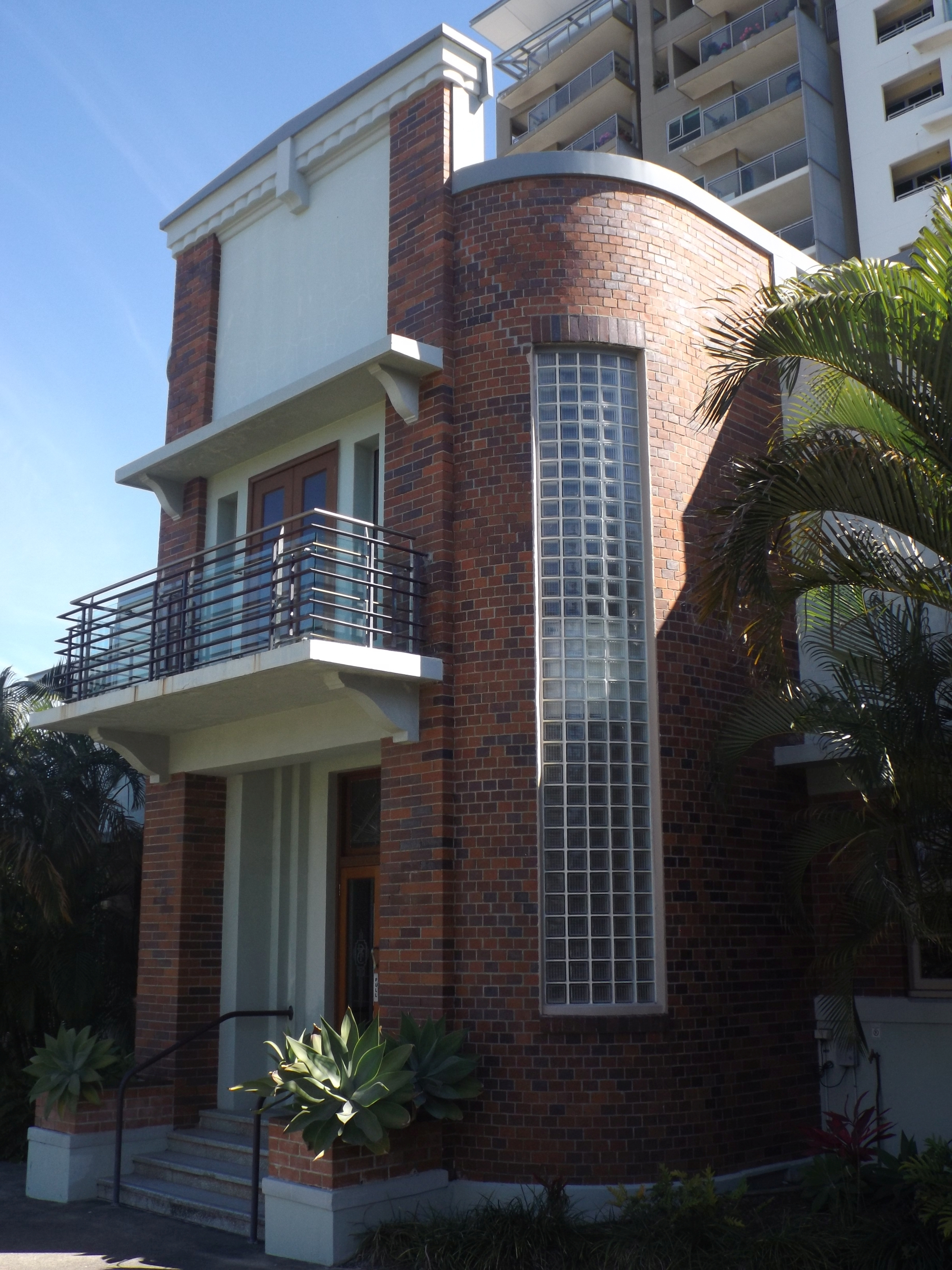
The former Redcliffe Town Council Chambers, 2016

The first high-rise apartment building was constructed along Marine Parade in 1974. For decades the interest for similar development was limited – until 2000 there were only four apartment buildings higher than 6 stories across the entire Peninsula. Renewed interest in Redcliffe as a seaside lifestyle precinct occurred in the 2000s and 2010s and as a result high rise and mix use development is found in all areas of Redcliffe along the coastline.

In 1975, the toll on the Hornibrook Highway was removed.

The current Redcliffe Library opened in 2000.

== Demographics ==
In the 2011 census, the suburb of Redcliffe had a population of 9,201 people, 52% female and 48% male. The median age of the Redcliffe population was 44 years of age, 7 years above the Australian median. Children aged under 15 years made up 15.5% of the population and people aged 65 years and over made up 20.7% of the population. 68.4% of people living in Redcliffe were born in Australia, compared to the national average of 69.8%; the next most common countries of birth were England 7%, New Zealand 6.3%, Scotland 1%, Philippines 0.8%, Netherlands 0.7%. 86.8% of people spoke only English at home; the next most popular languages were 0.5% Italian, 0.4% Tagalog, 0.4% German, 0.3% Dutch, 0.3% Samoan.

In the 2016 census, the suburb of Redcliffe had a population of 10,373 people.

In the 2021 census, the suburb of Redcliffe had a population of 10,460 people.

== Heritage listings ==
Redcliffe has a number of heritage-listed sites, including:

- Anzac Memorial Avenue
- Redcliffe State High School buildings, corner of Klingner Road and Oxley Avenue (27.2235°S 153.1118°E)
- Redcliffe Fire Station, 395 Oxley Avenue
- Comino's Arcade, 133–137 Redcliffe Parade
- former Redcliffe Town Council Chambers, 185 Redcliffe Parade

== Education ==
Redcliffe Special School is a special primary and secondary (Kindergarten to Year 12) school for boys and girls at Klingner Road (27.2232°S 153.1132°E). In 2018, the school had an enrolment of 121 students with 33 teachers (28 full-time equivalent) and 46 non-teaching staff (28 full-time equivalent).

Redcliffe State High School is a government secondary (7–12) school for boys and girls at the corner of Klingner Road and Oxley Avenue (27.2236°S 153.1110°E). In 2018, the school had an enrolment of 1,319 students with 110 teachers (102 full-time equivalent) and 52 non-teaching staff (35 full-time equivalent). It includes a special education program.

There are no mainstream primary schools in Redcliffe. The nearest government primary schools are Scarborough State School in neighbouring Scarborough to the north, Kippa-Ring State School in neighbouring Kippa-Ring to the west, and Humpybong State School in neighbouring Margate to the south.

== Attractions and features ==
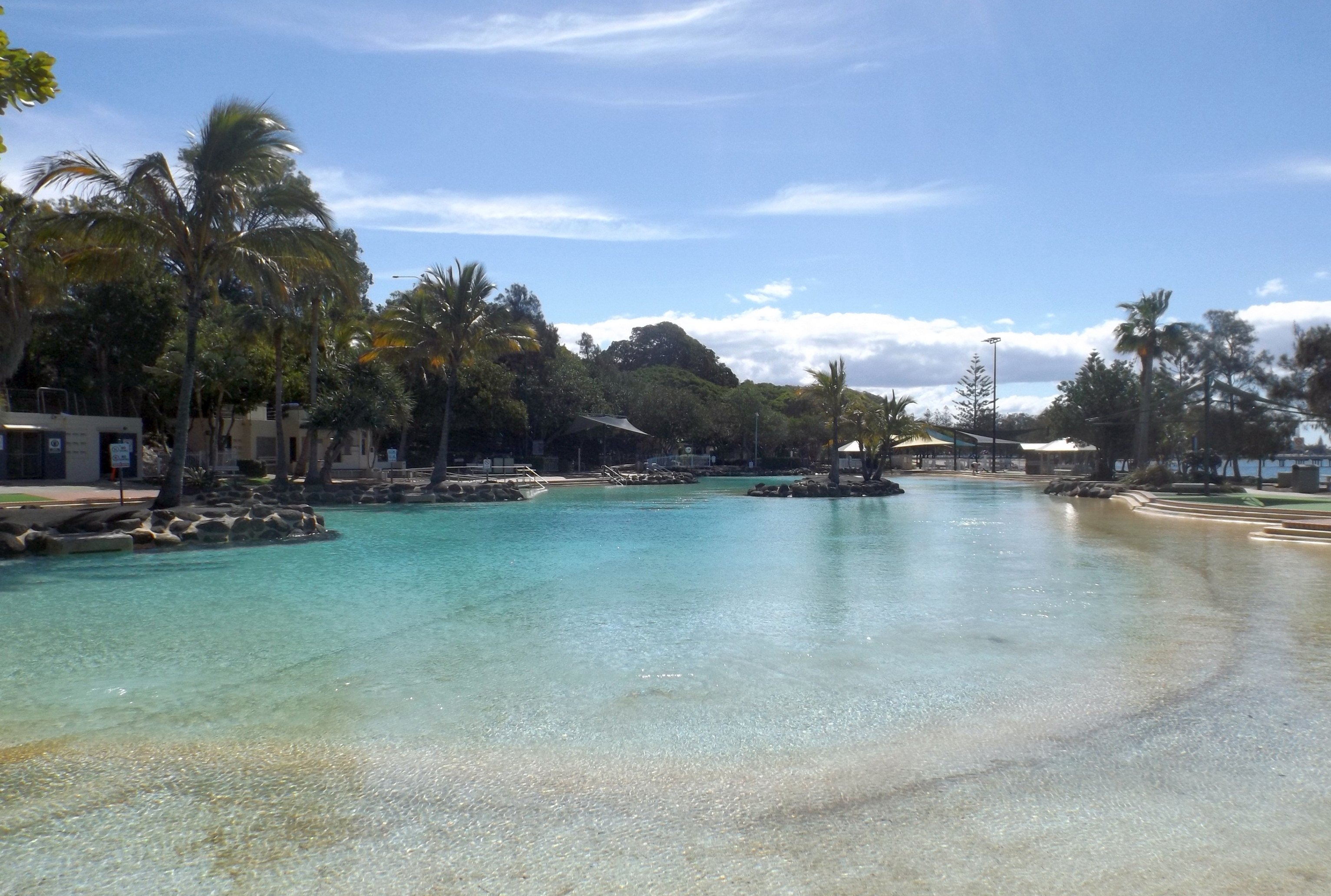
Settlement Cove Lagoon, 2016

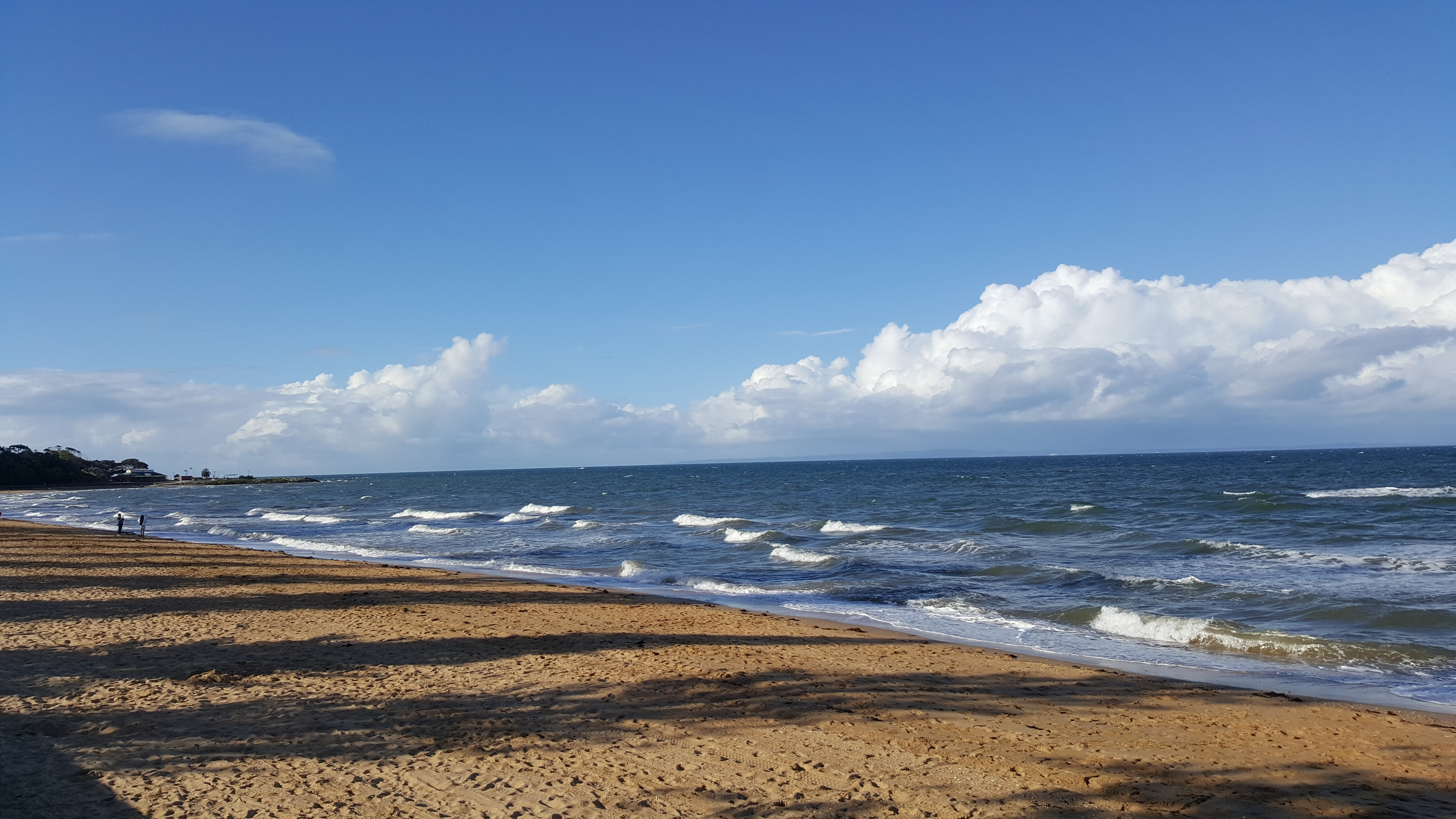
Suttons Beach

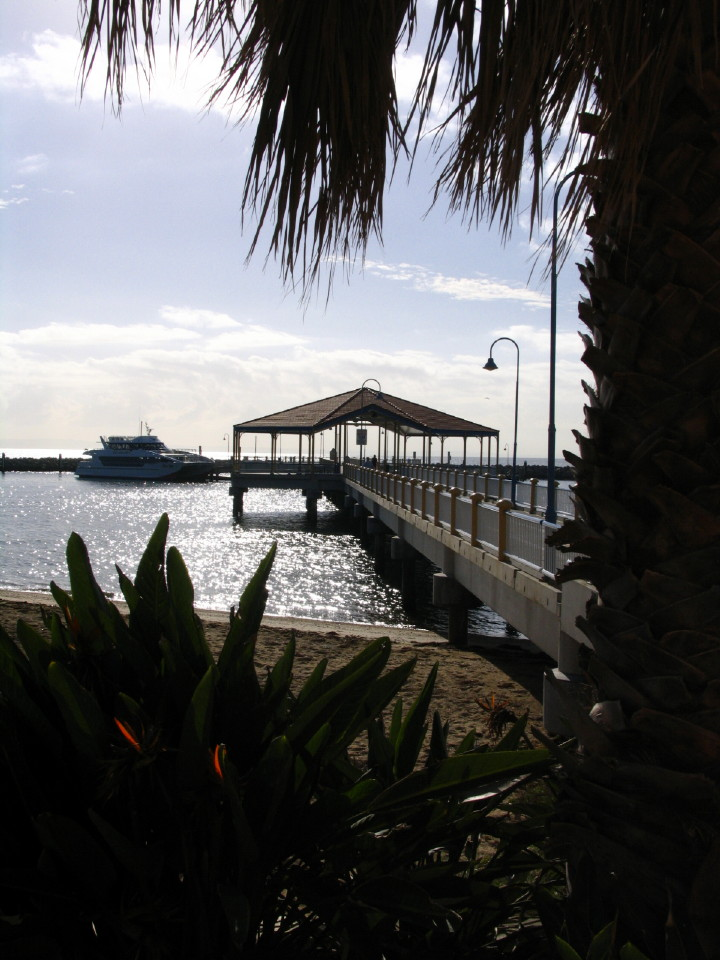
Redcliffe Jetty

Attractions such as Suttons Beach (location of Luna Park Redcliffe (1944 to 1966), Redcliffe Jetty, Settlement Cove Lagoon, Redcliffe Museum, Redcliffe Botanic Gardens, and Redcliffe Showgrounds are all within the suburb of Redcliffe. The entire Redcliffe Parade precinct is home to an abundance of restaurants and eateries. On Sundays, the Redcliffe Markets take place along Redcliffe Parade and in recent years have been a significant event for local businesses with crowds of thousands taking part.

Aside from smaller events, in September each year, Redcliffe celebrates its history as Queensland's first European settlement location with the Redcliffe festival event. This festival is chiefly held in the Redcliffe CBD with Redcliffe Parade being closed off to traffic for most of the day. Other attractions as part of this festival include the KiteFest, The Jetty Fiesta, KiteFest Live, and Spring Break Beach Party with ongoing interest from local community groups and sponsors to create larger and more attractive events each year.

A statue and walkway in honour of the Bee Gees was unveiled by Barry Gibb on 14 February 2013. Barry returned to open the second stage of the walkway on 9 September 2015.

The Moreton Bay City Council operates a public library at 476 Oxley Avenue.

== Sport and recreation ==
A number of well-known sporting teams represent the local area, including the Redcliffe City Cyclones and Peninsula Cricket clubs, Sandgate-Redcliffe Gators, Redcliffe Tigers, Peninsula Power FC, and Redcliffe Padres.

Most notably, the semi-professional Redcliffe Dolphins rugby league team plays in the second-level Queensland Cup state competition. Their spin-off club, the fully-professional Dolphins (NRL), commenced playing in the National Rugby League competition in 2023 under head coach Wayne Bennett. Although the Dolphins play most of their NRL home games at Suncorp Stadium in Brisbane, a few are also played at Kayo Stadium (adjoining Redcliffe Leagues Club), which also serves as a training and administration base.

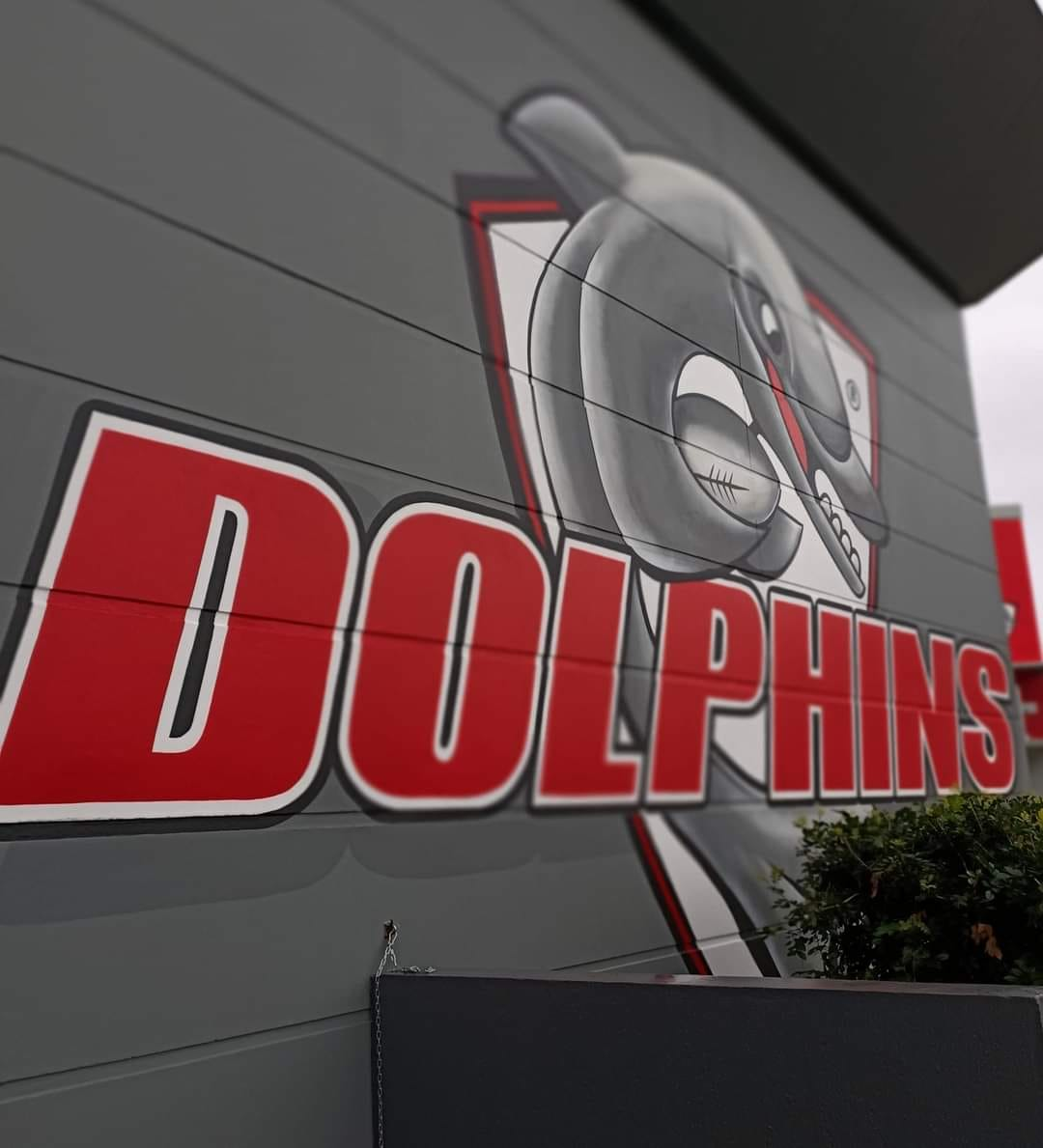
Leagues Club wall

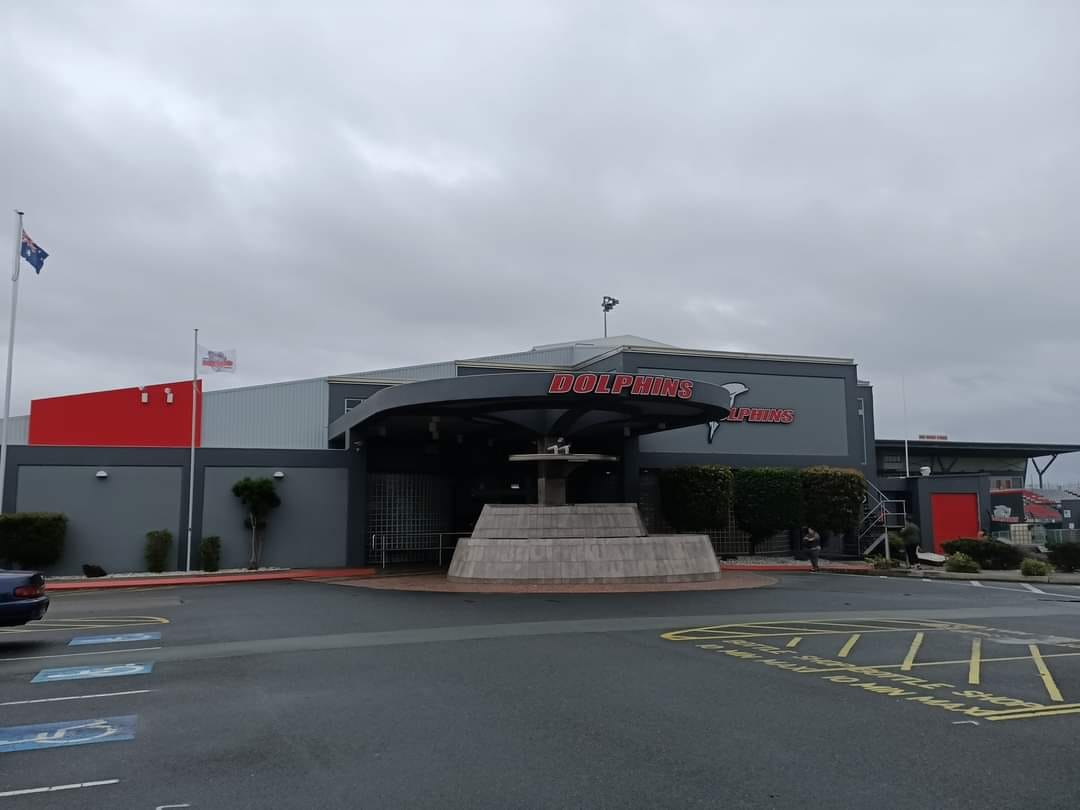
Redcliffe Leagues Club

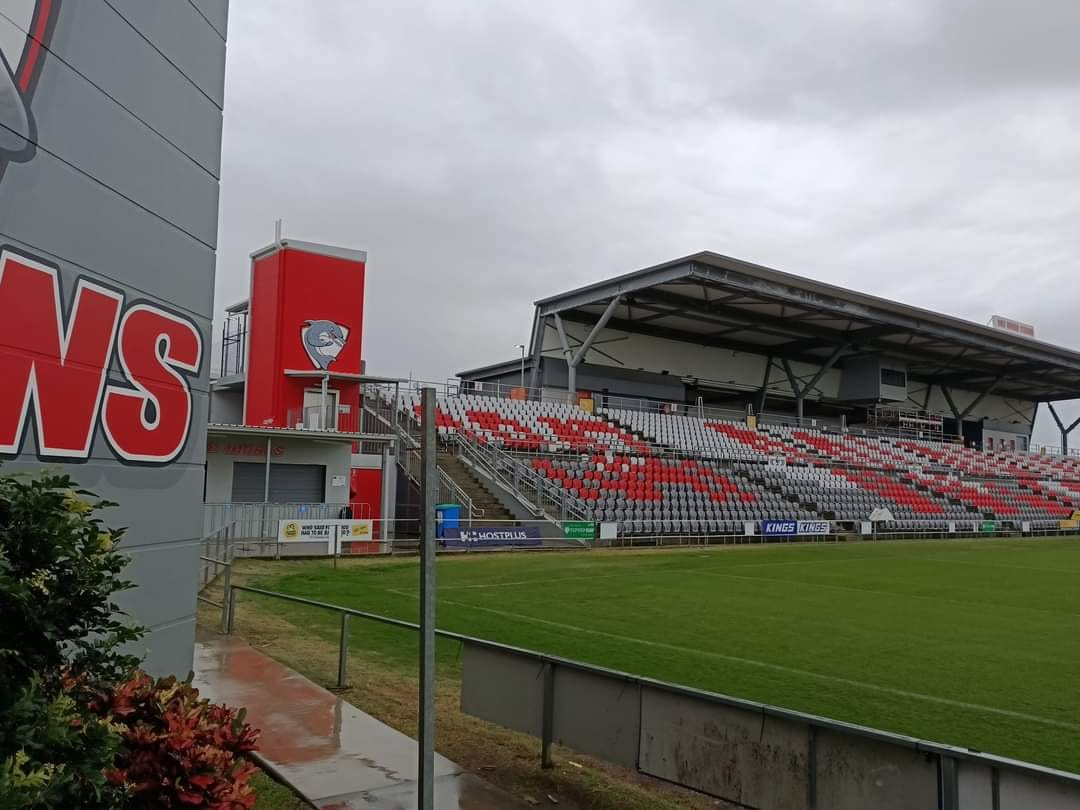
Kayo Stadium

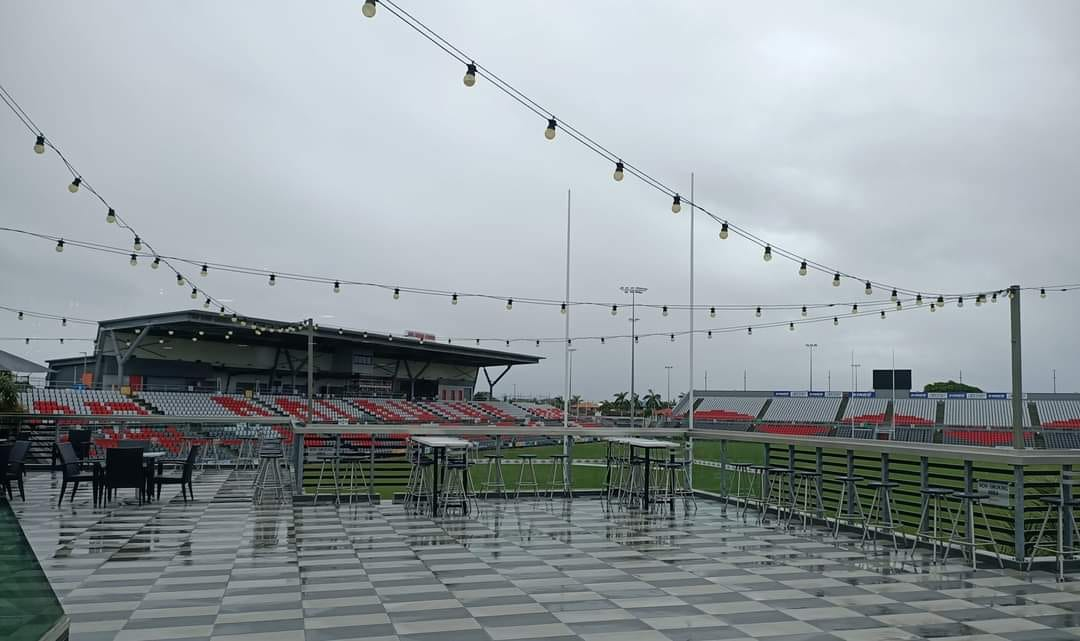
Stadium view from club

Separately, Redcliffe hosts the only harness racing in Queensland that is North of Brisbane at the Redcliffe Harness Racing & Sporting Club.

== Transport ==
Redcliffe is served by a small general aviation airfield, Redcliffe Airport (ICAO: YRED), located 2.5 nautical miles (4.6 km; 2.9 mi) northwest of Redcliffe in the suburb of Rothwell.

Redcliffe is well serviced by public transport operated by Translink with most of the buses connecting to trains at Kippa-Ring station or across the Houghton highway to Sandgate station. Buses also travel to nearby North Lakes and Deception Bay.

In 2016 a train line opened that connects the existing Caboolture line at Petrie to Kippa-Ring station. The line services 6 stations including nearby Rothwell and Mango Hill which is located near North Lakes Westfield and IKEA.

== Climate ==
Climate data for Redcliffe
Month	Jan	Feb	Mar	Apr	May	Jun	Jul	Aug	Sep	Oct	Nov	Dec	Year
Mean daily maximum °C (°F)	29.0 (84.2)	28.5 (83.3)	27.7 (81.9)	25.6 (78.1)	23.3 (73.9)	21.2 (70.2)	20.6 (69.1)	21.4 (70.5)	24.1 (75.4)	25.3 (77.5)	26.6 (79.9)	28.0 (82.4)	25.1 (77.2)
Mean daily minimum °C (°F)	21.9 (71.4)	21.6 (70.9)	20.2 (68.4)	17.7 (63.9)	14.9 (58.8)	11.6 (52.9)	10.6 (51.1)	11.1 (52.0)	14.1 (57.4)	16.5 (61.7)	18.7 (65.7)	20.7 (69.3)	16.6 (61.9)
Average precipitation mm (inches)	111.6 (4.39)	160.9 (6.33)	126.8 (4.99)	124.4 (4.90)	89.0 (3.50)	59.9 (2.36)	51.3 (2.02)	39.7 (1.56)	30.2 (1.19)	70.5 (2.78)	101.6 (4.00)	117.8 (4.64)	1,064.1 (41.89)
Source: Bureau of Meteorology

== See also ==
- Redcliffe Peninsula road network
