= Common Grace (Australia) =

Australian non-denominational movement of Christians

Common Grace is an Australian non-denominational movement of Christians concerned about issues of justice. The organisation started in 2014. As of May 2020, the network has over 45,000 members. The CEO since June 2022 is Gershon Nimbalker.

Common Grace focuses on justice for asylum seekers and Indigenous Australians, for ending domestic violence, and for climate justice and has run successful campaigns on these four issues. It has been called the "largest left-leaning and faith-based political movement in Australia."

== History ==
Common Grace was founded in November 2014. Jarrod McKenna was seconded from World Vision Australia as National Director until the end of 2015. Scott Sanders, also formerly with World Vision, was appointed CEO in 2016.

Wakka Wakka woman Brooke Prentis was the Aboriginal and Torres Strait Islander Spokesperson for Common Grace in a volunteer capacity from 2015, before being appointed CEO in February 2020. She was the first indigenous CEO of a Christian organisation in Australia. Prentis resigned for personal reasons in February 2022. In June 2022, former advocacy coordinator for Baptist World Aid Gershon Nimbalker was appointed as the new CEO.

== Campaigns ==
=== Climate justice ===
In late 2014, Common Grace launched a crowdfunding campaign that raised money for solar panels to be given for the Prime Minister's Sydney residence, Kirribilli House. The Australian Solar Council offered to install the panels at no cost, however the Abbott government rejected the gift, citing the property's heritage listing and security concerns.

In 2016, Common Grace launched a campaign to persuade then Deputy Prime Minister and Agriculture Minister Barnaby Joyce to stop the proposed Shenhua Watermark on the Liverpool Plains, arguing the mine risked Australia's food bowl. In 2019, the organisation supported the School strike for climate, with climate campaigner Jason John arguing students were acting on what they were learning in school.

=== Asylum seekers ===
Common Grace has been active in various campaigns to have refugees released from offshore detention. In 2015, the organisation's then national director, Jarrod McKenna, was one of eight people found guilty of trespassing in the office of Foreign Minister Julie Bishop after staging a peaceful sit-in protest against the detention of children on Nauru. In November 2017, Common Grace organised a day of support for the men held in detention on Manus Island. Alongside World Vision Australia, Common Grace was a driving force behind the #KidsOffNauru campaign which saw the last four children on Nauru resettled in the United States in February 2019.

=== Indigenous Australians ===
Common Grace advocates for justice for Aboriginal and Torres Strait Islanders. In partnership with senior Aboriginal Christian leader Aunty Jean Phillips, the organisation has revived the idea of church services to mark Australia Day. "#Change The Heart" prayer services, seeking to promote acknowledgement and understanding of Australia's First Nations Peoples, are held each year in every state and territory.

=== Domestic violence ===
In 2017, Common Grace launched a resource responding to domestic violence called "Safer".
