= Redcliffe Town Council Chambers =

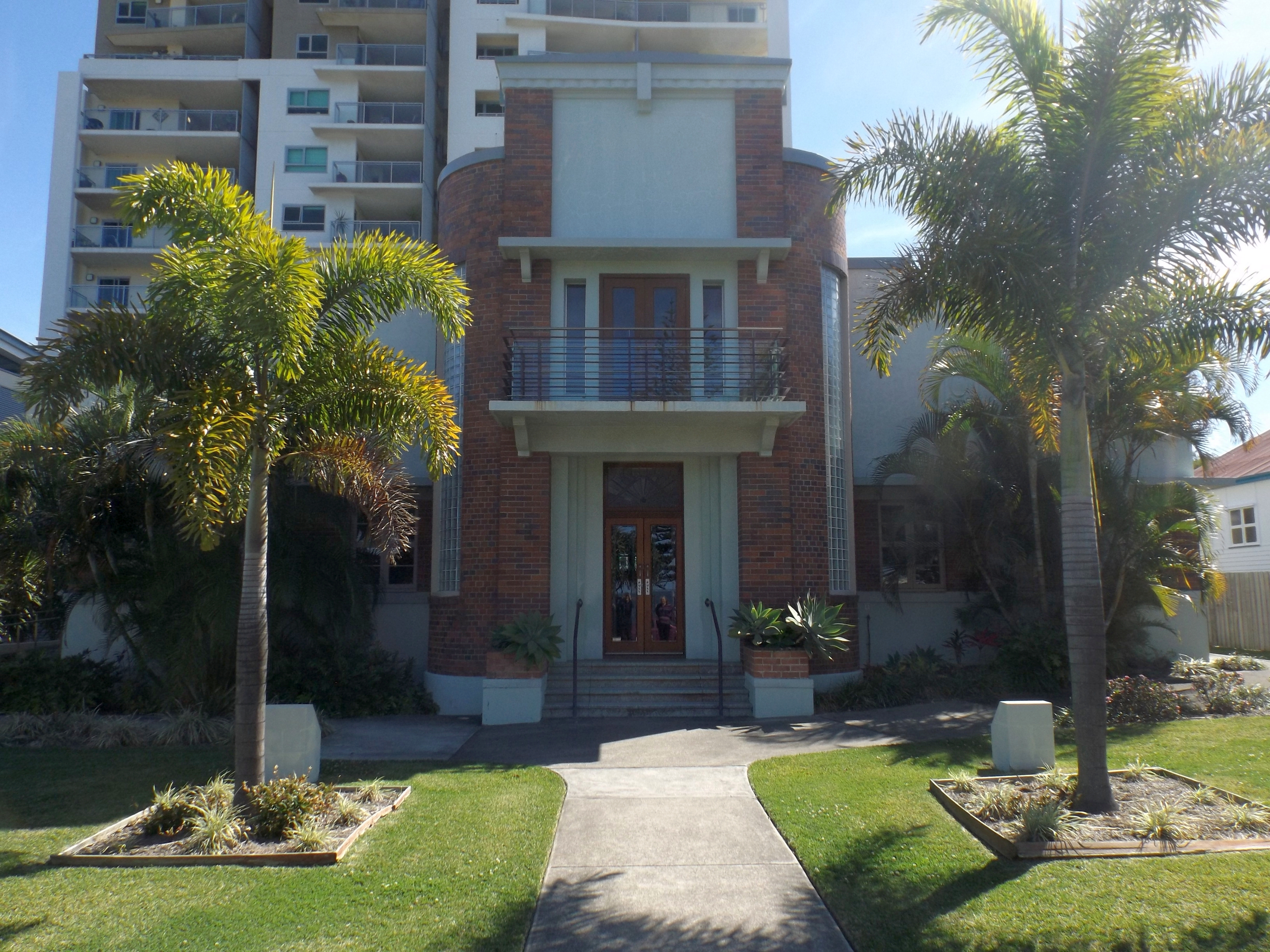
- Building in 2016

- Location within Queensland Location within Australia
- 27.2247°S 153.1141°E
- Location: 185 Redcliffe Parade, Redcliffe, City of Moreton Bay, Queensland, Australia

History
- Design period: 1939–1945 (World War II)
- Built: 1940–1941

Site notes
- Architect: Sidney William Prior
- Architectural style: Functionalism

Queensland Heritage Register
- Official name: Redcliffe Town Council Chambers (former), Redcliffe Community Health Centre
- Type: state heritage (built)
- Designated: 13 January 1995
- Reference no.: 601567
- Significant period: 1940–1972 (historical); 1940–ongoing (social); 1940s (fabric)
- Significant components: views to, council chamber/meeting room, office/s, stained glass window/s
- Builders: Carl Gustav Thiedeke

Redcliffe Town Council Chambers is a heritage-listed town hall at 185 Redcliffe Parade, Redcliffe, City of Moreton Bay, Queensland, Australia. It was designed by Sidney William Prior and built from 1940 to 1941 by Carl Gustav Thiedeke. It is also known as the Redcliffe Shire Hall and the Redcliffe Community Health Centre. It was added to the Queensland Heritage Register on 13 January 1995.

== History ==
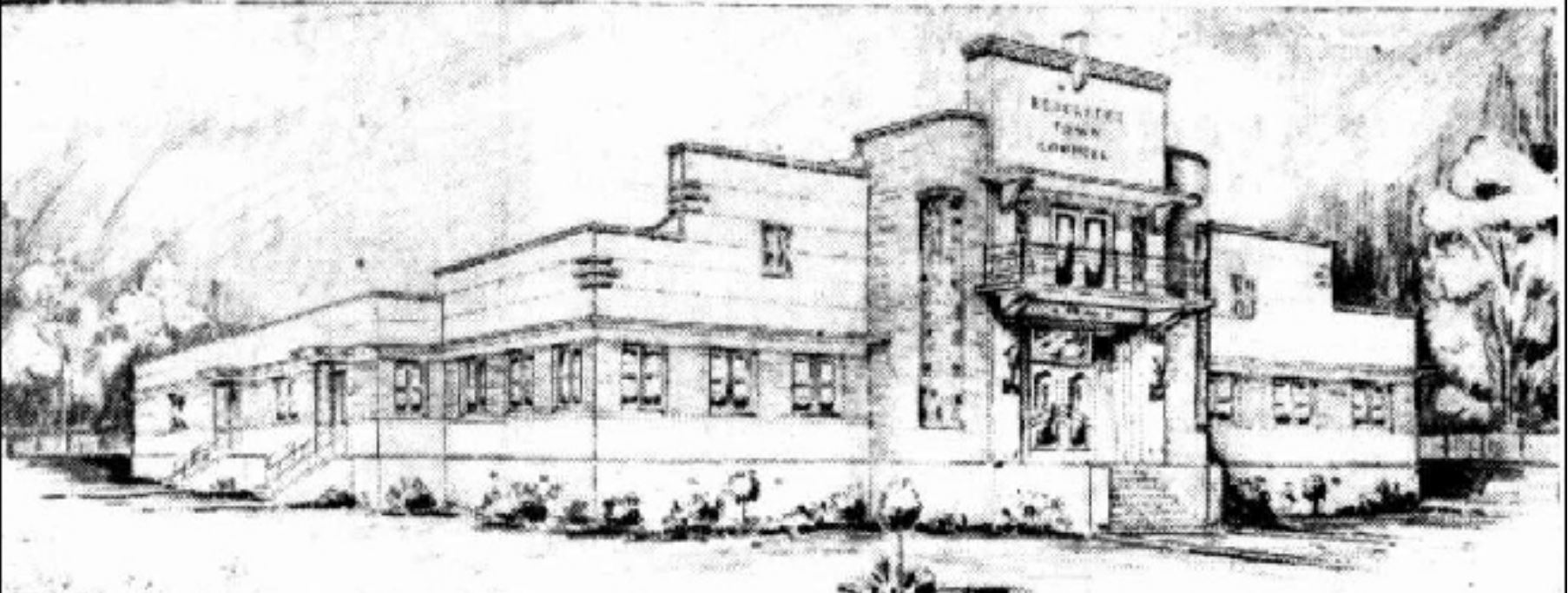
Sketch of proposed Redcliffe Council Chambers, 1940

The former Redcliffe Town Council Chambers was built as the Redcliffe Shire Hall in 1940–1. The building was designed by Sidney William Prior and constructed by Carl Gustav Thiedeke for a cost of £5200. It was built during a key period of development in Redcliffe which followed the construction of the Hornibrook Highway, which linked the Redcliffe Peninsula to Brisbane. The first permanent settlement on the peninsula occurred after land sales in 1862. By the 1870s Humpybong, Redcliffe's popular name, began to make progress as a seaside resort, although lack of transportation and access limited its development as a resort. In the 1880s many blocks were sub-divided into smaller building allotments, leading to increased population in the area. The first local government area, the Redcliffe Division was proclaimed in April 1887, and by this stage the official name Redcliffe was in more common usage. The Divisional Board planned an office in 1892 and a design by Brisbane architect CW Brooke was prepared. However, due to lack of funding the Board moved to the North Pine (Petrie) School of Arts in 1893, and then briefly to the Masonic Hall at Redcliffe in May 1901 and a cottage belonging to Thomas Snook. In 1902 an official Board Office was constructed, designed by Brisbane architect WC Voller. By April 1903 the Divisional Board had become the Redcliffe Shire Council, and then Redcliffe Town Council in May 1921.

During the 1930s the Town Council instigated many improvements in Redcliffe, developing the area as an attractive sea-side resort. The opening of the Hornibrook Highway from Brighton to Redcliffe on 4 October 1935 was a major impetus for development. The Council proceeded with major redevelopment of seaside areas, providing public facilities and undertaking improvement work.

Mention of the new council chambers was made at the council meeting on 13 February 1939, when comments were passed on the dilapidated condition of the existing building. The Council resolved to erect a new building in July 1939, the Mayor at the time being AH Langdon. The old chambers were removed from the site and altered into residential flats, named "Granton".

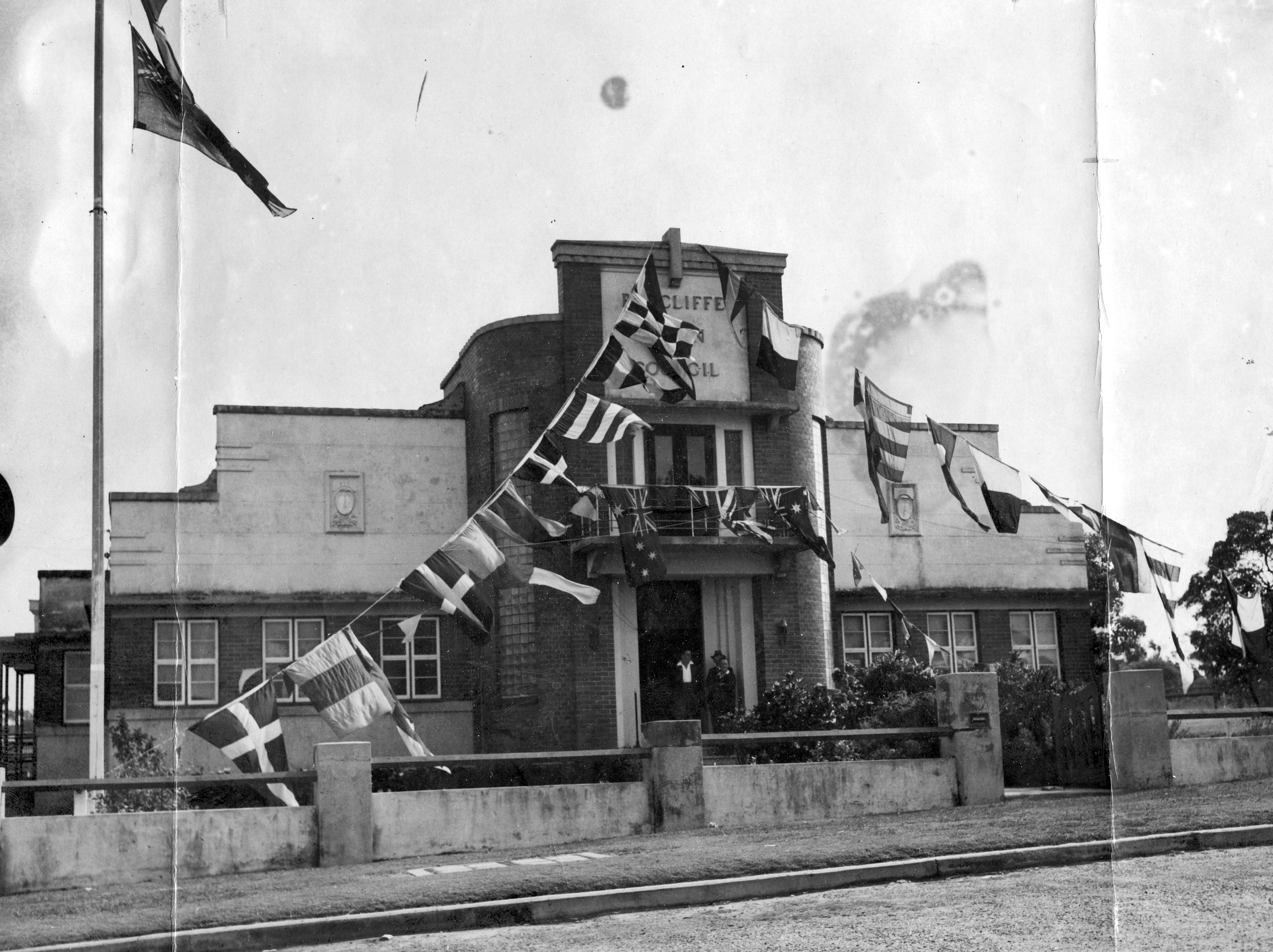
Redcliffe Town Council Chambers, 1949

The new chambers were designed by Sidney William Prior who arrived in Australia from England in 1911 and studied construction and drawing at the Brisbane Central Technical College in 1913 before serving in the First World War. He established his architectural practice in Brisbane in 1923 after having worked for a short period with the Commonwealth Government as a draftsman. A large proportion of Prior's work was domestic though he designed Hesketh House in Elizabeth Street, additions to the Jennings Rubber Company Building in Fortitude Valley and the Bowen Hills Davies Park Speedway.

The chambers were constructed at a cost of £5200, including furnishings, funded by the Council's sale of their electrical undertaking to the City Electric Light Co. Ltd.. The contractor for the building work was CG Thiedeke, whose tender was accepted in August 1940. The building was used to house the chambers of councils along with dental and medical clinics.

The new building was opened on 3 December 1941 by the Minister for Home Affairs, the Hon Edward Michael (Ned) Hanlon. On this same day the minister officially switched on the new Redcliffe water supply.

Redcliffe was proclaimed a city on 11 June 1959, and the Shire Hall, which was inadequate for the expanding council, was given to the control of the State Government Health Department in 1972, for use as a community health centre, when the Council moved to new premises.

== Description ==
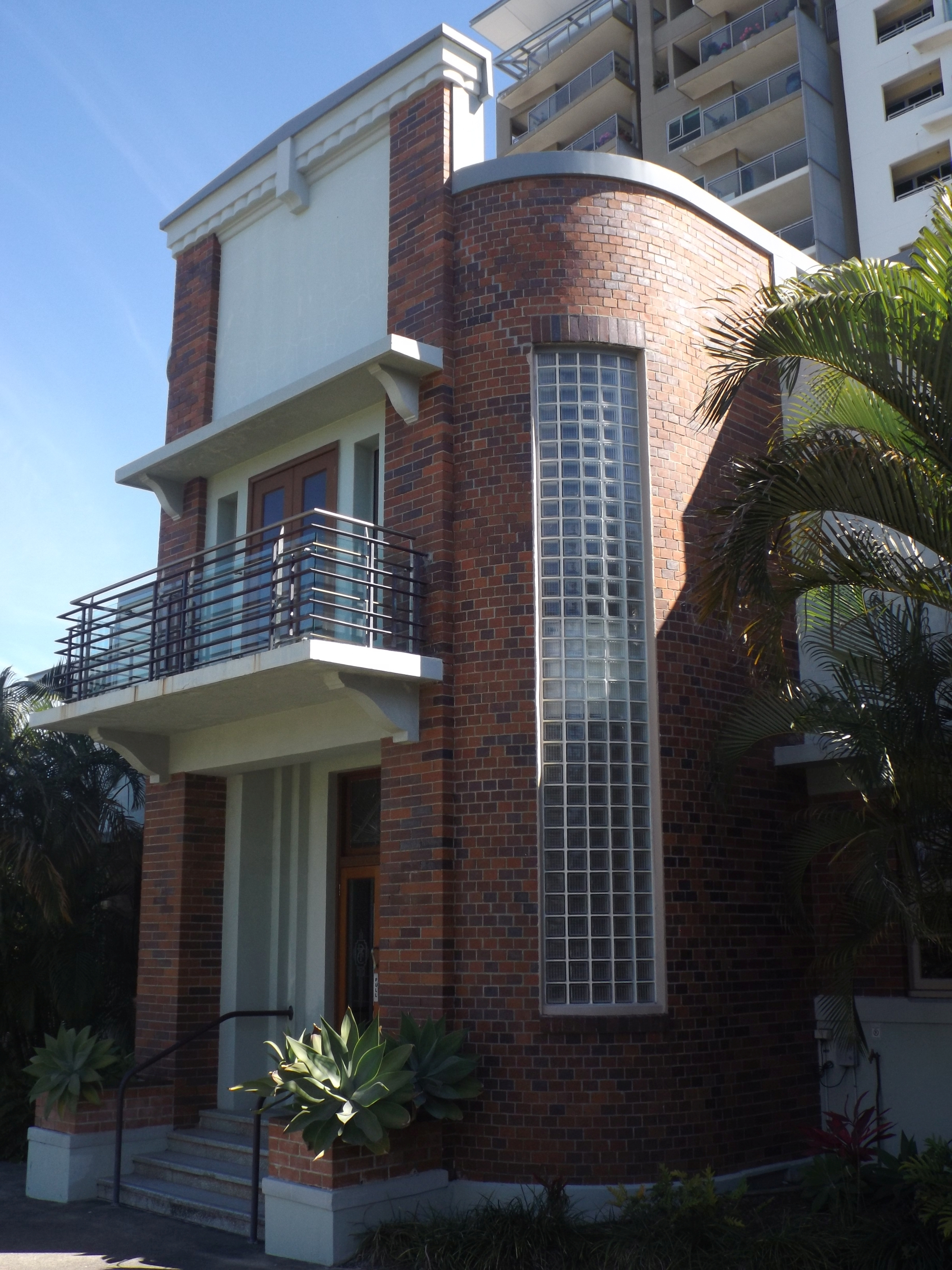
Front of the building, 2016

The former Redcliffe Town Council Chambers is a symmetrical single-storeyed white rendered masonry building with a two-storeyed entrance section. The main facade is curved with stepped parapets which conceal flat roofs. The building incorporates decorative relief shields, glass bricks and stained glass.

The exterior of the building is reasonably intact. Alterations have been made to the interior of the building to adapt it for its present use. The building has been extended at the rear.

== Heritage listing ==
The former Redcliffe Town Council Chambers was listed on the Queensland Heritage Register on 13 January 1995 having satisfied the following criteria.

The place is important in demonstrating the evolution or pattern of Queensland's history.

The Shire Hall was constructed during a time of development at Redcliffe and provides evidence of this key period of growth.

The place is important in demonstrating the principal characteristics of a particular class of cultural places.

The former Redcliffe Town Council Chambers, erected in 1940–1, is significant as an example of a civic building designed in an international modern style which shows the influence of European architectural influence in the late 1930s. The building is an example of the work of Sidney William Prior.

The place has a strong or special association with a particular community or cultural group for social, cultural or spiritual reasons.

The building has a long association with the local community as the civic centre and health care facility.
