= 2017 in Australia =

- Monarch: Elizabeth II
- Governor-General: Sir Peter Cosgrove
- Prime minister: Malcolm Turnbull
- Australian of the Year: Alan Mackay-Sim
- Elections: WA, QLD

The following lists events that happened during 2017 in Australia.

- Decades: 1990s; 2000s; 2010s; 2020s; 2030s
- See also: 2017 in Australian television; 2017 in Australian literature; Other events of 2017; Timeline of Australian history

== Incumbents ==
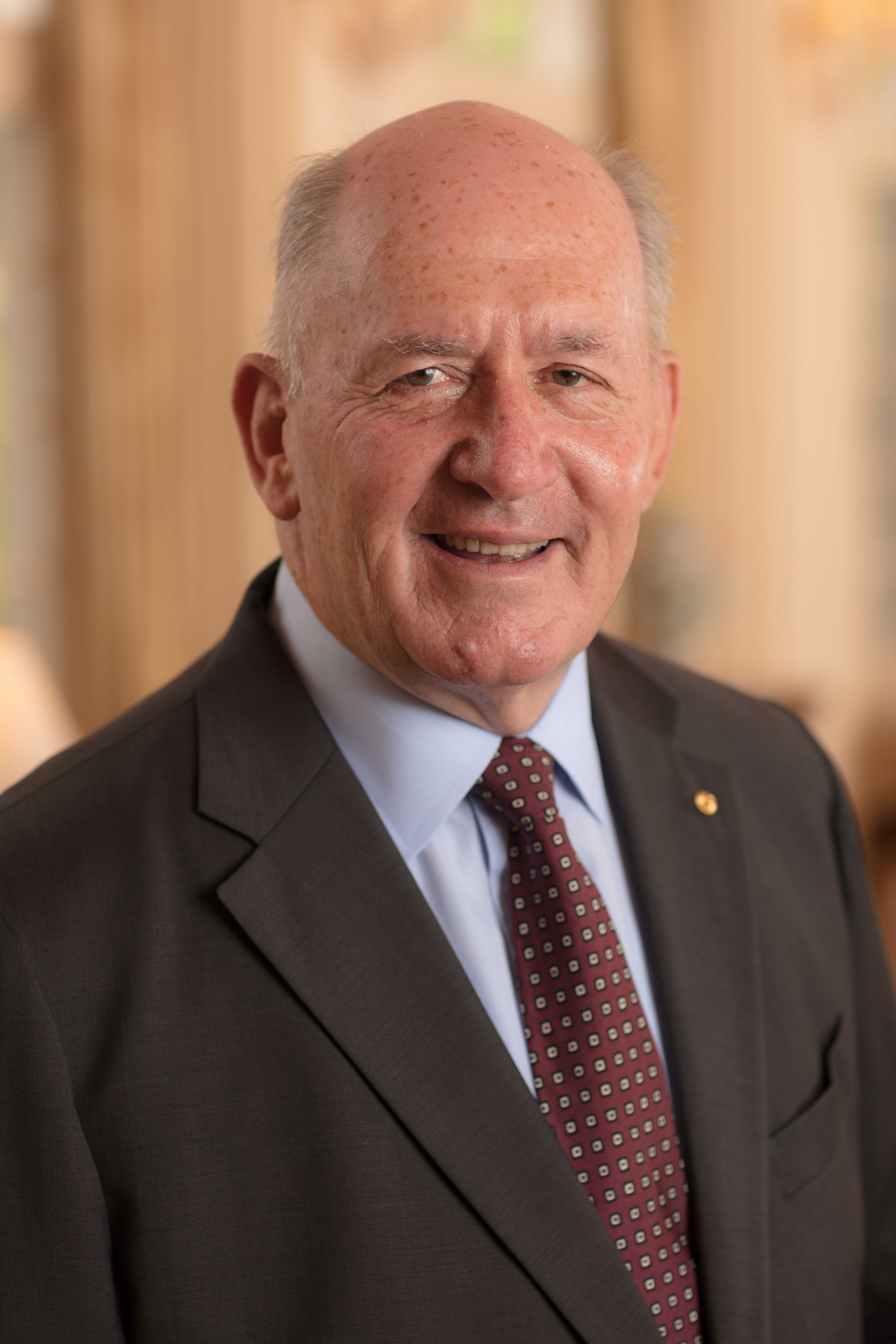
Sir Peter Cosgrove

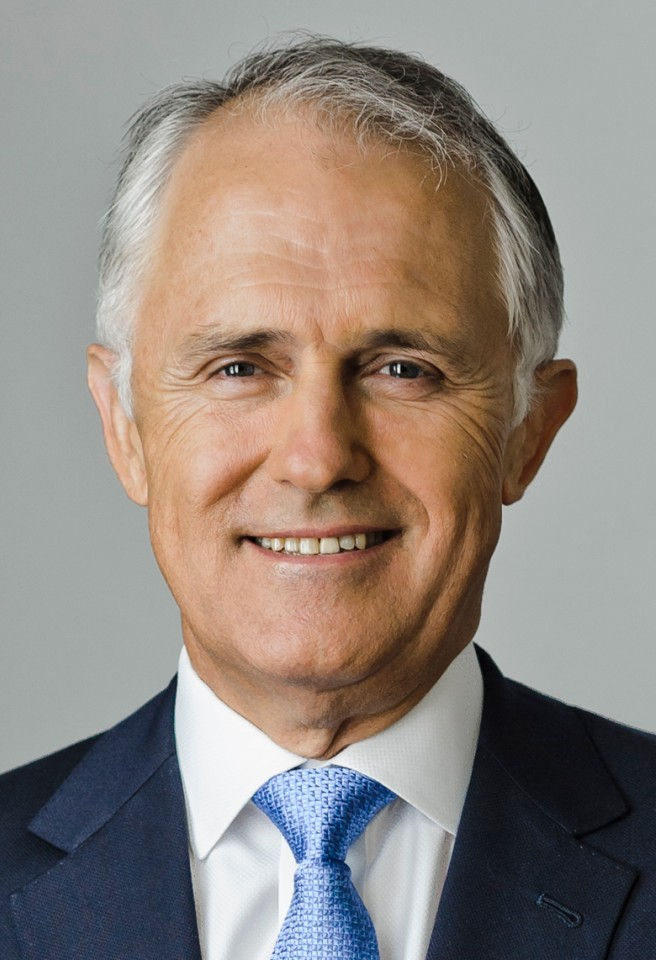
Malcolm Turnbull

- Monarch – Elizabeth II
- Governor-General – Sir Peter Cosgrove
- Prime Minister – Malcolm Turnbull
  - Deputy Prime Minister – Barnaby Joyce (until 27 October; from 6 December)
  - Opposition Leader – Bill Shorten
- Chief Justice – Robert French (until 29 January), then Susan Kiefel

=== State and territory leaders ===
- Premier of New South Wales – Mike Baird (until 23 January), then Gladys Berejiklian
  - Opposition Leader – Luke Foley
- Premier of Queensland – Annastacia Palaszczuk
  - Opposition Leader – Tim Nicholls (until 12 December), then Deb Frecklington
- Premier of South Australia – Jay Weatherill
  - Opposition Leader – Steven Marshall
- Premier of Tasmania – Will Hodgman
  - Opposition Leader – Bryan Green (until 17 March), then Rebecca White
- Premier of Victoria – Daniel Andrews
  - Opposition Leader – Matthew Guy
- Premier of Western Australia – Colin Barnett (until 17 March), then Mark McGowan
  - Opposition Leader – Mark McGowan (until 17 March), then Mike Nahan
- Chief Minister of the Australian Capital Territory – Andrew Barr
  - Opposition Leader – Alistair Coe
- Chief Minister of the Northern Territory – Michael Gunner
  - Opposition Leader – Gary Higgins

=== Governors and administrators ===
- Governor of New South Wales – David Hurley
- Governor of Queensland – Paul de Jersey
- Governor of South Australia – Hieu Van Le
- Governor of Tasmania – Kate Warner
- Governor of Victoria – Linda Dessau
- Governor of Western Australia – Kerry Sanderson
- Administrator of the Australian Indian Ocean Territories – Barry Haase (until 4 October), then Natasha Griggs
- Administrator of Norfolk Island – Gary Hardgrave (until 31 March), then Eric Hutchinson
- Administrator of the Northern Territory – John Hardy (until 30 October), then Vicki O'Halloran

== Events ==
=== January ===
- 1 January –
  - The 15% backpacker tax takes effect, as well as changes to the pension assets test.
  - The National Archives releases the 1992–93 Federal Cabinet papers. The Queensland State Archives releases the 1986 State Cabinet documents under the 30-year embargo rule.
- 2 January–
  - Federal government backbencher Tony Abbott calls for Australia to relocate its embassy in Israel from Tel Aviv to Jerusalem.
- 3 January–
  - Social Services Minister Christian Porter defends the Centrelink debt recovery system and said of 169,000 review letters sent since July, only 0.16 per cent had resulted in complaints.
  - The Victorian Equal Opportunity and Human Rights Commission's website is hacked, purportedly by an international hacking group, sending it offline for several hours.
  - West Australian Labor Leader Mark McGowan outlines a scheme called Target 120, which he promises to implement if Labor wins the March election, to focus on the state's worst young offenders with $22 million to provide comprehensive support to dysfunctional families.
- 4 January –
  - Defence Minister Marise Payne announces that Indonesia has formally suspended all military co-operation with Australia, allegedly over some offensive training material which was on display at an Australian Special Forces base in Perth.
  - West Australian Local government Minister Paul Miles announces that the Shire of Exmouth Council has been suspended for six months following and investigation by the Corruption and Crime Commission (CCC) into alleged corruption and financial mismanagement, with the Local government Minister.
  - The West Australian Opposition promises to axe the $450 million extension of Roe Highway across the Beeliar Wetlands and the entire Perth Freight Link if it wins the state election in March.
  - Tasmanian Premier Will Hodgman admits he had a mobile phone in his hands when he was behind the wheel of a car and says he will voluntarily speak to police about it.
  - Port Augusta residents confront the South Australian Environment Minister Ian Hunter over ash dust which is blanketing the town. Heavy rain in the previous week had caused the ash from the former Port Augusta power station to blow across the area.
- 5 January – The Victorian government announces that it will launch a High Court appeal over an Ombudsman investigation into allegations that Labor MPs rorted their parliamentary entitlements. The Supreme Court of Victoria had earlier ruled that the Ombudsman could investigate allegations MPs misused their taxpayer-funded entitlements by letting paid staffers work in campaign roles in the lead up to the 2014 state election.
- 6 January –
  - The Federal government stops the import of green prawns due to white spot disease.
  - Federal Health Minister Sussan Ley says that her purchase of a $795,000 apartment while on the Gold Coast was "neither planned nor anticipated".
- 7 January –
  - A funeral is held for Josiah Sisson, a 9-year-old boy who was killed by a drunk driver in Springwood on Christmas Day 2016.
- 9 January –
  - Federal Health Minister Sussan Ley stands aside while travel claims are being investigated after further allegations were revealed that she made at least 18 taxpayer funded trips to the Golds Coast during her time as Health Minister.
  - One Nation Leader Pauline Hanson is adamant that she alone made the decision to disendorse the Bundamba candidate Shan Ju Lin after her anti-gay social media post.
  - The Commonwealth Ombudsman agrees to Independent MP Andrew Wilkie's request for an investigation into Centrelink's debt recovery system after widespread criticism of its new automated data matching system which uses information from the Australian Taxation Office and has been producing incorrect debt notices.
- 10 January –
  - The Federal government announces a long-awaited overhaul of MP's travel entitlements.
  - The South Australian government opens a special health clinic at the Port Augusta hospital in response to community health concerns after ash clouds flared up from the old power station. Premier Jay Weatherill concedes that embattled Sustainability, Environment and Conservation Minister Ian Hunter could have shown more empathy to Port Augusta residents instead of politicising the issue.
- 11 January –
  - Claims emerge that Foreign Minister Julie Bishop claimed her attendance at a polo match as an expense.
  - Former One Nation Senator Rod Culleton loses his Senate seat weeks after the Federal Court of Australia declares him bankrupt.
- 12 January – After three years of court hearings and four separate trials, a jury finds Robert Xie guilty of the Lin family murders in July 2009.
- 15 January –
  - Severe storms lash south-east Queensland leaving 1,500 homes without power. The suburb of Chandler in Brisbane records 102 mm. of rain in the space of half an hour. Some suburbs of Brisbane and Ipswich are flooded.
  - Claims emerge that Finance Minister Mathias Cormann made a $23,000 taxpayer funded trip to Broome.
- 16 January –
  - Steven Young defects to One Nation.
  - A car is firebombed over Sydney fish market development plans.
- 17 January –
  - The search for missing flight MH 370 is suspended after searching 170,000 square kilometres of the ocean.
  - The Supreme Court of ACT rejects Julian Knight's bid for an extension of time to bring a case of damages against the Commonwealth. Julian Knight was responsible for the Hoddle Street massacre in 1987.
- 18 January –
  - Greg Hunt is named as new Federal Health Minister as Prime Minister Malcolm Turnbull reshuffles his Cabinet for the fourth time since taking office.
  - Multiple blazes burn out of control across parts of New South Wales, particularly in the Hunter Valley.
  - West Australian Premier Colin Barnett rules out any attempt to ban Muslims from wearing burkas, but says he would prefer "that type of clothing" was not worn in Australia.
- 19 January – New South Wales Premier Mike Baird announces his resignation, after nearly three years in office.
- 20 January – Five people are killed and over 30 injured when a man drives a car into pedestrians on Bourke Street in the Melbourne City Centre.
- 22 January –
  - Victorian Premier Daniel Andrews considers changes to the state's bail laws in the wake of the Bourke Street incident. A new 'night court' will be set up for magistrates to hear bail requests from violent suspects after hours
  - Opponents of forced council mergers protest in Sydney.
- 23 January –
  - Gladys Berejiklian is sworn in as the 45th Premier of New South Wales.
  - A 28-year-old actor is shot and killed in Brisbane, during the filming of a music video for the band Bliss n Eso.
  - The Queensland government winds back its lockout laws. The 1 am lockout will remain but identification scanners will be introduced.
  - Dimitrious Gargasoulas is charged with 5 counts of murder over the Bourke Street attack.
- 25 January –
  - Fifteen detainees escape from the Malmsbury Youth Justice Centre in Victoria. Police eventually re-capture all the escapees.
  - South Australia Opposition Leader Steven Marshall promotes two younger MPs to the frontbench at the expense of long-serving shadow ministers Duncan McFetridge and Steven Griffiths. David Speirs will take on the shadow environment portfolio and Stephan Knoll has been given the police, corrections and emergency services portfolios.
- 26 January –
  - A police officer is injured and one person is arrested after protesters clash with police in Sydney, during demonstrations denouncing Australia Day.
  - Two people are killed (mining engineer Peter Lynch and his girlfriend), and festivities are cancelled, when a light plane crashes into the Swan River, during Australia Day celebrations in Perth.
- 27 January –
  - The District Court of Queensland sentences former Billabong CEO Matthew Perin to 8 years imprisonment for fraud.
  - New South Wales Health Minister Jillian Skinner resigns.
  - The New South government announces the construction of the WestConnex tunnel.
  - The Supreme Court of Queensland sentences a father to 9 years' imprisonment for severe injuries inflicted on a one-month-old girl.
  - The Dow Jones breaks through 20,000 for the first time.
- 28 January –
  - One Nation disendorsed candidate Peter Rogers, who had previously expressed his view that the Port Arthur massacre was a conspiracy.
- 29 January –
  - Prime Minister Malcolm Turnbull announces that US President Donald Trump has confirmed that he will honour the refugee swap deal with Australia as agreed by the Obama administration.
  - The New South Wales Cabinet is reshuffled.
  - The Queensland government announces financial support for a boxing match to be held at Suncorp Stadium on 23 April between boxers Jeff Horn and Manny Pacquiao.
  - Year One students will undergo compulsory testing under a Federal government plan.
- 30 January – Susan Kiefel is sworn in as the 13th Chief Justice of Australia.
- 31 January –
  - The Federal government announces plans to review child care and to cut family tax benefits.
  - Federal Opposition Leader Bill Shorten addresses the National Press Club of Australia outlining the Labor Party's policy of investing in apprenticeships.

=== February ===
- 1 February –
  - Teresa Bradford is found dead at her Pimpama home, having been killed by her husband who had been let out on bail. The case prompts widespread calls for an overhaul of bail laws in Queensland.
  - Prime Minister Malcolm Turnbull addresses the National Press Club of Australia and says the government will focus this year on keeping a lid on household electricity prices. Mr Turnbull also later admits that he donated $1.75 million to the Liberal Party.
  - West Australian Premier Colin Barnett announces an 11 March election date.
  - Police move on a group of homeless people camped outside Flinders Street Station, Melbourne, prompting minor protests.
- 2 February –
  - A report by The Washington Post reported that US President Donald Trump berated Malcolm Turnbull during a phone call which Trump dubbed his "worst call by far". The pair discussed the "dumb" refugee deal between Australia and the Obama administration, before he abruptly ended the call.
  - Clothing retailers Marcs and David Lawrence are placed into voluntary administration.
  - In a landmark decision, the Federal Court finds that a $1.3b Western Australian land use agreement with the Noongar people cannot be registered.
- 6 February –
  - Sapphire Jubilee of Elizabeth II's accession as Queen of Australia
  - Queensland Transport Minister Stirling Hinchliffe resigns. A report by commissioner Phillip Strachan is released and finds that Queensland Rail drivers took an average of 18 months to complete their training – seven months longer than their counterparts in Sydney.
- 7 February –
  - Senator Corey Bernardi quits the Liberal Party of Australia to form a new political party, the Australian Conservatives.
  - The Federal government retreats from a plan to compulsorily acquire land to expand military training in Queensland.
- 8 February –
  - Prime Minister Malcolm Turnbull calls Bill Shorten a "simpering sycophant" due to his past association with the late packaging billionaire Dick Pratt suggesting he drank French champagne while selling out workers.
- 10–12 February –
  - A heat wave in south-eastern Australia results in record breaking temperatures and extensive power loss. High winds on 12 February, spark up to 26 blazes across New South Wales, especially in the Central West and Mid North Coast regions.
  - Heavy rain throughout the South West regions of Western Australia causes widespread flooding. The entire towns of Wagin and Gnowangerup become cut off, and Perth experiences its second wettest day in history, 6 mm short of the record set in 1992.
- 16 February – Police find Olympic gold medalist Grant Hackett in a "disturbed" state of mind, less than twelve hours after he was reported missing on the Gold Coast.
- 17 February – Renegade Federal Nationals MP George Christensen confirms that he drafted a so-called 'letter of demand' to the Prime Minister, but says he never sent it.
- 18 February – Prime Minister Malcolm Turnbull visits Queenstown, New Zealand and rejects calls to exclude the big four banks from the company tax cuts.
- 21 February –
  - Five people are killed when a light plane crashes into the DFO Essendon shopping centre near Essendon Airport.
  - Human remains found at Mount Macedon are identified as those of Karen Ristevski, missing since 29 June 2016. On 13 December 2017 her husband Borce was charged with her murder.
  - Victorian Premier Daniel Andrews rejects the State Coroner's push for a safe injecting room.
- 28 February –
  - A 42-year-old man is arrested in Young, after allegedly trying to help the Islamic State develop laser missile detection equipment, as well as their own missile arsenal.
  - Two members of the Brothers for Life street gang, Farhad and Mumtaz Qaumi, are convicted for the murder of "standover man" Joe Antoun, in his Strathfield home on 16 December 2013.

=== March ===
- 2 March – A man is arrested over a suspicious fire in a Footscray factory, which killed three people the previous night.
- 8 March – Shyam Acharya is charged for using another person's name and medical qualifications to become registered as a doctor in New South Wales for over 11 years. His whereabouts are unknown, but police say he has fled the country.
- 11 March – The Western Australian state election is held. The Labor Party led by Mark McGowan defeats the Liberal government of Colin Barnett.
- 14 March – The South Australian government announces a $550 million plan which will see the construction of Australia's largest grid-connected battery, and a 250MW gas-fired power plant to provide emergency back-up power and system stability services for South Australia. This comes after the controversial statewide blackout in September 2016.
- 28 March – Severe Tropical Cyclone Debbie makes landfall between Airlie Beach and Bowen in north Queensland. Power outages affect over 140,000 properties across Queensland.
- 29 March – The Hazelwood Power Station in Victoria's Latrobe Valley was taken off-line, after first coming into operation in 1964.
- 30 March –
  - Flash flooding as a result of Cyclone Debbie, occurs in much of Southern Queensland and Northern New South Wales. Some 23,000 people are ordered to evacuate near the Logan, Albert, Tweed and Wilson Rivers, the city of Lismore is completely submerged in three-metre high floodwaters, and the Tweed, Byron, Richmond Valley, Kyogle, Ballina, and Rockhampton local government areas are severely affected.
  - The Australian Bureau of Statistics population figures are released, confirming that the population of Greater Sydney has reached 5 million mark.
  - The Australian Senate votes down changes to Section 18C of the Racial Discrimination Act 1975 with 31 voting against (Labor, Greens, Lambie, Nick Xenophon Team) and 28 voting for (Coalition, Derryn Hinch, One Nation, and Liberal Democrat).

=== April ===
- 1–3 April – Ongoing floods in the Northern New South Wales towns of Tweed Heads, Murwillumbah, Gungal and Tumbulgum claim the lives of 9 people, including 3 children.
- 5 April –
  - Australia's largest ever seizure of ice occurs in Melbourne, a record 903 kg of the drug discovered beneath floorboards in a Nunawading property.
  - Former Family First Senator Bob Day who resigned following his re-election in the previous year, was ruled ineligible to run last year following an 'indirect pecuniary interest' with the Commonwealth. The ruling by the High Court meant that a recount of last election's votes would be necessary.
- 7 April – Two teenagers, inspired by terrorists, aged 15 and 16, are arrested after they fatally stabbed one man and injured another, inside a Queanbeyan service station.
- 14 April – After a confrontation earlier in the day, a group of locals and personnel from a nearby military base, storm Australia's Manus Island detention centre in Papua New Guinea.
- 17 April – A 17-year-old girl is killed by a shark while surfing off the coast of Esperance, Western Australia.
- 18 April – Malcolm Turnbull makes a controversial decision to scrap the 457 visa program, citing that Australians should come before overseas workers.
- 26 April – The Family First Party merges with the Australian Conservatives party founded by Senator Cory Bernardi.

=== May ===
- 3 May – Staff at The Sydney Morning Herald, The Age and the Australian Financial Review newspapers begin a seven-day strike, after Fairfax Media announces it will cut 125 editorial jobs.
- 4 May – Malcolm Turnbull meets with U.S. President Donald Trump in New York City, 75 years after the Battle of the Coral Sea. This was their first face-to-face meeting after their infamous phone call in February.
- 7 May – Celebrity chef George Calombaris is charged with common assault after attacking a 19-year-old during the 2017 A-League Grand Final.
- 9 May –
  - Treasurer Scott Morrison announces the 2017 Australian federal budget. The most notable developments included an increase to the Medicare Levy (which will help fund the National Disability Insurance Scheme), a new levy on the Big Four banks, and increased university fees.
  - The Australian Cornish Mining Sites were inscribed on the Australian National Heritage List.
- 19 May – Artefacts inside a Barrow Island cave, provide archaeologists with the earliest known evidence of Aboriginal occupation in Australia, dating back more than 50,000 years ago.
- 28 May – More than 12 years after being arrested on drug charges in Bali, Schapelle Corby arrives back in Australia amid a media circus.
- 29 May –
  - Gregory Keith Davies, 74, pleads guilty to the rape and murder of Kylie Maybury in 1984.
  - Senior Constable Brett Forte was shot and killed at Adare, north of Gatton, after attempting to apprehend a suspected offender. The gunman, Rick Maddison, was shot and killed the next day by police while trying to escape after a siege in a farmhouse at Ringwood, north-west of Gatton
- 30 May – Malaysian Airlines flight MH128 is diverted back to Melbourne after a passenger attempted to breach the cockpit on its way to Kuala Lumpur.

=== June ===
- 2 June – Former NSW Minister for Mineral and Forest Resources Ian Macdonald is sentenced to 10 years in prison for criminal misconduct, for having corruptly issued mining licences at Doyles Creek in the Hunter Valley.
- 3 June – Two Australian women—a 21-year-old from Queensland and a 28-year-old from South Australia—are killed in a terrorist attack in London. Four Australians were also among the 48 injured.
- 5 June – After killing a man, injuring two Victorian Police officers and taking a woman hostage, Yacqub Khayre is shot dead by Victorian Police in the Melbourne suburb of Brighton. ISIS went on to claim responsibility for the siege. Khayre had previously been charged and acquitted for the Holsworthy Barracks terror plot in 2009.
- 6 June – Conservative commentator Andrew Bolt was assaulted in Lygon Street, Melbourne by two masked men, while a third apparently filmed the attack. Bolt was going to the launch of The Art of the Impossible by Steve Kates, an associate professor at the RMIT University. The book is about Donald Trump and the 2016 US presidential election campaign. Melbourne Antifa, appeared to claim a connection in the incident on Facebook, posting that Bolt attacked "some of our family in solidarity.... while they were protesting today".
- 12 June –
  - The 2017 Queen's Birthday Honours are announced by Sir Peter Cosgrove.
  - After a failed bid for the 2022 FIFA World Cup, Football Federation Australia announces a bid for the 2023 FIFA Women's World Cup.
- 14 June –
  - The Australian government agrees to a compensation package for asylum-seekers held at the Manus Regional Processing Centre in Papua New Guinea. The terms of the settlement is reported as $70 million plus costs.
  - Ten Network Holdings goes into voluntary administration, after failing to obtain loan guarantees from its shareholders.
- 15 June – Australian actress Rebel Wilson wins a high-profile defamation case against Bauer Media, claiming they painted her as a serial liar. The trial gained worldwide media attention.
- 19 June – The Australian Defence Force temporarily suspends air combat missions over Syria, after Russia threatened to treat any plane from the US-led coalition as a potential target.
- 27 June – The first full results of the infamous 2016 Australian Census arrive. Religious affiliation hits an all-time low with 29.6% responding to the optional question by stating that they have 'no religion'. This is also the first Australian census wherein over a quarter (26%) of Australians are born overseas.
- 29 June – Victoria Police announces that Cardinal George Pell has been charged with multiple counts of historical sexual assault offences.
- 30 June – Australia's peacekeeping operation, Regional Assistance Mission to Solomon Islands, created in 2003, officially ends.

=== July ===
- 4 July – An investigation by the Guardian Australia reveals the illegal trading of Medicare patient details on the darknet.
- 5 July – Following revelations by the Guardian Australia, the Australian Tax Office temporarily suspends medicare cards as use of proof of identification.
- 7 July – Tesla announces a deal with French energy utility company Neoen to build the world's largest lithium ion battery to store renewable energy in South Australia
- 14 July –
  - Scott Ludlam resigns as a Greens Senator for Western Australia after discovering he holds dual citizenship with New Zealand, making him ineligible for elected office. Ludlam had been a member of Federal Parliament since 2008.
  - Australia's two largest supermarket chains, Woolworths and Coles, announce a nationwide phase out of single-use plastic bags by July 2018.
- 15 July –
  - Two men die in a 'freak parachuting accident' in Wilton, south of Sydney.
  - A US police officer murders Australian woman Justine Damond near her home in Minneapolis, Minnesota after she called 9-1-1 to report a nearby assault. The police officers did not have their body cameras turned on and the reason for the shooting is unclear, prompting protests in the city.
- 18 July – Larissa Waters resigns as a Greens Senator for Queensland after discovering she holds dual citizenship with Canada, and was thus ineligible to be a senator. Waters had been a member of Federal Parliament since 2011, and resigned only four days following the resignation of fellow Greens senator Scott Ludlam – who also resigned for the same reason.
- 26 July – A man is shot dead at Sydney's Central Station following an armed robbery and a subsequent confrontation with police.
- 27 July – Adelaide woman Cassandra Sainsbury is sentenced to serve six years in jail, after she was caught smuggling 5.8 kg of cocaine through Bogota's international airport in April.
- 30 July – Four men in the Sydney suburbs of Surry Hills, Lakemba, Wiley Park and Punchbowl are arrested by Australian police for planning an 'Islamic-inspired' terrorist attack on a plane. Airport security is controversially heightened as a result, with widespread delays occurring over the following days in Sydney International Airport among others.

=== August ===
- 1 August – Universities Australia releases a report which finds 51% of university students were sexually harassed on at least one occasion in 2016.
- 3 August – The Australian Transaction Reports and Analysis Centre files civil proceedings in the Federal Court, alleging that the Commonwealth Bank has committed 53,700 breaches of money laundering and terrorism financing laws.
- 5 August –
  - The United Nations criticises Australian laws stopping same-sex couples who married overseas from getting divorced.
  - Three United States Marines go missing after a mishap involving an MV-22 Osprey aircraft off the coast of Queensland.
- 11 August – Malcolm Turnbull tells 3AW radio station that Australia will invoke the ANZUS treaty in the event North Korea attacks the United States, following increased tensions between the two nations.
- 13 August – Deputy Prime Minister and leader of the Nationals Barnaby Joyce refers himself to the High Court after it is revealed he is a New Zealand citizen.
- 17 August –
  - One Nation leader Pauline Hanson wears the full Islamic dress into Senate Question Time, before calling for the burqa to be banned in Australia. Audible gasps of shock were heard in the parliament. Liberal party Senator and Attorney-General of Australia, George Brandis condemned Hanson's actions.
  - Following a vehicle-ramming attack in Barcelona, Spain, which saw seven-year-old Australian boy Julian Cadman killed, Malcolm Turnbull announces a plan to introduce statues, stairs and bollards around major city centres in counter-terrorism efforts.
  - South Australian senator and leader of the Nick Xenophon Team, Nick Xenophon, refers himself to the High Court after it is revealed he is a British Overseas citizen.
- 25 August – A record number of Australians (approx. 95.3%) are enrolled on the Australian Electoral Commission roll, after enrolments close for the Australian Marriage Law Postal Survey. It is also revealed 90,000 new voters enrolled for the survey.

=== September ===
- 1–2 September – St John's Retirement Village in Wangaratta, Victoria announce that seven residents died in an influenza outbreak in August. The Strathdevon aged care facility in Latrobe, Tasmania announced that six of its residents died from influenza in August.
- 1 September – Australia and Timor-Leste end their maritime boundary dispute in the Timor Sea after conciliation hearings in Copenhagen, Denmark under the auspices of the Permanent Court of Arbitration.
- 5 September – United Patriots Front (UPF) Blair Cottrell, Neil Erikson, and Chris Shortis were found guilty by a magistrate of inciting contempt against Muslims after they had enacted and made a video of a fake beheading, to protest against the building of a mosque in Bendigo. Each was fined $2,000.
- 7 September – The High Court of Australia dismisses two legal challenges to the Australian Marriage Law Postal Survey proposed by the Abbott government.
- 13 September – Unseasonably warm weather and strong winds see bushfires break out across New South Wales. Affected communities include Richmond Vale and Black Hill near Cessnock.

=== October ===
- 3 October – Toyota ceases vehicle production in Australia, closing its Altona manufacturing plant in Melbourne.
- 6 October – The International Campaign to Abolish Nuclear Weapons (ICAN), launched in Melbourne in 2007, wins the Nobel Peace Prize.
- 27 October – The High Court of Australia rules on the 2017 Australian parliamentary eligibility crisis declaring Barnaby Joyce, Fiona Nash and Malcolm Roberts were ineligible for election. Former Senators Larissa Waters and Scott Ludlam were also declared ineligible. The High Court declared Matt Canavan and Nick Xenophon eligible for election.

=== November ===
- 1 November –
  - The Uluṟu-Kata Tjuṯa National Park board votes unanimously to ban climbing of Uluru from October 2019.
  - President of the Senate Stephen Parry announces that the UK Home Office has confirmed he holds British citizenship, and says he will resign from the Senate on 2 November.
- 7 November – A flight instructor is killed and a trainee pilot injured when a helicopter crashes at Hobart Airport.
- 11 November – Liberal MP John Alexander resigns as the member for Bennelong after another dual citizenship revelation, which results in the Turnbull government losing its parliamentary majority.
- 14 November – Senator Jacqui Lambie resigns from the Senate after it is confirmed she holds British citizenship by descent.
- 15 November – The Australian Bureau of Statistics releases the result of the Australian Marriage Law Postal Survey: 7,817,247 'Yes' responses (61.6%), 4,873,987 'No' responses (38.4%).
- 22 November – Senator Skye Kakoschke-Moore resigns from the Senate after it is confirmed she holds British citizenship.
- 25 November – A state election is held in Queensland.
- 30 November – The Turnbull government announces the Royal Commission into Misconduct in the Banking, Superannuation and Financial Services Industry and the following day appoints former High Court Judge Kenneth Hayne, as Royal Commissioner.

=== December ===
- 2 December – Barnaby Joyce wins the New England by-election in a landslide.
- 7 December – The Parliament of Australia passes the Marriage Amendment (Definition and Religious Freedoms) Act 2017, legalising same sex marriage in Australia.
- 8 December – The Australian Labor Party is declared as the winner of the Queensland state election. Tim Nicholls resigns as the leader of the Liberal National Party.
- 13 December – Borce Ristevski is charged with the murder of his wife. Karen Ristevski disappeared from Avondale Heights, Victoria after an argument with her husband. Her remains were found on Mount Macedon on 20 February 2017.
- 15 December – Chief Royal Commissioner, Justice Peter McClellan presents the final report, including recommendations, of the Royal Commission into Institutional Responses to Child Sexual Abuse.
- 17 December – Australian Federal Police arrest naturalised North Korean Chan Han Choi for allegedly violating UN and Australian sanctions by acting as an economic agent for North Korea.
- 21 December – A driver rams pedestrians at the corner of Elizabeth and Flinders Street in Melbourne, killing 1 man and injuring 17 people in the second such attack in Melbourne, this year.
- 31 December – All six people on-board died when a de Havilland Canada DHC-2 Beaver seaplane crashed into Jerusalem Bay off Cowan Creek in Sydney.

== Music, arts and literature ==
- 26 January – Flume's "Never Be like You" tops the Triple J's 2016 Hottest 100, becoming the first electronic song to do so. Flume's single also marked a record-breaking fourth consecutive annual countdown in which the number-one track was by an Australian artist.
- 27 January – The 6th AACTA Awards are held, honouring the best in Australian film, television and documentaries. Biographical war film Hacksaw Ridge, takes out nine awards.
- 27 February – Australian biographical war film Hacksaw Ridge wins the awards for Best Sound Mixing and Best Film Editing at the 89th Academy Awards.
- 18 April – Heather Rose wins the 2017 Stella Prize for her novel The Museum of Modern Love.
- 23 April – Samuel Johnson wins the Gold Logie Award for Best Personality on Australian Television at the Logie Awards of 2017, held at the Crown Palladium in Melbourne.
- 10–14 May – Isaiah Firebrace and Anja Nissen both qualify for the 2017 Eurovision final. This is the first time two Australians have made it to the final, the latter representing Denmark.
- 24 July – The 17th Helpmann Awards for live performance in Australia are held on 24 July 2017 at the Capitol Theatre, Sydney.
- 28 July – Mitch Cairns wins the 2017 Archibald Prize for his portrait of his partner, fellow artist Agatha Gothe-Snape.
- 26 August – the film 3rd Night released.
- 7 September – Josephine Wilson wins the Miles Franklin Award literary prize for her novel Extinctions.

== Sport ==
=== January ===
- 7 January – Tennis: The French team consisting of Richard Gasquet and Kristina Mladenovic, defeat the United States 2–1 in the final of the 2017 Hopman Cup.
- 22 January – Cycling: Richie Porte wins his first Tour Down Under, holding the race lead from the second day onwards.
- 28 January –
  - Cricket: Sydney Sixers defeat Perth Scorchers by seven runs at the WACA Ground in Perth to win Women's Big Bash League 02.
  - Cricket: Perth Scorchers defeat Sydney Sixers by nine wickets at the WACA Ground in Perth to win Big Bash League 06.
  - Tennis: Serena Williams defeats Venus Williams 6–4 6–4 at Melbourne Park in the final of the 2017 Australian Open women's singles.
  - Tennis: John Peers and doubles partner Henri Kontinen defeat Bob and Mike Bryan 7–5 7–5 in the final of the 2017 Australian Open men's doubles.
- 29 January – Tennis: Roger Federer defeats Rafael Nadal 6–4 3–6 6–1 3–6 6–3 at Melbourne Park in the final of the 2017 Australian Open men's singles.

=== February ===
- 3 February – Australian rules football: The first AFL Women's (AFLW) match is held at Ikon Park in Melbourne, with a capacity crowd of 24,500 attending.
- 4 February –
  - Rugby Sevens: Canada defeats the United States 21–17 in the final of the 2017 Sydney Women's Sevens at Allianz Stadium.
  - Rugby Sevens: South Africa defeats England 29–14 in the final of the 2017 Sydney Sevens at Allianz Stadium.
  - Athletics: The inaugural Nitro Athletics meeting is held at Lakeside Stadium in Melbourne. Two more meetings are held on the 9th and 11th before the All-Stars led by Usain Bolt emerge victorious.
- 10 February –
  - Rugby league: The Indigenous All Stars defeat the World All Stars 34–8 in the 2017 All Stars match. Indigenous captain and five-eighth Johnathan Thurston, of the North Queensland Cowboys, wins the Preston Campbell award for Man of the Match.
  - Rugby league: The Indigenous Women All Stars defeat the Women All Stars 14–4 in the 2017 Women All Stars match.
- 11 February – Baseball: The Brisbane Bandits defeat the Melbourne Aces in the Championship Series of the 2016–17 Australian Baseball League at Melbourne Ballpark.
- 12 February – Association football: Melbourne City FC defeated Perth Glory FC 2–0 at Perth Oval to win the 2016–17 W-League grand final.
- 18 February – Netball: The inaugural match of the new National Netball League is held at the State Sports Centre in Sydney between Giants Netball and the New South Wales Swifts.
- 19 February – Rugby league: The World Club Challenge, part of the 2017 World Club Series, is won by Super League XXI champions the Wigan Warriors. They defeat the 2016 NRL Premiers Cronulla-Sutherland Sharks 22–6.

=== March ===
- 5 March – Basketball: The Perth Wildcats win the 2016–17 NBL season, defeating the Illawarra Hawks in a 3–0 clean sweep of the finals.
- 25 March – Australian rules football: The Adelaide Crows win the inaugural AFL Women's grand final, defeating the Brisbane Lions at Carrara Stadium.
- 26 March – Formula One: Sebastian Vettel wins the 2017 Australian Grand Prix, beating Mercedes' Lewis Hamilton and other Mercedes driver Valtteri Bottas.
- 30 March – Cricket: Victoria win the 2016–17 Sheffield Shield after a draw with South Australia in the final at Traeger Park in Alice Springs, their third successive Sheffield Shield title.

=== April ===
- 8 April – Horse racing: Less than an hour after Winx won her 17th straight win in the Queen Elizabeth Stakes, the Sydney Cup is called off midway into the race, the first time in its 155-year history. After crashing into Melbourne Cup placegetter Who Shot Thebarman, former Geelong Cup winner Almoonqith had to be euthanised.
- 12–16 April – Cycling: Australia tops the medal table for the first time in history at the 2017 UCI Track Cycling World Championships held at the Hong Kong Velodrome.
- 15 April – Football: Sydney FC win the 2016–17 A-League season, with 66 points.

=== May ===
- 5 May – Rugby league: Australia defeat New Zealand 30–12 in Canberra, in the annual Anzac Test.
- 7 May – Football: After a 1–1 draw, Sydney FC defeat Melbourne Victory in a 4–2 penalty shootout, to become 2017 A-League champions at Allianz Stadium.
- 31 May – State of Origin: New South Wales defeats Queensland 28–4 at Suncorp Stadium, in the first match of the 2017 State of Origin series. NSW prop Andrew Fifita is awarded man of the match.

=== June ===
- 13 June – Association football: The Socceroos are defeated by Brazil 0–4 during a friendly at the Melbourne Cricket Ground, one week prior to the Socceroos' appearance at the 2017 FIFA Confederations Cup.
- 17 June – Tennis: Seventeen-year-old Australian Alexei Popyrin defeats Nicola Kuhn 7^{7}–5^{5} 6–3 at the 2017 French Open Boys Singles.
  - Netball: Sunshine Coast Lightning defeat Giants Netball 65–48 in the inaugural 2017 National Netball League grand final at the Brisbane Entertainment Centre.
  - Rugby union: The Wallabies are defeated by Scotland 19–24 at Sydney Football Stadium. This marks their second consecutive loss to the Scots on home soil.
- 21 June – State of Origin: Queensland defeats New South Wales 18–16 at ANZ Stadium, in the second game of the 2017 State of Origin series, sending the series to a decisive third round. NSW second-rower Josh Jackson is awarded man of the match.
- 25 June – Rugby union: The Wallabies defeat Italy 40–27 at Suncorp Stadium. Israel Folau becomes the first Australian to score two tries in three consecutive internationals.

=== July ===
- 2 July – Boxing: Australian Jeff Horn defeats Filipino Manny Pacquiao in a unanimous decision by judges at Suncorp Stadium, becoming the WBO Welterweight Champion.
- 12 July – State of Origin: Queensland win the 2017 State of Origin series, defeating New South Wales 22–6 at ANZ Stadium, in the third game. Queensland hooker and captain Cameron Smith is awarded man of the match, while winger Dane Gagai is awarded the Wally Lewis Medal for player of the series.

=== August ===
- 3 August – Cricket: Cricket Australia and the Australian Cricketer's Association have agreed on a new Memorandum of Understanding, thus ending the Australian cricket pay dispute which has threatened to tear the Australian cricket history apart. This also means that the 230 Australian male and female cricketers have been re-contracted and available to play
- 4 August – Association football: The Australian women's football team win the 2017 Tournament of Nations after defeating Brazil 6–1 at the StubHub Center in Carson, California.

=== September ===
- 3 September – Rugby league: Melbourne Storm win the minor premiership following the final main round of the 2017 NRL season. Newcastle Knights finish in last position, claiming their third consecutive wooden spoon.
- 25 September – Australian rules football:: Dustin Martin of Richmond Football Club wins the 2017 Brownlow Medal.
- 27 September – Rugby league:: Cameron Smith of Melbourne Storm wins the 2017 Dally M Medal.
- 30 September – Australian rules football:: Richmond Tigers defeat Adelaide Crows 108–60 to win the 2017 AFL Grand Final.

=== October ===
- 1 October – Rugby league: Melbourne Storm defeat North Queensland Cowboys 34–6 to win the 2017 NRL Grand Final. Storm fullback Billy Slater is awarded the Clive Churchill Medal for Man of the Match. Pre-match entertainment is headlined by American rapper Macklemore.
- 8 October – V8 Supercars: David Reynolds and Luke Youlden driving the Erebus Motorsport Holden VF Commodore win the 2017 Bathurst 1000 in a time of 7:11:45.5456.
- 12 October – Jeff Horn wins the annual Sport Australia Hall of Fame Don Award, the first boxer to do so.
- 21 October – Cricket: Western Australia defeat South Australia by six wickets at Bellerive Oval in Hobart to win the 2017–18 JLT One-Day Cup.

=== November ===
- 7 November – Horse racing: Rekindling wins the 2017 Melbourne Cup.

=== December ===
- 18 December – Cricket: At the WACA in Perth, Australia win the third Test of the five match 2017–18 Ashes series, regaining the Ashes from England.
- 27 December – Yacht racing: Wild Oats XI takes line honours at the 2017 Sydney to Hobart Yacht Race, however an international jury applies a one-hour penalty after a protest is lodged by the crew of Comanche regarding an illegal tacking manoeuvre, resulting in Comanche winning line honours and the race record.

== Deaths ==
=== January ===
- 2 January –
  - Auriel Andrew, 69, musician
  - Richard Gee, 83, Family Court judge
- 3 January – Russ Gorman, 90, politician
- 5 January – Greg Jelks, 55, American-born baseball player
- 9 January –
  - Michael Chamberlain, 72, father of Azaria Chamberlain
  - Russell Trood, 68, politician
- 10 January – Leonard French, 88, glass artist
- 11 January – James Fairfax, 83, company director and philanthropist
- 12 January – Jill Roe, 76, historian
- 15 January – Richard Divall, 70, conductor and musicologist
- 16 January – Peter Jones, 83, Western Australian politician
- 26 January –
  - Fred Parslow, 84, actor
- 28 January –
  - Edgar Britt, 103, jockey
  - Darryl Sutton, 64, Australian rules football player
- 31 January – Paul McBlane, 53, rugby league referee

=== February ===
- 1 February – Sandy Gandhi, 59, comedian and columnist
- 2 February – Paul McBlane, 53, rugby league referee
- 3 February – Lou Rowan, 91, Test cricket umpire
- 4 February –
  - Neil Betts, 90, rugby union player (Queensland, Wallabies)
  - Basil Hetzel, 94, medical researcher
- 6 February –
  - Len Bosman, 93, politician
  - Ritchie Yorke, 73, music journalist
- 17 February – Tony Vinson, 81, social scientist
- 18 February –
  - Lyla Elliott, 82, Western Australian politician
  - Dan Vickerman, 37, rugby union footballer
- 20 February – Eric Smith, 97, artist
- 21 February –
  - Max Angus, 102, artist
  - Joy Hruby, 89, actress and television presenter
- 23 February – Kim Chance, 70, Western Australian politician
- 26 February – Ray Stokes, 92, Australian rules footballer (Richmond) and cricketer

=== March ===
- 5 March – Sydney Ball, 83, artist
- 8 March – Jack Purtell, 95, jockey
- 10 March – Bill Leak, 61, cartoonist
- 11 March – Winifred Piesse, 93, Western Australian politician
- 23 March – Ian Robinson, 91, politician
- 31 March – Mike Hall, 35, British cyclist

=== April ===
- 1 April – Sir Peter Lawler, 96, public servant and diplomat
- 7 April – Peter Isaacson, 96, newspaper proprietor and publisher
- 9 April – John Clarke, 68, satirist
- 10 April – Jack Ahearn, 92, motorcycle road racer
- 12 April – Geoff Grover, 73, Australian rules footballer
- 13 April – Fred Goldsmith, 84, Australian rules footballer
- 19 April – Phil Gray, 69, Queensland politician
- 21 April – Gerry Jones, 84, Queensland Senator and state politician
- 23 April – Mickey Dewar, 61, historian
- 27 April – Robin Millhouse, 87, South Australian politician and judge

=== May ===
- 2 May – Michael Gurr, 55, playwright
- 6 May – Val Jellay, 89, actress, singer and dancer
- 8 May – Lou Richards, 94, Australian rules footballer (Collingwood)
- 11 May – Mark Colvin, 65, journalist and radio presenter
- 15 May –
  - Graeme Barrow, 80, author.
  - Al Lawrence, 86, long-distance runner, Olympic bronze medalist (1956).
- 31 May –
  - Lyn James, 87, television actress
  - Margaret Ray, 83, Victorian politician
  - Kathy Smith, politician, member of the New South Wales Legislative Assembly for Gosford (2015–2017).

=== June ===
- 3 June – John K. Watts, 80, Australian rules footballer and broadcaster
- 6 June – Bruce McMaster-Smith, 77, Australian rules footballer
- 8 June – Jill Singer, 60, journalist and broadcaster
- 11 June – Elaine Schreiber, 78, Paralympic athlete
- 21 June – Con Sciacca, 70, politician
- 24 June – Paul Fitzgerald, 94, portrait painter
- 25 June - Lorna McDonald, 100, historian and author
- 26 June – Jimmy Chi, 69, playwright and composer
- 28 June – Wally O'Connell, 94, rugby league footballer and coach
- 29 June – John Monckton, 78, Olympic swimmer
- 30 June – Colin Hughes, 87, political scientist and academic

=== July ===
- 2 July – Fay Zwicky, 83, poet
- 18 July –
  - Grand Armee, 18, racehorse
  - Val Jeffery, 82, politician
- 19 July – Graham Wood, 45, jazz pianist
- 21 July –
  - Yami Lester, 75, activist
  - Geoff Mack, 94, singer-songwriter
- 22 July – Peter Doohan, 56, tennis player
- 23 July –
  - Reginald Arnold, 92, cyclist
  - Mervyn Rose, 87, tennis player
- 25 July – Geoffrey Gurrumul Yunupingu, 46, musician
- 31 July –
  - Max Day, 101, environmental scientist
  - Les Murray, 71, broadcaster

=== August ===
- 5 August – Patricia Bridges, 95, golfer
- 6 August – Betty Cuthbert, 79, athlete
- 8 August –
  - Rosemary Balmford, 83, judge
  - Janet Seidel, 62, jazz vocalist and pianist
- 9 August –
  - Patricia Giles, 88, politician
  - Johno Johnson, 87, New South Wales politician
- 13 August – Harry Beitzel, 90, Australian football umpire and broadcaster
- 15 August –
  - Brian Gibson, 80, Tasmanian senator
  - Stephen Wooldridge, 39, Olympic cycling gold medallist
- 19 August – Gary O'Callaghan, 83, radio personality
- 20 August – Gary West, track cyclist
- 23 August – Fiona Richardson, 50, Victorian politician
- 24 August – Doug Everingham, 94, politician, Minister in Whitlam government
- 25 August – Drew Morphett, 69, sports broadcaster
- 28 August – Dean Mercer, 47, surf lifesaver
- 30 August – Alan Cassell, 85, actor
- 31 August –
  - John Bourchier, 87, politician
  - Mike Cockerill, 56, soccer journalist.

=== September ===
- 6 September – Peter Luck, 73, journalist and author
- 8 September – Connie Johnson, 40, charity worker
- 17 September –
  - Bob Holland, 70, cricketer
  - Mary, Lady Fairfax, 95, philanthropist
- 21 September – Evelyn Scott, 81, activist and educator
- 25 September – Peter Lewis, 75, politician, Speaker of the South Australian House of Assembly

=== October ===
- 3 October – Jack Laver, 100, cricketer
- 4 October – Keith Schmidt, 95, cricketer
- 16 October – Iain Shedden, 60, musician and journalist
- 20 October – Judith McGrath, 70, actress
- 22 October – George Young, 70, musician, songwriter, and record producer
- 27 October – David Reid, 84, politician
- 29 October –
  - Tony Madigan, 87, boxer and rugby union player (died in France)
  - Sir Ninian Stephen, 94, Governor-General of Australia
- 31 October – Weston Bate, 93, historian

=== November ===
- 4 November – Dudley Simpson, 95, composer (Doctor Who)
- 9 November – Rob Astbury, 69, sports journalist
- 16 November – Wal Fife, 88, politician
- 18 November –
  - Gillian Rolton, 61, equestrian
  - Malcolm Young, 64, musician and songwriter
- 20 November – Jean Hearn, 96, Tasmanian Senator
- 23 November – Joe Schipp, 85, New South Wales state politician
- 24 November – Steve Hutchins, 61, New South Wales Senator
- 25 November – Steve Doszpot, 69, ACT politician
- 28 November – Clarrie Millar, 92, politician
- 29 November – Sol Bellear, 66, Aboriginal rights activist

=== December ===
- 1 December – Ken Inglis, 88, historian
- 5 December – Laurie Rymer, 83, Australian rules football player
- 8 December – Alexander Taransky, 76, sporting shooter
- 10 December – Alex Mendelssohn, 82, outback artist and opal miner
- 13 December –
  - John Joseph Gerry, 90, Roman Catholic bishop
  - Rory O'Donoghue, 68, actor and musician
  - Charles Zentai, 96, alleged war criminal
- 17 December –
  - Dave Boyd, 89, Australian rules football player
  - Frank Hodgkin, 76, Australian rules football player
  - Bunty Thompson, 92, equestrian rider
  - Pat Devery, 95, rugby league footballer, and coach (died in the United States)
- 18 December – Barry Cohen, 83, politician
- 20 December –
  - Florence Bjelke-Petersen, 97, politician
  - Stan Pilecki, 70, rugby union player
- 21 December –
  - Ken Catchpole, 79, rugby union player
  - Bob Moses, 77, rugby league player
- 22 December –
  - Ken Hands, 91, Australian rules football player
  - Jason Lowndes, 23, cyclist
- 25 December – Ken Feltscheer, 102, Australian rules footballer
- 31 December – Richard Cousins, 58, British businessman

== See also ==
- List of Australian films of 2017
