= 2017 in Australian television =

This is a list of Australian television-related events, debuts, finales, and cancellations that were scheduled to occur in 2017, the 62nd year of continuous operation of television in Australia.

== Events ==
=== January ===
Date	Event	Source
1	The ABC's coverage of Sydney New Year's Eve is mostly panned for the fourth consecutive year, described as "dull" and "tedious," with presenters Ella Hooper and Jeremy Fernandez forgetting to start the countdown.	
12	Leaked video of Nine News Now presenter Amber Sherlock goes internationally viral after she insists colleague Julie Snook change to a different coloured outfit ahead of a segment.	
27	It is announced that American soap opera The Bold and the Beautiful will film episodes in Australia.	
29	The Seven Network airs the 2017 Australian Open – Men's singles final recording the highest ratings of a Men's final in 11 years, with 2.67 million metro viewers and 3.62 million total viewers. Channel Seven earned a 54.5% primetime viewing share.	

=== February ===
Date	Event	Source
12	The official 2017 OzTam television ratings period begins	

=== March ===
Date	Event	Source
13	Casey Donovan wins the third season of I'm a Celebrity...Get Me Out of Here!	
23	Justin Milne is appointed new ABC chairman.	

=== April ===
Date	Event	Source
9	A two-week suspension in OzTam television ratings begins for the Easter break.	
23	Official OzTam ratings resume after a two-week non-ratings period over Easter.	
23	The 59th Annual TV Week Logie Awards were held in Melbourne.	

=== August ===
Date	Event	Source
13	The Seven Network claims the television ratings season for the eleventh consecutive year.	
24	MTV Australia and its sister channels, MTV Music, MTV Dance and MTV Classic, suspend broadcasting for a 12-hour period to get the channels' core audience to vote for marriage equality. During the suspension, MTV's test pattern displayed the Moonman holding the pride flag.	
28	CBS Corporation announces its intent to purchase Network Ten, pending approval of the Foreign Investment Review Board. This comes two-and-a-half months after it went into voluntary administration. CBS had already maintained a long-term program and news-sharing agreement with Ten involving its namesake U.S. broadcast network, and was cited as a major creditor for Ten in the administration filing. In conjunction with the purchase, CBS Corporation also announces plans to launch an Australian version of its CBS All Access over-the-top service.	

=== October ===
Date	Event	Source
27	The Seven Network will broadcast the 2017 Rugby League World Cup	

=== December ===
Date	Event	Source
2	The last day of the official 2017 OzTam television ratings period.	
11	SBS announces that established singer Jessica Mauboy, the first indigenous Australian to have a number one in the ARIA Charts, will represent Australia at the 2018 Eurovision Song Contest.	
15	Tim McMillan and Emmy Kubainski are sacked as the newsreaders of Nine's Perth news bulletin.	

== Television channels ==
=== Channel closures ===
- 23 January – Sky News Election Channel
- 28 February – 31 Digital; succeeded by online streaming service Hitchhike TV

=== Renamed channels ===
- 4 December – ABC2 to ABC Comedy

== Premieres ==
=== Domestic series ===
List of domestic television series premieres
Program	Original airdate	Network	Source
Bride & Prejudice	30 January	Seven Network	
Murder Uncovered	8 February	Seven Network	
Newton's Law	9 February	ABC	
The Real Housewives of Sydney	26 February	Arena	
Million Dollar Cold Case	15 March	Seven Network	
Seven Types of Ambiguity	13 April	ABC	
The Aussie Property Flippers	26 April	Seven Network	
True Story with Hamish & Andy	5 June	Nine Network	
Australian Ninja Warrior	9 July	Nine Network	
Yummy Mummies	9 July	Seven Network	
Little Big Shots	27 August	Seven Network	
Blue Water Empire	TBA	ABC	
The A List	TBA	Nine Network	
Cosmetic Coffee	October	Seven Network	

=== International series ===
List of international television series premieres
Program	Original airdate	Network	Country of origin	Source
Revenge Body with Khloé Kardashian	13 January	E!	United States	
Beyond	17 January	FOX8	United States	
Let it Shine	22 January	BBC UKTV	United Kingdom	
Lethal Weapon	29 January	Nine Network	United States	
Rillington Place	8 February	BBC First	United Kingdom	
Legion	9 February	FX	United States	
Detroiters	13 February	The Comedy Channel	United States	
So Cosmo	14 February	E!	United States	
APB	16 February	FOX8	United States	
On Thin Ice	18 February	BBC Knowledge	United Kingdom	
Training Day	26 February	Seven Network	United States	
First Family of Hip Hop	27 February	Arena	United States	
The Moonstone	3 March	BBC First	United Kingdom	
Married to Medicine: Houston	4 March	Arena	United States	
Bull	5 March	Network Ten	United States	
Crime Watch Daily	6 March	FOX8	United States	
The Collection	14 March	BBC First	United Kingdom	
Under Arrest	December	Crime + Investigation	Canada	
Mighty Magiswords	TBA	Cartoon Network	United States	
Trial & Error	TBA	Seven Network	United States	

=== Telemovies and miniseries ===
List of domestic telemovie and miniseries premieres
Program	Original airdate(s)	Network	Source
Hoges: The Paul Hogan Story	12 February	Seven Network	
House of Bond	24 April	Nine Network	

List of international telemovie and miniseries premieres
Program	Original airdate(s)	Network	Country of origin	Source

=== Documentaries ===
List of domestic television documentary premieres
Program	Original airdate(s)	Network	Source

List of international television documentary premieres
Program	Original airdate(s)	Network	Country of origin	Source

=== Specials ===
List of domestic television special premieres
Program	Original airdate(s)	Network(s)	Source

List of international television special premieres
Program	Original airdate(s)	Network(s)	Country of origin	Source
Random and Whacky	4 June	Eleven	Australia	
Fanshaw and Crudnut: Attack Of the Slug Santas	16 December	9Go!	Australia	

== Programming changes ==
=== Changes to network affiliation ===
Criterion for inclusion in the following list is that Australian premiere episodes will air in Australia for the first time on a new channel. This includes when a program is moved from a free-to-air network's primary channel to a digital multi-channel, as well as when a program moves between subscription television channels – provided the preceding criterion is met. Ended television series which change networks for repeat broadcasts are not included in the list.

List of domestic television series which changed network affiliation
Program	Date	New network	Previous network	Source

List of international television programs which changed network affiliation
Program	Date	New network	Previous network	Country of origin	Source
Bottersnikes and Gumbles	25 September	ABC ME	7TWO	United Kingdom	

=== Free-to-air premieres ===
This is a list of programs which made their premiere on Australian free-to-air television that had previously premiered on Australian subscription television. Programs may still air on the original subscription television network.

List of international television programs which premiered on free-to-air television for the first time
Program	Date	Free-to-air network	Subscription network(s)	Country of origin	Source

=== Subscription premieres ===
This is a list of programs which made their debut on Australian subscription television, having previously premiered on Australian free-to-air television. Programs may still air (first or repeat) on the original free-to-air television network.

List of domestic television programs which premiered on subscription television for the first time
Program	Date	Free-to-air network	Subscription network(s)	Source
Long Lost Family	6 March	Network Ten	LifeStyle You	

List of international television programs which premiered on subscription television for the first time
Program	Date	Free-to-air network	Subscription network(s)	Country of origin	Source
State of Affairs	26 January	Seven Network	Universal Channel	United States	

=== Returning programs ===
Australian produced programs which are returning with a new season after being absent from television from the previous calendar year.

List of returning domestic television series
Program	Return date	Network	Original run	Source
The Biggest Loser	14 March	Network Ten	2006–2015	
Hi-5	15 May	9Go!	1999–2011	

=== Endings ===
List of domestic television series endings
Program	End date	Network	Start date	Source
House Husbands	17 April	Nine Network	2 September 2012	
Love Child	4 July	Nine Network	17 February 2014	

== Celebrity deaths ==
Name	Date	Age	Broadcast notability	Reference section
Auriel Andrew (OAM)	2 January	age 69	Indigenous Australian county music singer, appeared on numerous television shows including The Reg Lindsay show, as well as guest roles on Australian soaps like A Country Practice and Blue Heelers	
Richard Divall (AO, OBE)	13 January	aged 71	Australian conductor, composer, scholar and Knight to Malta, known for his association with the Australian Broadcasting Corporation, as a music director	
Sandy Gandhi	28 January	age 58	Indian Australian comedian and newspaper columnist	
Ritchie Yorke	6 February	age 73,	Music journalist, author, historian and broadcaster, contributed to numerous television documentary films, including John and Yoko's Year of Peace and wrote The Real Patsy Kline	
Joy Hruby (OAM)	21 February	aged 89	Actress, comedian, TV presenter, filmmaker, author and celebrity agent, with a career spanning over 50 years, best known as the hostess and interviewer on show Joys World on Community Television	
Fred Parslow	26 February	aged 84	Australian actor of television, film and theatre, appeared in The Sullivans, best known for film role in Alvin Purple and his long association with the Melbourne Theatre Company	.
Frances Hargreaves	3 March	age 62	South African born Australian actress, best known for serial Number as comedy character of wayward teenager Marilyn McDonald,.	
Chelsea Brown	5 April	aged 74	American-born star, best known for native production comedy Rowan & Martin's Laugh-In, of the latter Australian actress who appeared in Graham Kennedys Blankety Blanks, Number 96 and E Street	
John Clarke	9 April	aged 68	New Zealand-born entertainer, portrayed character Fred Dagg, best known as an actor, comedian, writer and satirist in Australia	
Val Jellay|	8 May	aged 89	Australian actress of stage, television and film best known for roles in The Flying Doctors as Nancy Buckley, also appeared in guest parts in Prisoner and Neighbours as Connie O'Rourke	.
Lou Richards (MBE)	8 May	aged 94	AFL player and coach who transitioned to a successful media career, with appearances on The Footy Show and The Sunday Footy Show	
Lyn James	11 May	aged 87	Welsh-born actress, who started her career in Britain, before emigrating to Australia and becoming best known for her role in serial The Young Doctors an original cast member who featured for the entire series run as receptionist Helen Gordon	
John K. Watts	3 June	aged 80	Australian Rules Footballer, radio and television presenter and personality	
Jill Singer –	8 June	aged 60	Melbourne-based journalist and current affairs personality, hostess of The 7.30 Report and Today Tonight	
Les Murray	31 July	aged 71	Hungarian-born Australian sports broadcaster, known for program The World Game.	
Harry Beitzel	13 August	aged 90	Australian football umpire and broadcaster.	
Drew Morphett	25 August	aged 69	Australian sports broadcaster, from the (ABC).	
Alan Cassell	30 August	(aged 85)	English Australian actor, won Best Actor of the Year for A Day in the Death of Joe Egg. (Special Squad).	
Peter Luck	6 September	aged 73	Australian journalist and television presenter (This Day Tonight)	
Judith McGrath	20 October	aged 70	Actress of theatre and television, best known for her roles in Prisoner as Colleen Powell, A Country Practice as Bernice Hudson, Round the Twist as Matron Cecilia Gribble and All Saints as Von Ryan.	

== See also ==
- 2017 in Australia
- List of Australian films of 2017
