= Preston Mosque =

Mosque in Melbourne, Victoria, Australia

Preston Mosque Umar bin Al-Khattab Mosque
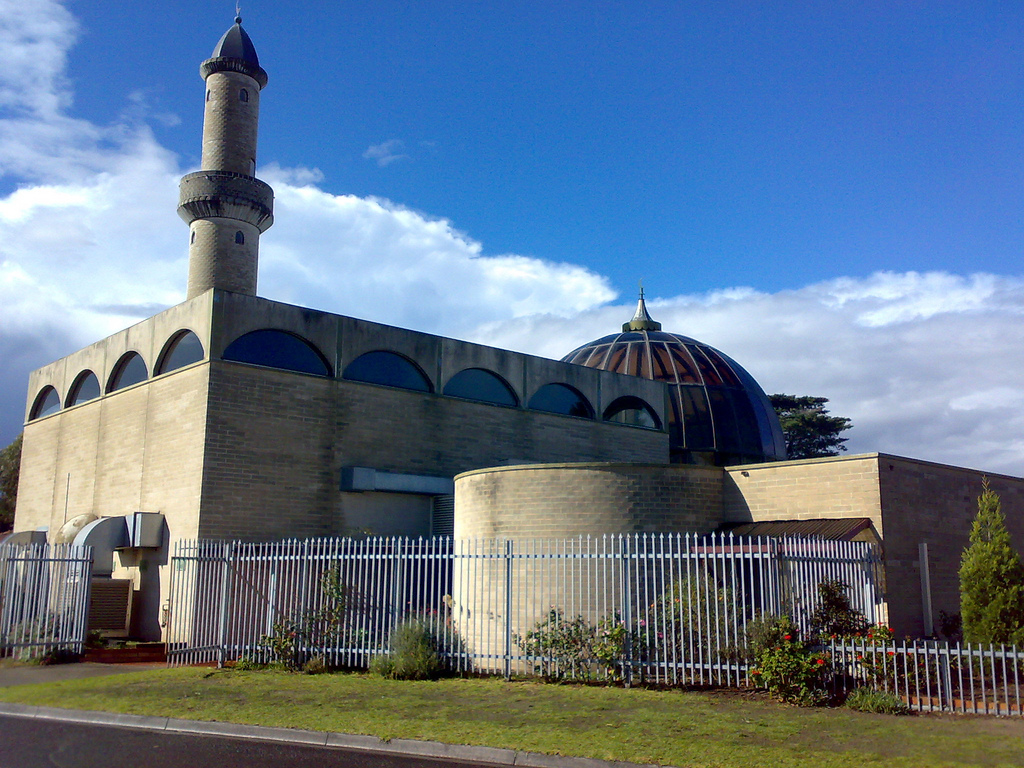

- Location in greater metropolitan Melbourne

Religion
- Affiliation: Sunni Islam
- Ecclesiastical or organisational status: Mosque
- Status: Active

Location
- Location: Preston, Melbourne, Victoria
- Country: Australia
- Coordinates: 37°44′21″S 144°59′35″E

Architecture
- Type: Mosque architecture
- Completed: 1976

Specifications
- Capacity: c. 1,500 worshipers
- Dome: 1
- Minaret: 1

The Preston Mosque, officially the Umar bin Al-Khattab Mosque, is a mosque located in Preston, a suburb of Melbourne, in Victoria, Australia.

The mosque is run by the (co-located) Islamic Society of Victoria Inc (ISV) and, between 2007 and 2011, was the seat of the late Muslim cleric, Sheik Fehmi Naji El-Imam, who was appointed as Grand Mufti of Australia.

== History ==
Before the mosque was built, Muslims would gather at a house that used to be on the property. In 1975 the building began and was completed the following year in 1976. The dome and minaret were added later. Most of it was funded by Bosnian, Arab, Indian and Pakistani immigrants.

=== Background ===
About 800 people pass through the mosque per day over the course of the five daily prayers. For the Friday Congregational Prayer, at least 1000 worshipers will attend, and if the Friday falls on a public holiday that number can easily climb to 1500 worshipers.

=== Memorandum of Understanding ===
In 2009, the Darebin City Council signed a Memorandum of Understanding with the Islamic Society of Victoria (ISV). This was the first of its kind in Australia between a mosque and council, and has resulted in a strong and robust relationship between Council and mosque. The focus of the memorandum is that the council and mosque will work together on projects that have benefit to the community. The City of Darebin is home to people from 148 different countries, who speak 105 different languages.

== Mosque personnel ==
After Sheikh Fehmi Naji El Imam died on 24 September 2016, the Sheikh for the Preston Mosque was Mohamad Mahmoud Abou Eid, until his services were annulled.

== Services ==
- Five daily prayers and Friday Congregational Prayers
- Taraweeh (Night) Prayers during Ramadan
- Eid Prayers
- Burial service
- Mosque tours for schools and community groups
- Annual Hajj group
- Bookstore that has a range of authentic books and DVDs in Arabic and English
- An authorised marriage celebrant to officiate marriages
- Qurban / Udhiyah leading up to Eid al-Adha
- International Well projects
- International orphan sponsorship
- Evening Islamic classes
- Female-only classes (during the day)
- Weekend Arabic School

== Controversies ==
In the 1990s supporters of cleric Mohammed Omran engineered an election and amended the Preston mosque's constitution while the imam, Sheikh Fehmi el-Naji, was on the Hajj to Mecca. Supporters of Sheikh Fehmi worked hard over the next decade to regain ground, and by 2005 were claiming that they had achieved an uneasy balance within the congregation.

In 2012, a Preston mosque committee member advised wives to "fulfil the rights" of their husbands, by sharing him with other women. It was reported that this proposal outraged the local Muslim women.

In early 2017, police were called to the mosque following a serious altercation between factions. It was reported the conflict was over financial irregularities at the mosque. Sheikh Mohamad Mahmoud Abou Eid was suspended.

== See also ==
- Australian National Imams Council
- Criticism of Islam
- Gender segregation and Muslims
- Holsworthy Barracks terror plot
- Islam in Australia
- Islamic organisations in Australia
- List of mosques in Australia
