= Abdel Aziem Al-Afifi =

Sheikh Abdel Aziem Al-Afifi
- Arabic: عبد العظيم العفيفي
- Title: Grand Mufti of Australia

Personal life
- Born: Approx. 1970 Egypt
- Died: 11 July 2018 (age: 48) The Northern Hospital, Epping, Melbourne
- Cause of death: Cancer

Religious life
- Religion: Islam
- Denomination: Sunni

Muslim leader
- Period in office: March–July 2018
- Predecessor: Ibrahim Abu Mohamed
- Successor: Ibrahim Abu Mohamed

Abdel Aziem Al-Afifi (Arabic: عبد العظيم العفيفي; ~1971 – 11 July 2018) was an Egyptian-born Australian Sunni Islamic cleric and scholar, who was Grand Mufti of Australia from March 2018 until his death four months later in July.

Al-Afifi was born in Egypt, where he graduated with a degree in Islamic studies and a master's degree in Quranic recitations. He visited Australia in 2000 to conduct a Ramadan sermon, and decided to stay in Melbourne. He was a founding member of the Australian National Imams Council, and served as president of the council for two terms. In March 2018, Ibrahim Abu Mohamed stepped down as Grand Mufti after serving the constitutional maximum of two terms in the role, and Al-Afifi was elected as his replacement.

On 11 July 2018, it was announced that Al-Afifi had died of cancer at The Northern Hospital, Epping, aged 48.

Titles in Islam
Preceded by Ibrahim Abu Mohamed	Grand Mufti of Australia; 2018	Succeeded by Ibrahim Abu Mohamed
