= Ibrahim Abu Mohammed =

Egyptian-born Australian Muslim scholar

Mufti Ibrahim Abu Mohammed (Note: His name is spelled "Ibrahim Abu Mohammed" by SBS News and ABC News, and others. It is also often spelled "Ibrahim Abu Mohamed" by MEMRI and others. and occasionally spelled "Ibrahim Abu Muhammed".)
- Born: Ibrahim; Binufar, Gharbia Governorate, Egypt
- Other name: Mufti Ibrahim Abu Mohamed
- Citizenship: Australian
- Occupation: Grand Mufti
- Era: Contemporary
- Style: Grand Mufti
- Title: Grand Mufti of Australia

Grand Mufti of Australia
- Preceded by: Fehmi Naji
- Succeeded by: Abdel Aziem Al-Afifi
- Title: Mufti

Religious life
- Religion: Islam
- Denomination: Sunni

Muslim leader
- Period in office: 2011–2018; 2018–present

Ibrahim Abu Mohammed (Arabic: إبراهيم أبو محمد) is an Egyptian-born and educated Sunni Islamic scholar and Grand Mufti of Australia from September 2011 to March 2018. He became Grand Mufti again after Afifi's death.

== Personal life ==
Abu Mohammed was born in Binufar, Gharbia Governorate, Egypt. Abu Mohammed studied at the Al-Azhar University in Cairo, where he received his doctorate; he taught Islamic studies from 1988 to 1996 in Abu Dhabi, United Arab Emirates. On 18 September 2011, he was appointed Australia's Grand Mufti by the Australian National Imams Council (ANIC), replacing Fehmi Naji, who retired due to poor health.

== Activities ==
After moving to Sydney in 1997, Abu Mohamed founded a radio station soon called Quran Kareem Radio, broadcasting Koranic readings and other religious programs 24 hours a day. The radio station's content is mostly in Arabic; it relies on local donations and advertising for funding. In 2005, Abu Mohamed founded a respite centre for Muslims with special needs, which he still manages.

In 2012, Abu Mohamed visited the Gaza Strip, where he met Hamas leader Ismail Haniyeh and told local news agencies, "I am pleased to stand on the land of jihad to learn from its sons". He is said to support Yusuf al-Qaradawi, who he met in Qatar in April 2013.

Mohamed is member of a Tribunal which resolves disputes using Sharia Law based mediation. These mediation sessions are conducted weekly, from Abu Mohamed's Fairfield office.

== Views ==
Though Abu Mohamed was once described as "a political moderate, [but] religiously orthodox" in a 2011 article in the Sydney Morning Herald, he was found on numerous occasions to promote anti-west and homophobic views sympathetic to radical Islamism while associating with the convicted terrorists.

In 2011, Abu Mohammed said that Sharia laws which call for "freedom, justice and right of speech" correspond with Australian laws.

In response to concerns over the radicalisation of young Muslim men in Australia, Abu Mohamed has stated that he believes that the cause is the spread of "backyard prayer halls," run by self-styled imams preaching extremist ideologies. The solution to radicalisation, according to Abu Mohamed, is for the Muslim community to build more traditional Islamic centres; his long-term vision, along with the ANIC, was to facilitate the building of mosques large enough to accommodate gyms, lecture halls and facilities for women and children. According to Abu Mohamed, the Muslim community's building applications for new mosques are frequently met with rejection from local councils; he argues that existing mosques cannot keep pace with the community's growing needs, leading to increased feelings of isolation, rejection and anger among Muslims.

In his 1993 book An Invitation To Contemplate, he said that non-Muslims wanted their women to walk around, “exposed as a piece of sweet pastry ... devoured by the eyes of men" and he met Islamist terrorist Man Monis during a visit to the Villawood detention centre, along with the leader of radical Islamic group Hizb ut-Tahrir.

Abu Mohamed has defended Islam's "longstanding" anti-gay position here he claimed "no person can ever change", by describing homosexuality and lesbianism as 'sexual perversion' while also blaming low fertility rates in the West on 'loose extramarital sexual conduct'. He said that any attempt to call out these Islamic teachings could lead to radicalisation of Muslims.

== Lobbying ==
In October 2014, Abu Mohamed and the ANIC called for the offence of "advocating terrorism" to be removed from the "Foreign Fighters Bill", currently before the Australian Parliament, saying a cleric could fall foul of the law simply by "advocated the duty of a Muslim to defend his land" or if he referred to stories in the Quran, Bible and Torah in his sermons.

In February 2015, Abu Mohamed said the Australian Government should not ban Hizb ut-Tahrir saying the group is, "actually pro-freedom of speech". Tony Abbott, the Australian Prime Minister at the time, responded by saying the comments were "unhelpful".

In October 2015 he called for the extremists behind the Parramatta shooting to "stop messing with Australia."

After the November 2015 Paris attacks, in a press release by the Australian National Imams Council, Abu Mohamed made some controversial remarks that: "These recent incidents highlight the fact that current strategies to deal with the threat of terrorism are not working. It is therefore imperative that all causative factors such as racism, Islamophobia, curtailing freedoms through securitisation, duplicitous foreign policies and military intervention must be comprehensively addressed". He was later criticised for not directly condemning the Paris attacks. This led to a further statement: "We wish to emphasise it is incorrect to imply that the reference to causative factors provides justification for these acts of terrorism." and "Dr. Ibrahim Abu Mohamed have consistently and unequivocally condemned all forms of terrorist violence."

In December 2015, Abu Mohamed, along with other high-profile imams, issued a new year's message supporting a fatwa condemning Islamic State. In the message they stated that "most Islamic Legal Circles and Fatwa Boards have condemned ISIS", and warned young people to avoid the organisation's propaganda.

Abu Mohamed, in a submission to a federal government inquiry, has called for the Racial Discrimination Act to be updated to include protections against religious vilification. Liberal senator James Paterson, a member of the parliamentary joint committee on human rights said, “Effectively that would mean Australia has a national blasphemy law because criticising someone's religious beliefs in a way that offended them could breach the law".

== Defamation case ==
In April 2016, Abu Mohamed commenced civil proceedings for defamation, against News Corporation for alleged damages relating to the publication of two articles. One was an inaccurate claim that he had neglected to condemn a terrorist attack in Paris, the other was a racist cartoon depicting him as a monkey.

== See also ==
- Australian Federation of Islamic Councils
- Australian National Imams Council
- Human rights in Islamic countries
- Islam in Australia
- Islamic organisations in Australia

== Notes ==
Titles in Islam
Preceded by Fehmi Naji	Grand Mufti of Australia; 2011–2018	Succeeded by Abdel Aziem Al-Afifi
Preceded by Abdel Aziem Al-Afifi	Grand Mufti of Australia; 2018–present	Incumbent
