= Holsworthy Barracks terror plot =

Thwarted terror attack in 2009 in Sydney, Australia

The Holsworthy Barracks terror plot was an Islamist terrorist plot uncovered in August 2009 targeting Holsworthy Barracks—an Australian Army training area located in the outer south-western Sydney suburb of Holsworthy—with automatic weapons. The perpetrators planned to infiltrate the base and shoot as many army personnel and others as possible until they themselves were killed or captured; but they were arrested before they could carry out their plan.

One of the men acquitted in 2009 went on to kill a man and shoot three police officers in June 2017.

== Initial investigation ==
In 2007, the Australian Federal Police (AFP) launched Operation Rochester to investigate reports of Somali-Australians traveling to fight for al-Shabaab against the Ethiopian-backed Transitional Federal Government. That investigation ended because not enough evidence could be gathered to press charges.

In 2009, Operation Neath began as another investigation into domestic support for al-Shabab, with approximately 20 people—including Saney Aweys, Wissam Fattal and Nayef el-Sayed—suspected of assisting the Somali jihadist movement.

The AFP, the Australian Security Intelligence Organisation (ASIO) and the Defence Security Division (DSD) continued monitoring this support network, which had expanded beyond the Somali diaspora in Australia. People of other backgrounds, mainly from Middle Eastern countries who lacked the nationalist element in their motivation were included.

Agents from the AFP, DSD and ASIO task force ran a covert investigation that included gathering Human Intelligence (HUMINT), surveillance and technical surveillance.

== Arrests and trial ==
On 4 August 2009, four men connected with the Somali-based terrorist group al-Shabaab were arrested and charged in association with a terror plot. A fifth man was charged in the following days. Prime Minister Kevin Rudd later said that the federal government had ordered a review of security at all military bases. On 6 August 2009, a Daily Telegraph reporter and photographer were charged with taking a photograph of a defence installation after gaining entry to the military base.

The perpetrators were Saney Edow Aweys, Nayef El Sayed, Yacqub Khayre, Abdirahman Ahmed and Wissam Mahmoud Fattal. All five were identified as having attended the Preston Mosque, in Melbourne's northern suburbs. The mosque is the seat of Australia's leading Muslim cleric, Sheik Fehmi Naji El-Imam. They had later been attending the smaller 8 Blacks prayer hall, a former snooker hall located behind a 7-Eleven store on Boundary Road, which is regarded by authorities as a key hub in Australia's militant Islamist network. All five had been part of the same religious "reading group" at the small mosque.

According to police spokesmen, the suspects had been seeking a Muslim cleric willing to give a fatwa authorising a jihad attack on an Australian military target.

At his arraignment, Wissam Mahmoud Fattal refused to rise for magistrate Peter Reardon, saying that he would not rise to his feet for anyone but Allah. Fattal was led from the courtroom shouting that Australia was killing innocent people in Afghanistan and Iraq and that "you call us terrorists – I've never killed anyone in my life."

During the trial, 26-year-old Saney Edow Aweys of Carlton North was one of the three men applying for bail in the Melbourne Magistrates' Court. He was also charged with aiding the commission of an offence by Walid Osman Mohamed in Somalia and preparing for incursions into Somalia for the purposes of engaging in hostile activities. Federal agent David Kinton told the court Aweys intended to travel to Somalia with two of his children.

== Related events ==
On 9 August 2009, the opposition legal affairs spokesman George Brandis called for al-Shabaab to be listed as a terrorist organisation in Australia; It was listed later that month on 21 August.

Evangelical church reverend Danny Nalliah planned to use the plot as an argument to explain that Christianity should be protected "as the core value of the nation" in his speech titled Is the West being de-Christianised? delivered at the Australian Christian Nation Association Annual National Conference held on 21 November 2009 at the Assyrian Sport and Cultural Club, Fairfield Heights, Sydney.

== Impact ==
As a consequence of this and other incidents, the government of Australia reconsidered its approach to the threat of terrorism and announced that it would release a national security White Paper late in 2009.

An editorial in The Daily Telegraph called attention to the wider problem of terrorism emanating from the "ungoverned," but heavily Islamist territory of Somalia. "If Somali-based terrorist groups can threaten Australia, then there is no limit to what they might do next." 16,000 Somali immigrants live in Australia, and Australian authorities have been worried for some time about the close links some of their number maintain with Islamist and jihadi organisations and ideologies.

== Outcome ==
In December 2011, Justice Betty King sentenced three of the men to 18 years in prison, saying that they should be ashamed for their ingratitude to Australia. She added that Fattal, Aweys and El Sayed were all unrepentant radical Muslims and would remain a threat to the public while they held extremist views. Fattal can be deported on his release from jail, but his co-conspirators are Australian citizens.

Abdirahman Ahmed and Yacqub Khayre were acquitted.

Khayre, who had a long-standing drug addiction, went on committing criminal offences and serving time in prison. Authorities did not associate him with terrorism again until he orchestrated the 2017 Brighton siege, taking a hostage in a serviced apartment complex and murdering the complex clerk. He enticed police to the complex and made references to Islamic terrorist groups before confronting police in a shoot-out and was killed.

== See also ==
- Islamic Courts Union – Somalia
- Islamism
- Money laundering
- Terrorism financing
- Terrorism in Australia
