= Taj El-Din Hilaly =

Egyptian-Australian imam (1941–2023)

- تاج الدين حامد الهلالي
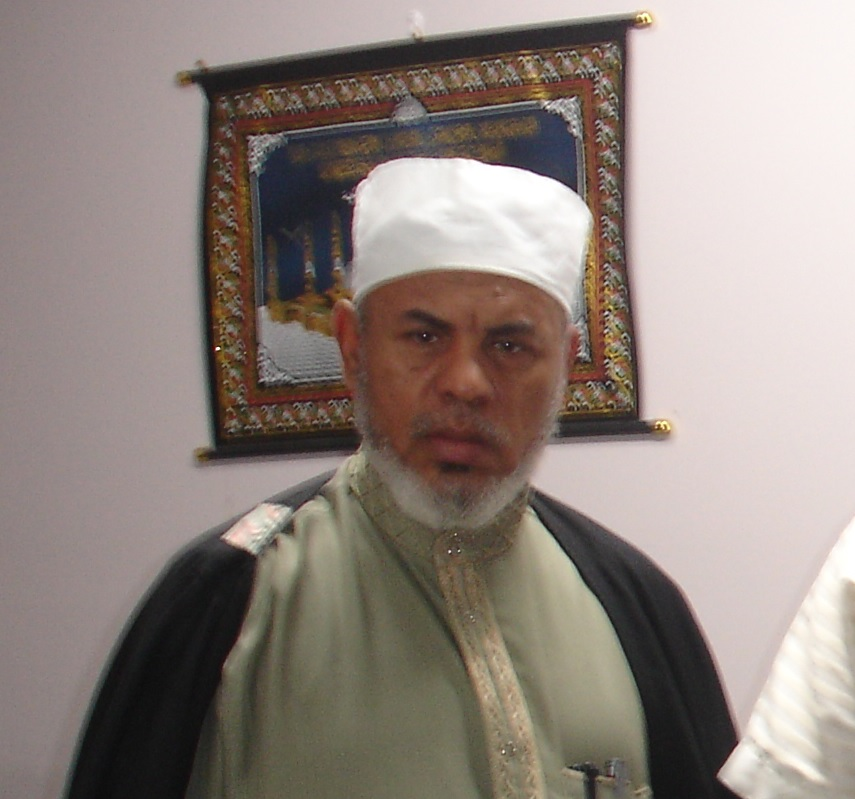
- Hilaly in 2005

Personal life
- Born: Taj El-Din Hamid Hilaly; 17 January 1941 El-Sumta, Egypt
- Died: 5 October 2023 (aged 82) Egypt

Religious life
- Religion: Islam
- School: Sunni

Muslim leader
- Period in office: 1992–2007
- Successor: Fehmi Naji

Taj El-Din Hamid Hilaly (alternatively spelt Tajeddin Hilaly, Hilali, Al-Hilaly, Taj el-Din al-Hilali, Aldin Alhilali, Tajideen El-Hilaly or Tajeddine; 17 January 1941 – 5 October 2023) was an Egyptian Australian imam of Lakemba Mosque in Sydney and a Sunni Muslim leader in Australia. The Australian Federation of Islamic Councils appointed him Mufti of Australia in 1988. He referred to himself as the Grand Mufti of Australia and New Zealand, although this title was not unanimously endorsed, and was also described by some Muslims as honorary, rather than substantial.

Hilaly was a controversial figure and made several controversial statements, as well as having promoted Islamic extremism on many occasions. Hilaly spread many antisemitic conspiracy theories during his lifetime, including claims that Western countries are controlled by Israel and claims that the Holocaust was a "Zionist lie". Hilaly was known for his antisemitic, anti-LGBT, anti-Western and Islamic supremacist views, as well as for his misogynistic statements. After a series of controversial statements on social issues, Hilaly retired from this position in June 2007 and was succeeded by Fehmi Naji.

== Early life ==
Born in Egypt, Hilaly arrived in Australia in 1982 on a tourist visa from Lebanon. Although the visa was temporary, it was routinely reissued until 1988 when then Minister for Immigration Chris Hurford attempted to have Hilaly deported for being against "Australian values". The Islamic community showed strong support for Hilaly to remain in Australia, and Hilaly was eventually granted permanent residence in 1990 by Hurford's successor Gerry Hand.

== Appointment as Imam ==
Hilaly served as Imam at Lakemba Mosque, which is run by the Lebanese Muslim Association. However, his wages were paid by "the Libyan Islamic Call Society and private individuals", according to a former vice-president of the LMA.

== Criminal charges ==
In 1999 Hilaly was charged and jailed after being convicted of being involved in smuggling goods from Egypt to Australia, which he denied.

In early 2003 Hilaly's vehicle was stopped because an object was protruding from it. After closer inspection, New South Wales Police charged him with driving an unregistered and uninsured vehicle, as well as for his behaviour towards the police officers. This incident led to an attack against police officers by nearby Muslims and widespread condemnation from the public. Although charges of assaulting the police officers, hindering the officers, and resisting arrest were later dropped due to police using invalid evidence to justify their suspicion and subsequent search, Hilaly was fined A$400 for the incident.

== Negotiation to free Douglas Wood ==
In May 2005 Australian contractor Douglas Wood was abducted by a militant group calling itself the Shura Council of the Mujahideen of Iraq. They demanded that the Australian government withdraw its troops from Iraq in exchange for Wood. Twice that month, Hilaly traveled to Iraq to negotiate Wood's release, the second time interrupting treatment for a heart condition and returning, at the explicit request of the Australian government, "to Baghdad to deliver an extraordinary offer to Mr Wood's captors, on their behalf." Hilaly said later, "There was a point where the abductors wanted $25 million. Eventually, we managed to convince them to drop this demand and a figure, in the thousands, was agreed." Hilaly also claimed to have spoken to Douglas Wood via telephone, yet after Douglas Wood was rescued following a raid by the Iraqi army, Wood denied ever having spoken to Hilaly.

== 2005 Australian Muslim Achievement Award ==
In July 2005 Hilaly was named "Muslim Man of the Year" for 2005 at the first Australian Muslim Achievement Awards by Mission of Hope (Muslim Community Solutions for Health and Well-being).

== Controversial statements ==
=== 1988 speech regarding Jews ===
Australian Jewish organisations have regularly accused Hilaly of antisemitism, a charge he denied. The charges began in 1988 when Hilaly delivered a lecture to a group of Muslim students at University of Sydney on the topic "The Disposition of Jews in the light of the Qur'an." He was quoted as saying:

The Jews' struggle with humanity is as old as history itself; the present continuing struggle with the Islam nation is a natural continuation of the Jews' enmity towards the human race as a whole. Judaism controls the world by...secret movements as the destructive doctrines and groups, such as communism, libertarianism, Free Masons, Baháʼísm, the Rotary clubs, the nationalistic and racist doctrines. The Jews try to control the world through sex, then sexual perversion, then the promotion of espionage, treason, and economic hoarding.

Hilaly did not apologise nor retract his comments, in which he accused Jews of "causing all wars."

=== February 2004 sermon ===
In February 2004 Hilaly gave a sermon at a mosque in Sidon, Lebanon, whilst overseas the text of which was translated by the Australian Embassy in Beirut. It appeared to show him supporting terrorist attacks. In his sermon, Hilaly said:

Sons of Islam, there is a war of infidels taking place everywhere. The true man is the boy who opposes Israeli tanks with strength and faith. The boy who, despite his mother's objections, goes out to war to become a martyr like his elder brother. The boy who tells his mother: 'Oh mother, don't cry for me if I die. Oh mother, Jihad has been imposed on me and I want to become a martyr'." 11 September is God's work against oppressors. Some of the things that happen in the world cannot be explained; a civilian airplane whose secrets cannot be explained if we ask its pilot who reached his objective without error, who led your steps? Or if we ask the giant that fell, who humiliated you? Or if we ask the President, who made you cry? God is the answer.

— Taj El-Din Hilaly

In his speech, he also predicted that Muslims would control the White House and appeared to support Hezbollah. The Australian Federal Police declined to investigate his activities overseas.

=== 2006 Holocaust denial ===
In July 2006 Hilaly was sacked from Prime Minister of Australia John Howard's Muslim Community Reference Group following comments he made in which he denied the Holocaust, calling it a "Zionist lie". He also referred to Israel as a "cancer". This prompted calls for legal action to be pursued against him in a country which has the highest per-capita number of Holocaust survivors in the world outside Israel.

=== October 2006 sermon ===
==== Comments concerning dress and rape ====
In October 2006, Hilaly delivered a Ramadan sermon in Arabic in which he made statements concerning female clothing which proved highly controversial. The key part of these was:

If you take out uncovered meat and place it outside on the street, or in the garden or in the park, or in the backyard without a cover, and the cats come and eat it ... whose fault is it, the cats' or the uncovered meat? The uncovered meat is the problem. If she was in her room, in her home, in her hijab, no problem would have occurred.

— Taj El-Din Hilaly

Hilaly also said, "in the state of zina, the responsibility falls 90 per cent of the time on the woman. Why? Because she possesses the weapon of enticement (igraa)." Hilaly later claimed that he had intended to suggest that "if a woman who shows herself off, she is to blame...but a man should be able to control himself." He also contended that his references to the prison sentence of Bilal Skaf, the leader of a group of Lebanese Australians who committed gang rapes in Sydney in 2000, in which he said that women would "sway suggestively" before men "and then you get a judge without mercy (rahma) and gives you 65 years", were aimed at illustrating the need for harsh sanctions for rape.

==== Reactions and responses ====
Phong Nguyen, chairman of the Ethnic Communities' Council of Victoria, responded by saying, "Cultural diversity and equality between the sexes in Australia means that women are entitled to dress as they choose and should never be judged on their dress choice." He also commented, "The standard of someone's dress should never be used to justify rape, which is a criminal offence."

Pru Goward, Australia's Sex Discrimination Commissioner, responded during a television interview that "It is incitement to a crime. Young Muslim men who now rape women can cite this in court, can quote this man... their leader in court. It's time we stopped just saying he should apologise. It is time the Islamic community did more than say they were horrified. I think it is time he left."

Keysar Trad, a spokesman for Hilaly, told the Australian Broadcasting Corporation, "From my discussions with him, the issue was not whether they wear a hijab or don't wear a hijab. The issue is that every society has a certain dress code, a normal dress code that people go by. So if somebody goes beyond that dress code, if men or women get to the stage where they dress in a manner that is provocative then these people are doing something wrong. He was not talking about rape."

After such comments were made publicly, on 26 October 2006 Hilaly released a statement. He said, "I unreservedly apologise to any woman who is offended by my comments. I had only intended to protect women's honour, something lost in The Australian presentation of my talk."

The Australian National Imams Council was formed in 2006 during a meeting of more than 80 Imams which had gathered to discuss the crisis created by comments made by Taj El-Din Hilaly.

==== Bikini march ====
In late 2006 Melbourne resident Christine Hawkins organised a bikini rally, in which women were to wear beach clothing and march on Lakemba Mosque and the Islamic Information and Support Centre in Brunswick, Melbourne, to voice their "disgust" at Hilaly's comments. Ultimately, organisers claimed that public reports critical of the demonstration and personal attacks caused them to abandon the event.

=== January 2007 television comments ===
On 8 January 2007, Hilaly appeared on an Egyptian television program. He made a number of comments that sparked criticism in Australia, including the following:

- British and Irish settlers arrived in Australia as convicts. Muslims paid for their own tickets, and so have more right to Australia
- Western people, especially the English race, are the biggest liars and oppressors.

Hilaly also condemned the level of rights awarded to homosexuals in Australia, stating "We have Christian churches which allow people of the same gender to marry" and "I understand the mentality of the West and especially the Australian mentality and I understand that the Australian law guarantees freedoms to the point of insanity."

=== Proposed political movement ===
Following his comments on social and legal issues and in the lead-up to the 2007 Federal election, Hilaly proposed to form a political party to represent Islamic interests in the national Parliament. The party was to have been supported by the political committee of Muslim community elders, also created by Hilaly. The suggested motto was: "With you, from and for you". A party manifesto had originally been drafted in 2001 but the idea was abandoned in the wake of the 11 September terrorist attacks. Hilaly indicated he would register the party with several thousand members by late 2007.

The proposed new party was immediately criticised. Opposition leader Kevin Rudd was quoted as saying "Australians will never vote for a man who denigrates women, defends gang rapists and makes statements when he is in the Middle East denouncing Australia and Australians." Prime Minister John Howard commented "It would be unwise because it would heighten the belief of some in the community that islamic Australians are opposed to integration."

The concept of the Party was abandoned once again in June 2007 when Hilaly retired from his role as Mufti.

== Cleared of alleged links to Hezbollah ==
Allegations surfaced that Hilaly was diverting relief funds intended for the victims of the Israel-Lebanon war to Lebanese Shiite militant group Hezbollah, the military wing of which is classified as a terrorist organisation by the Australian Government. On 10 May 2007 the Australian Federal Police cleared Hilaly of diverting charitable funds to Hezbollah.

== Retirement and death ==
The Council of Islamic Jurisprudence and Research reappointed Hilaly as Grand Mufti on 10 June 2007; however, he declined the position, thereby ending his term in office.

== See also ==
- Islam and antisemitism
