= Defence Security Division =

The Defence Security Division (DSD) (formerly the Defence Security and Vetting Service (DSVS) and the Defence Security Authority (DSA)) is a secret police service and one of the least known security agencies within the Australian Government and plays a crucial role in maintaining national security.

The DSD sits within Australia’s National Intelligence Community (NIC) security architecture as Defence’s principal protective security authority. DSD is responsible for protective security, counterintelligence, and insider‑threat detection and mitigation within the Australian Defence Organisation. DSD is a civilian-military agency with serving Australian Defence Force (ADF) officers and Australian Public Service (APS) officers. DSD primary operates as a security service with federal law enforcement functions. DSD is composed of four specialised branches.

The Assurance, Cybersecurity and Outreach Branch protects the ADO's special missions functions, so they can be performed securely within the Department of Defence.

The Security Threat Assessments Branch (STAB) provides strategic assessments of foreign intelligence risks, emerging security threats, and insider‑risk indicators affecting Defence personnel and facilities.

The Defence Industry Security Branch (DISB) oversees protective security policy, accreditation, and compliance for Defence industry partners, including the management of classified contract security requirements and administers the Defence Industry Security Program (DISP).

The Australian Government Security Vetting Agency (AGSVA) is responsible for conducting personnel security vetting across all Commonwealth agencies and the ADF, operating under DSD’s governance framework and policy oversight.

DSD is compared to the U.S Defense Counterintelligence and Security Agency and Defense Intelligence Agency. DSD employ security and threat analysts, physical security specialists, and security investigators. DSD also employs Special Defence Security Officials (SDSOs), who serve with designated special powers.

DSD SDSOs are unique within the Commonwealth in that they are the only officers authorised to exercise statutory use‑of‑force powers, including lethal force, while operating in plain clothes without displaying any Australian Government insignia. No other state or federal government role provides use‑of‑force authorities to officials who do not wear a uniform or some form of visible identification.

DSD agents are also embedded within the Australian Security Intelligence Organisation (ASIO) for closer collaboration on matters pertaining to Defence-specific espionage and Top Secret Privileged Access security clearances. DSD is the parent agency of the Australian Government Security Vetting Agency.

DSD agents are accredited Australian Government investigators, consistent with their U.S DCSA Special Agent counterparts. DSD agents are required to complete the Diploma of Government (Security) and the Certificate IV in Government (Investigation) or the Diploma of Government (Investigation) through T4-Protective Security.

== Chief Security Officer & First Assistant Secretary, Defence Security ==
The Chief Security Officer (CSO) is the Australian Government's most senior counterintelligence officer, responsible for security across the Australian Defence Organisation. The CSO incumbent is also the 'First Assistant Secretary for Defence Security' (FAS-DS) within the Department of Defence and is head of the Defence Security Division.

The Chief Security Officer is distinct from the Director‑General of Security, where the latter leads ASIO and serves as the Australian Government's most senior security officer. The current CSO is First Assistant Secretary Monique Hamilton PSM.

The CSO and FAS-DS administrates DSD, drawing its authority from the:

- Safeguarding Australia’s Military Secrets Act 2024
- Defence Act 1903 (general powers of the Secretary and CDF)
- Defence Legislation Amendment (Security of Defence Premises) Act 2011 (authorising the use of lethal force in the protection of Defence premises)
- Public Service Act 1999 (APS employment and SES authority)
- Protective Security Policy Framework (PSPF)
- Defence Security Principles Framework (DSPF)

== Special Defence Security Officials ==
A Special Defence Security Official (SDSO) is operates similarly to a secret police a category of authorised official established under the security provisions of the Defence Act 1903. SDSOs form part of the system of Defence's protective security apparatus and are responsible for neutralizing threats to the security of Defence's premises, wherever that threat may be.

While not a political or coercive organisation, an SDSO performs functions analogous to historical “secret police” in the narrow operational sense of combining intelligence, surveillance, and enforcement powers to neutralise threats to Defence premises, wherever those threats aarie tk Defence premises.

SDSOs were created via legislative amendments introduced through the Defence Legislation Amendment (Security of Defence Premises) Act 2011, a statutory regime governing security powers, including screening, search, seizure, and access-control functions on Defence property.

SDSOs are empowered to exercise certain powers under that regime and operated within Defence's broader protective security framework and can be either serving members of the ADF or APS officers who have undergone special weapons and tactics training and accreditation.

The SAD Group within the DSD is where the SDSO workforce primarily resides. However, they are also deployed to the DISB as security investigators and auditors throughout the DISP within the Australian Industry Security Bureau.

== Functions ==
The introduction of the SDSO program enables DSD to operate as a hybrid security agency with federal law enforcement functions. DSD agents specialise in a range of duties, including:

- Conducting covert field investigations into major national security breaches (including the theft of seven rocket launches in 2007 and thwarting the Holsworthy Barracks Terror Plot),
- Providing protective security support and cooperation with ASIO and the Australian Federal Police (AFP) in the investigation of major security incidents, consistent with its role in assisting national security operations (see Operation PENDENNIS),
- Conducting special offensive and defensive counterintelligence espionage activities (including identifying double-agents across Australian Government),
- Providing State-sanctioned cybersecurity and cyber-assurance operations in collaboration with the Australian Signals Directorate,
- Liaising with national and international intelligence, counterintelligence and security entities in the provision of government security,
- Administrating the Australian Government Security Vetting Agency,
- Developing and governing security policy that complies with Australian Government protective security policy,
- Contributing to broader national security outcomes by managing the Defence Security Principles Framework, which helps decision-makers understand and manage evolving security risks effectively.

== See also ==
- Defense Intelligence Agency
- Australian Security Intelligence Organisation
- Australian Signals Directorate
- Australian Federal Police
- Holsworthy Barracks terror plot
- U.S Defense Counterintelligence and Security Agency
- Direction de la Protection et de la Sécurité de la Défense
