= Fehmi Naji =

Lebanese-Australian imam and Grand Mufti of Australia

Fehmi Naji El-Imam
- Arabic: فهمي ناجي الإمام
- Title: Grand Mufti of Australia

Personal life
- Born: 1928 Lebanon
- Died: 24 September 2016 (aged 87–88)

Religious life
- Religion: Islam
- Denomination: Sunni
- Institute: Preston Mosque

Muslim leader
- Period in office: 2007–2011
- Predecessor: Taj El-Din Hilaly
- Successor: Ibrahim Abu Mohamed

Fehmi Naji El-Imam AM (Arabic: فهمي ناجي الإمام) (1928 – 24 September 2016) was the Grand Mufti of Australia from June 2007 to September 2011. Born in Lebanon, he arrived in Australia in 1951. He was elected to succeed Taj El-Din Hilaly on 10 June 2007, but by January 2011 Hilaly declared that Naji was no longer active, and that de facto he was functioning as mufti. Naji was succeeded on 18 September 2011 by Ibrahim Abu Mohamed.

Naji questioned Osama bin Laden's responsibility for the September 11 attacks. He was the Head Imam of Preston Mosque in Melbourne and secretary of the Victorian Board of Imams.

He died of natural causes on 24 September 2016.

== Activities ==
Naji served as a board member on the Muslim Community Reference Group, an advisory board established by the Howard government from 2005 to 2006.

Titles in Islam
Preceded by Taj El-Din Hilaly	Grand Mufti of Australia; 2007 to 2011	Succeeded by Ibrahim Abu Mohamed
