= Alex Mendelssohn =

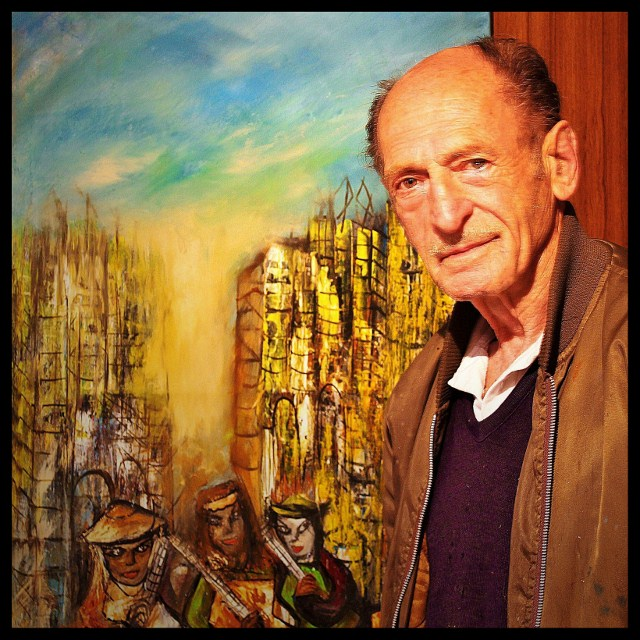
2012 Portrait of Alex Mendelssohn courtesy of Jase Munn, Melbourne, Australia.: Born / 30 May 1935; Died / 10 December 2017; Nationality / Hungarian; Residence / Australia; Renown / Oil Paintings; Genre / Expressionistic Impressionism; Signature / Opalescent Chiaroscuro

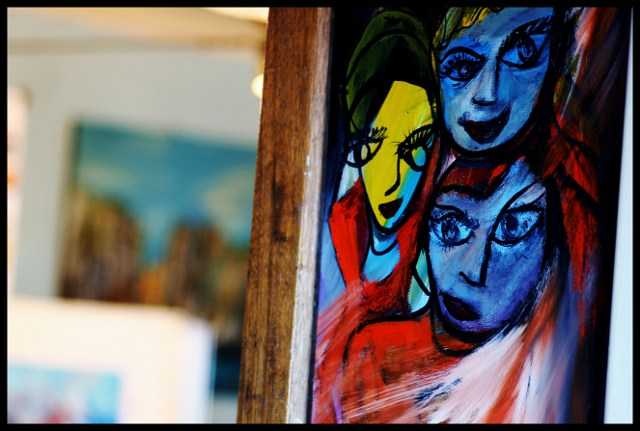
Alex Mendelssohn, 2011, One More for Picasso, oil on canvas, 30 cm x 60 cm, private collection.

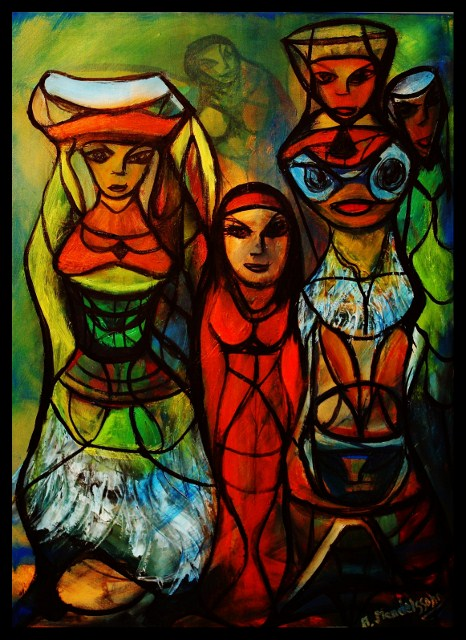
Alex Mendelssohn, 2012, Byzantiens, oil on canvas, 70 cm x 50 cm, private collection.

Alex Mendelssohn (30 May 1935 – 10 December 2017) was an outback artist and opal miner in Australia of Hungarian descent, also known by his birth name Sándor Mendelssohn (variant of the name Alexander in Hungary).

At the interview "His Colorful Life", he professed to Kristina Meredith of Country Press South Australia that he was a born rebel and an adventurer at heart. Alex Mendelssohn migrated from war-worn Hungary in the early 1950s to mine for opal in the stark opal town of Andamooka where the famous Andamooka Opal or Queen's Opal was discovered in the 1950s and presented to Queen Elizabeth II.

For Alex Mendelssohn, the isolated outback community built upon red earth, nicknamed 'Mars on Earth' presented the freedom he craved, far away from the shackles of politics, war, and bureaucracy of his early years. In a radio interview 6.30 with George Negus (28 June 2004) Alex Mendelssohn expressed the reason he called Andamooka his home: "You're not controlled by councils and regulations and laws and rules. You do whatever you bloody like."

== Style and temperament ==
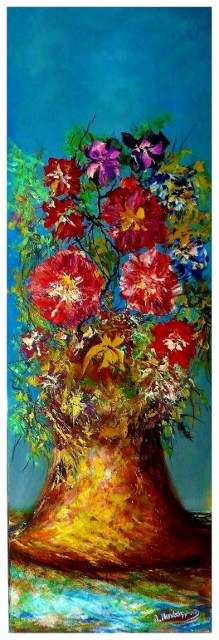
Alex Mendelssohn, 2010, Flower Vase, oil on canvas, 40 cm x 120 cm, private collection.

What characterises an Alex Mendelssohn art piece is the opalescent luster and an other-worldly sensuous quality that creates a sparkly zestful presence. In a video interview by Jase Munn Melbourne (April 2013), Mendelssohn revealed that he studied how light fell on paintings during various times and bathed them in colours to suit changing light.

His creative ardour is reflected in his great body of work and beloved themes of the eastern exotic, feminine form, clowns and musical instruments, spirit worlds, outer space, landscape, cityscape, and vibrant textural paintings of semi-abstract flowers in unbridled abandon. Journalist Alexandra Nowak (2008) described Alex Mendelssohn's art as spontaneous and wildly wonderful.

Alex Mendelssohn began seriously painting in 1973 when he was 38 years old. He sold his first painting for five dollars and never ceased to paint till his death at the age of 82. Painting consistently for 44 years, Alex Mendelssohn's prolific portfolio of artworks exceeded 3,000 pieces of oil paintings, some of which he donated towards charitable causes, and many are in private collections around the world in the United States, Germany, Australia, Vietnam, Malaysia, Japan.

In an interview with Roxby Downs South Australia community newspaper The Monitor (15 August 2012), Alex Mendelssohn encouraged experimentation in painting methodology: "I always tell my classes, you can use anything but the kitchen sink - I don't care what you use as long as you get results with it."

A self-taught artist who liked sharing his oil painting techniques, Mendelssohn believed that all human beings are born with a talent for something. "Some people go through their entire lives never realising the talent they had - but I try to give them a bit of encouragement which is very important."

He believed that practice makes a master, and there isn't such a thing as an absolutely perfect finished piece of art. "I don't care if it's a Michelangelo or Leonardo da Vinci. You can pick faults in every piece of art that has ever been created." What was important to Alex Mendelssohn is the artist's self-satisfaction: the enjoyment when one finishes what one thinks is a good piece of art. "It's a magnificent feeling. You can't describe it. Money cannot buy that."

Alex Mendelssohn was a regular guest on AZ TV 7, Phoenix Arizona from 2001 to 2009. His outspokenness against art critics who do not paint, and anti-art, made him a controversial abrasive figure in the art salon circles.

In his forthright fashion, during an interview that celebrated his 77th birthday in 2012, Alex Mendelssohn said "Art critics often enquired whether I am still alive, as I think the value of my life’s work would be worth more when I am dead." He was fond of making caustic comments that drew reference to age, mortality, and posthumous value of artists.

He was repulsed yet intrigued by the exorbitant art auction prices of dead artists, and was especially annoyed when Picasso's cubist painting of La Lecture, that featured Picasso's mistress asleep in an armchair, sold for $40.7 million at a London auction house. Quoting verbatim in typical Alex Mendelssohn frankness "It's just torn apart bits of a woman."

== Activities ==
In the year 2000, under the auspices of gallery director Nicole Allen, Alex Mendelssohn exhibited with the Manyung Gallery in Melbourne Australia, one of Victoria's oldest (Est. 1968) and largest contemporary art spaces, showcasing Australian paintings and sculpture.

In 2008, Alex Mendelssohn was one of 1,500 international artists chosen to exhibit his work at the New York International Artexpo, world's largest fine art trade show that has hosted many of the world's most renowned artists, including Andy Warhol, Peter Max, Robert Rauschenberg, Robert Indiana, Keith Haring and LeRoy Neiman. That year, the event held annually at the Jacob K. Javits Convention Center, New York, was graced by Nelson Mendela as well British actress Jane Seymour.

On 14 October 2010, the Roxby Downs Art and Cultural Forum teamed up with Alex Mendelssohn to host public oil painting workshops. Other earlier workshops, among his many, was one on 17 May 2006 in support of "The Outback Fringe Festival". In April 2005, supported by the initiatives of Austrade and the Australian Consulate-General in Vietnam, Alex Mendelssohn was the sole artist to represent Australia in a three-day art exhibition at the Legion hotel Ho Chi Minh City.

In September 2007, Alex Mendelssohn donated three of his paintings to raise funds for the Alzheimer's Association - Desert Southwest Chapter, Arizona USA.

In April 2008, Alex Mendelssohn donated his painting entitled Venice to the 14th Annual Celebrity Fight Night in Scottsdale, Arizona, in honour of Muhammad Ali, featuring Live Auction items and star-studded live musical performances that raised funds for the Muhammad Ali Parkinson Center at Barrow Neurological Institute as the primary beneficiary.

Alex Mendelssohn has also painted for the celebrated virtuoso violinist Elizabeth Pitcairn who owns the legendary 1720 Red Mendelssohn Stradivarius violin.

== Themes ==
=== Opalescent colours ===
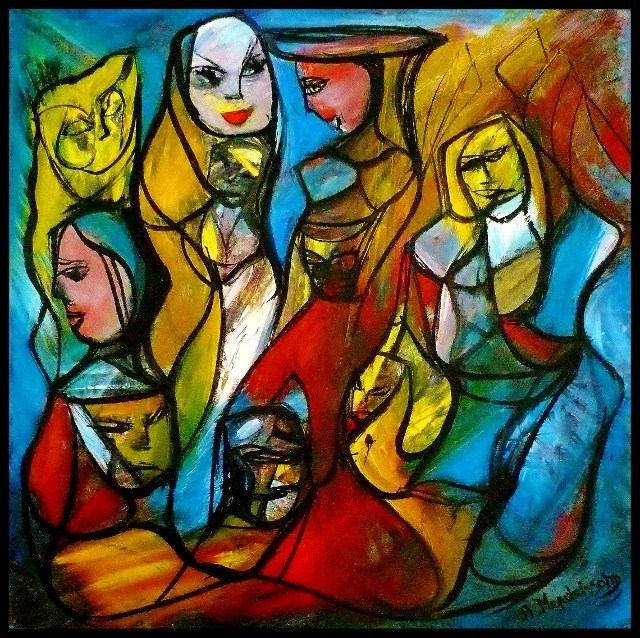
Alex Mendelssohn, 2013, Samurai, oil on canvas, 44.5 cm x 44.5 cm, private collection.

Opalescent colours and bold tactual strokes are strong signatures in Alex Mendelssohn's abstract work of art. They seem to glow and take on a life of their own when displayed under the incandescent light for jewellery, very much like opal.

The intoxicating sense of freedom in the red land he called home, and the colours of Andamookan opals inspired him, as much as his musical soul. His lifestyle in his own words: "Free...to do whatever you want to bloody do, and go wherever you want to bloody go. Free from all the bands and chains... It's a magnificent feeling." - ABC Australia 2014.

The painting Samurai, 2013, encapsulates colours of blue fire opals in typical Mendelssohn cyan, alizarin, ochre, and lime.

=== Clowns and musicians ===
As a child, Alex Mendelssohn was enchanted by his uncle Arnold Mendelssohn who was a musical virtuoso proficient with seven musical instruments and often performed as a circus musical clown. Alex recounted Sunday picnics at the park in Budapest before World War II where his Uncle Arnold would attract large crowds by playing his music and clowning around. His family was largely artistic and musical and his aunt Edith Mendelssohn was a music director at the Royal National Hungarian Academy of Music, Budapest in the 1930s.

=== Spirit world ===
Quote from Alex Mendelssohn in Big Planet: "Most of my work is spiritual. The spirits are definitely around us. And that drives us into a direction. When I am working on a spiritual painting, the spirit does the work. It is like someone having a vision that no one else can see. I can even talk to people while I am painting, but it is not me that is painting, I am only holding the brush. This does not happen every day. When it happens, the spirits and art become one."

His painting Journey Into The Cosmos illustrated soul ascension and spiritual deliverance from coarse earth to an enlightened more rewarding existence.

=== Eternal female ===
According to Alex Mendelssohn, God was at the epitome of creativity with the creation of woman. Married three times, Alex Mendelssohn exalts in the feminine figure that features in a large extent of his artwork.
