= Patricia Bridges =

Australian golfer and sports administrator

Personal information
- Nationality: Australian
- Born: 30 December 1921 Strathfield, New South Wales, Australia
- Died: 5 August 2017 (aged 95) Sydney, New South Wales, Australia
- Spouse: Robert Bridges

Career
- Sport: Golf
- Status: Amateur

Patricia Marie Bridges OBE (née Searl; 30 December 1921 – 5 August 2017) was an Australian golfer and sports administrator. She was the first, and currently only, life member of Golf Australia.

== Early life ==
A capable tennis player as a young woman, Bridges was introduced to golf by her brother-in-law, playing both sports until the war when she concentrated on golf. She joined the Royal Australian Air Force as a general clerk, and was posted on secondment to Canberra, working in the office of the Governor-General during the term of Prince Henry, Duke of Gloucester.

== Golf administration career ==
In the 1950s, she won numerous district championships, and also began to take on administrative roles in the sport, starting as an officeholder in the Far South Coast and Tablelands Golf Association, and later being elected to the New South Wales Golf Union. In 1964, she was appointed to the Australian Ladies' Golf Union, becoming a selector and ALGU vice-president in 1969. In 1970, she was elected president of the ALGU, and was re-elected for two later terms. From 1994 to 2000, she was chair of the women's committee of the World Amateur Golf Council—the first Australian to hold an executive position on an international golf committee.

== Honours ==
In the 1981 New Year Honours, Bridges was appointed an Officer of the Order of the British Empire (OBE) for services to golf and the community.

The trophy of the Women's Australian Open is named the Patricia Bridges Bowl in her honour.
