= Yummy Mummies =

Australian reality TV series

- Genre: Reality television
- Country of origin: Australia
- Original language: English
- No. of seasons: 2
- No. of episodes: 20

Production
- Running time: 40 minutes
- Production company: Seven Productions

Original release
- Network: Seven Network
- Release: 9 July 2017 – 2017
- Network: 7plus
- Release: 2018

Yummy Mummies is an Australian reality television series that premiered on 9 July 2017 on the Seven Network. The show follows wealthy, expectant mums who support each other through the challenges of pregnancy and motherhood.

Despite poor ratings and critical reception, the series was renewed for a second season, which premiered on 7plus in 2018. The series is also available on Netflix, where it is presented as a Netflix Original outside of Australia.

== Episodes ==
No.	Title	Original release date	Australian viewers (thousands)
1	Episode 1	9 July 2017	755,000
After seeing the Melbourne Yum Mums’ Instagram feed, Maria invites them to her baby shower in Adelaide – a lavish affair with a luxury theme.
2	Episode 2	9 July 2017	428,000
The Melbourne mums arrive safely at Maria’s, where she shows off her designer baby gear and introduced the girls to her mother, Margherita.
3	Episode 3	11 July 2017	354,000
Maria celebrates her baby shower, with the Melbourne Yummy Mummies in attendance.
4	Episode 4	18 July 2017	289,000
Maria and Carlos indulge in a photoshoot on their 'babymoon'. Meanwhile, the girls get down and dirty trying to get Lorinska over her breastfeeding phobia.
5	Episode 5	25 July 2017	281,000
It's the Yummy Mummies event of the year, but there's news that's going to cause a huge shock, and an uninvited guest could spoil the big party.
6	Episode 6	25 July 2017	227,000
Jane and Lorinksa visit Rachel at the hospital. Maria starts having contractions.
7	Episode 7	1 August 2017	263,000
The Melbourne girls try to bring on labour for Lorinska who is overdue, and worrying over house renovations instead of nesting.
8	Episode 8	1 August 2017	207,000
Margherita persuades Maria to get a nanny and Lorinska hosts a sip and see.
9	Episode 9	TBA	TBD
Lorinska, Rachel and Maria take their babies to a casting call, and Margherita hosts her 60th birthday party.
10	Episode 10	TBA	TBD
Jane has her baby, the casting call's winning baby is announced, and Maria has a holiday surprise.

== Reception ==
Yummy Mummies was panned by critics.

Writing for news.com.au, Debbie Schipp was highly critical of the show. Schipp described it as "fabricated, contrived, vapid, vacuous, pointless tripe". Schipp wrote that she had watched the show so others don't have to. Schipp further attacked the show as "not even car-crash. It’s cringe-making".

In The Sydney Morning Herald, Craig Mathieson wrote that "To call Yummy Mummies car-crash television is to understate how garish, stupid, weird, poorly executed, and dutifully offensive it is".
