= Chan Han Choi =

South Korean-born Australian hospital worker and civil engineer

- Born: 1958 (age 67–68); Seoul, South Korea
- Other name: Solomon
- Occupations: Hospital cleaner and civil engineer
- Known for: Breaking United Nations sanctions against North Korea
- Children: 1 son

Chan Han Choi (born c. 1958) is a South Korean-born Australian man who in December 2017 was arrested by Australian police and charged with breaking sanctions against North Korea. It was found that he attempted to broker deals for missile components and coal to raise funds for the regime. Choi pleaded guilty and was sentenced to three years prison.

== Early life ==
Chan Han Choi was born in Seoul, South Korea, around 1958. He emigrated to Australia around 1987.

== Career ==
Chan Han Choi is known to have an interest in engineering and has established several engineering companies. In 2002 he filed an application for a trademark for a water purification system. More recently he has worked as a hospital cleaner in Sydney.

== North Korea ==
Chan Han Choi has a history of involvement with the North Korean regime. He was part of efforts to include North Korean athletes in a unified Korean team at the Sydney 2000 Olympic Games and sources quoted in The Times claimed that he had visited the country many times and that he told people he would send money there. In December 2017 he was arrested by Australian police and charged with breaking sanctions against North Korea by attempting to broker deals for missile components and coal to raise funds for the North Korean regime. Details of the proposed arrest were accidentally leaked on social media in advance by the Australian Federal Police.

On 27 July 2021 Choi was sentenced to three years prison after pleading guilty for breaking United Nations sanctions with North Korea.

== Personal life ==
Chan Han Choi is divorced from a Korean-Australian woman and has a 30-year-old son. He lives in Eastwood, a suburb of Sydney known for its Korean community, and was active in Sydney's Korean Christian community Saesoon Presbyterian Church at North Rocks before becoming alienated from them according to The Times.
