= 2017 Brighton siege =

Terror hostage-taking in 2017 in Melbourne, Australia

- Location: 37.906551°S 145.007686°E; Brighton, Melbourne, Australia
- Date: 5 June 2017
- Attack type: Shooting; siege; terrorist attack
- Weapon: Sawn-off Nikko Over-Under Shotgun (also possessed another shotgun)
- Deaths: 2 (including the perpetrator)
- Injuries: 3 police officers
- Perpetrator: Islamic State
- Assailant: Yacqub Khayre
- Motive: Islamic extremism

On 5 June 2017, Yacqub Khayre, a 29-year-old Somali-born Australian, murdered a receptionist and held a sex worker hostage at the Buckingham International Serviced Apartments, located in Brighton, a suburb of Melbourne, Australia. In a subsequent shoot-out with a police tactical unit, Khayre was killed and three police officers were wounded. Police consider the siege an act of terrorism. The Islamic State claimed responsibility for the attack.

== Siege ==
On 5 June 2017, Yacqub Khayre made a telephone booking for a female escort through an escort agency to meet in an apartment at the Buckingham International Serviced Apartments. At 4:00 pm, the 36-year-old escort arrived by taxi and attended at apartment 11 as arranged and was taken hostage by Khayre and held captive in the bathroom. Khayre was armed with two shotguns. At approx. 4:10 pm, the escort managed to free herself and made a phone call to Victoria Police via 000. Shortly after, Khayre phoned police stating it was a hostage situation, no one was to attend apartment 11 otherwise the hostage would die, the receptionist was dead and that there was a bomb on the premises. In the foyer of the complex, Khayre fatally shot the receptionist, 36-year-old Kai Hao. Khayre around this time tampered with the GPS ankle monitor, which he was wearing as a condition of his parole.

At approx. 4:44 pm, Khayre called police again making similar statements as the previous call. Specialist police were called in: the Critical Incident Response Team (CIRT) arrived first, followed by the Special Operations Group (SOG) who took over tactical command. At 5:04 pm, police located the receptionist dead in the foyer. At 5:41 pm, Khayre made a phone call to Seven News stating "This is for IS, this is for al-Qaeda".

At approx. 6:02 pm, Khayre emerged from apartment 11 exiting the front of the complex. Yelling and running, he fired a Nikko sawed-off over-under shotgun twice at SOG officers, who exchanged fire and killed him. Three SOG officers were shot including one suffering a hand injury and another facial injuries. The hostage was freed in the apartment by police and had not been physically harmed during the ordeal.

== Perpetrator ==
Born in Somalia, Khayre arrived in Australia at age 3 in 1991 as a refugee via a Kenyan refugee camp and grew up in the northern suburbs of Melbourne. Whilst at secondary school in Year 12 his grandfather died. He subsequently dropped out of school and began using drugs and alcohol, including ice to which he became addicted, and started committing criminal offences. The crimes including burglaries and thefts, assaults and an armed robbery with a knife.

In April 2009, he travelled back to Somalia, where he is alleged to have undertaken military training with the militant Islamist group Al-Shabaab, with a view to participating in Somali insurgency against that country's government. Whilst in Somalia, he successfully sought from a sheikh a fatwa, a religious order, that police alleged was to authorise a terrorist attack in Australia. After he returned to Australia in July 2009, he was charged, along with others, with conspiracy to commit a terrorist attack on the Holsworthy Army Barracks. At his trial, his lawyer argued that the fatwa was to do with fraud and obtaining money to support Al-Shabaab in Somalia. He was acquitted in December 2010 having spent 16 months in prison on remand.

He committed further criminal offences and in 2011 returned to prison including for possession of a firearm. In 2012, he committed a home invasion for which he was sentenced to five years imprisonment and was released on parole in December 2016 (he set two fires whilst in prison).

== Investigation ==
The Chief Commissioner of Victoria Police Graham Ashton stated that police were treating the siege as a terrorist incident given the comments made by Khayre referring to ISIS and al-Qaeda and also given his past involvement with the Holsworthy Barracks terrorist plot. Ashton stated that police did not know if the crime was spontaneous or was planned, and if so, whether it was a deliberate attempt to lure police to the scene to ambush them. Detectives established that the unregistered shotgun used in the siege was illegally trafficked on 19 May 2017 for $2,000 to a middle man for Khayre.

== Reactions ==
Prime Minister Malcolm Turnbull stated Australia faced "a growing threat from Islamist terrorism" and that he would push states to reform parole laws, questioning how a person with a history of violence was allowed on parole.

The ISIL propaganda outlet Amaq declared the gunman was a soldier of Islamic State and that the attack was to target citizens.

The Islamic Council of Victoria described it as a "horrendous crime" and stated they understand "that the police are investigating this as a potential terrorist attack but note that the perpetrator himself appeared to be confused as to who he was acting on behalf, claiming allegiance to both ISIS and al-Qaeda, known enemies."

On 16 June 2017, the Minister for Justice Michael Keenan announced that following recent events that a national firearms amnesty would commence on 1 July 2017 to hand in unregistered or unwanted firearms stating the national security environment had deteriorated with terror attacks using illegal guns including the shooting of Curtis Cheng in 2015 and the Lindt Cafe siege in 2014. The firearms amnesty is Australia's first national amnesty since 1996 following the Port Arthur massacre.

== See also ==
- List of mass shootings in Australia
- 2018 Melbourne stabbing attack
