= Grand Mufti of Australia =

Australian Sunni Muslim cleric

- Incumbent; Ibrahim Abu Mohammed since 2011-2018; 2018-present
- Office of the Grand Mufti of Australia
- Style: Sunni tradition of Islam
- Status: Muslim cleric
- Term length: No fixed term
- Formation: 1992
- Website: www.anic.org.au

The Grand Mufti of Australia is a Sunni Muslim cleric, or Grand Mufti, chosen to represent and answer questions from the growing Muslim population. Nominated by the Australian National Imams Council (ANIC), the current Grand Mufti of Australia since 2018 is Ibrahim Abu Mohammed. Mohammed previously held the position from 2011–2018, and became Grand Mufti again after his successor, Abdel Aziem Al-Afifi died in office after a four-month tenure.

ANIC's vision with the Grand Mufti was to unite the Australian Islamic community under a single leader and promote harmony and integration between Muslims and non-Muslims.

The Mufti has a responsibility to issue fatwas, which are formal verdicts regarding Islamic law, in response to a question posed by a private individual or judge.

The practicality of a Grand Mufti in Australia has been criticised by scholars such as Abdalla (2011), who states that a singular mufti only offers the mainstream interpretation of Islam, and that this is unrepresentative of the diverse Australian Islamic community. He proposes the formation of a council of imams from different traditions such as Shia, Zaidi and Ismaili, and specialists in medicine, law and finance, stating this would be better source of guidance for Australian Muslims.

== Role ==
A mufti can be defined as a religious leader who is qualified to offer nonbinding rulings (fatwas) on a point of Islamic law. Fatwas are offered in response to a question posed by an individual or judge and are then published to the wider community in legal reference manuals. Fatwas are not obligatory, so the questioner can reject and seek fatwas elsewhere, but it still can play a pivotal role in facilitating the practice of Islam.

The general role of the Grand Mufti according to ANIC is to respect the ethnic diversity of Australian Muslims, be faithful to Islamic teachings, and be a relatable figure that Australian Muslims can seek guidance from. The Grand Mufti of Australia can hold the position for a maximum of two three-year terms and is elected by a committee of 18 members from ANIC.

According to Abou El Fadl, a Professor of Law at UCLA specialising in Islamic jurisprudence, a mufti must display five key qualities: “honesty, diligence, comprehensiveness, reasonableness, and self-restraint”, or be deemed not competent of inheriting the position. Abdalla (2011), the founder of the Griffith Islamic Research Unit, recounts other qualifications deemed necessary for a mufti, such as a solid understanding of the Qur’an, Hadith literature and Arabic language, the ability to perform independent legal reasoning, and respect for the intellectual and political contexts of the host country. Abdalla stresses the importance of these conditions, commenting that non competent muftis can cause havoc on the way some Muslims practice their faith.

In comparison to Muslim countries, Australia is predominantly a secular society, and thus the Grand Mufti’s role is limited in that it is not state-appointed and instead managed by the Islamic body, Australian National Imams Council.

== History ==
The first Mufti of Australia was elected by the Australian Federation of Islamic Councils in 1988. However, following some offensive comments about women’s dress code, Taj el-Din Hamid Hilali was fired from his position in 2007. A meeting was held to discuss the matter with around eighty qualified Muslim leaders, and this led to the creation of the Australian National Imams Council and the election of a new Mufti, Sheikh Fehmi Naji el- Imam.

== Beliefs ==
The Grand Mufti of Australia in 2020, Dr Ibrahim Abu Mohammed, has stated he values community harmony and intends to minimise Islamophobia and promote a culture of respect. He describes Islamophobia as an irrational fear or prejudice against Islam and states it may have arisen from a general fear of changing the country’s identity.

Dr Ibrahim Abu Mohammed publicly condemns terrorist and other acts against community harmony. He blames Islamophobia for the 2019 Christchurch mass shooting, stating in an interview, “this criminal actor’s feelings were not formed yesterday, but as a result of political mobilization and hatred against Muslims from some irresponsible media figures and some senior politicians”. In 2020 he commented that officials such as the United Nations should pass a law that bans hate speech.

He also encourages Australian Muslims, especially the youth, to avoid seeking advice online, as foreign Islamic sites may not understand life in Australia or may spread extremist ideologies. Extremists and terrorists use virtual media platforms to gain more followers, create a brand image, and source funding, partnerships, and suppliers. It enables them to conduct these activities on a global scale, at a low cost, and encrypt their messages so they can operate anonymously. For this reason, Dr Ibrahim Abu Mohammed made an announcement to the Muslim youth of Australia in 2016, persuading them to learn from reputable sheiks who have studied at Islamic learning institutions and lead at local mosques, instead of ‘Sheikh’ Google or ‘Sheikh’ YouTube as “you are not a foreigner” and these sites are “imposters”.

Another predominant belief of the Grand Mufti is the necessity of ijtihad. Muslims may interpret the Sharia in different ways, with some believing the rules should be followed exactly as they were written (taqlid), and others believing the rules should be re-evaluated when necessary according to modern and country-specific policies. The latter view is fundamental to ijtihad, a process defined as independent legal reasoning. Dr Ibrahim Abu Mohammed believes in and bases his fatwas upon ijtihad to promote community harmony between Islamic and state law. For example, when asked about organ donation, which is traditionally prohibited in Islamic law, Mohammed applied ijtihad, and commented that if it is performed morally, then saving a life overpowers a violation of Sharia law.

== Influence of the media ==
The high incidence of negative media coverage of Islam and Muslims in Australia has resulted in Australian Muslims feeling excluded from the wider Australian society. It is suggested that news media practitioners, scholars, Muslims, and the Grand Mufti need to establish standards to reporting neutral and balanced news.

Many Australian Muslims have stated the rise of Islamophobia is correlated with negative portrayals of Islam in the media and that some television channels, radio stations and politicians nearing election times have in effect put them on the defensive for their Islamic faith. Nahid Kabir, a humanities professor at Edith Cowan University affirms this point, commenting in 2006, Islam remains “the focus of topical discourse”, because the media focuses extensively on “Islamic militants…and does not counter this with balanced coverage” and it is unlikely that this approach will be reassessed in the future.

Dr Ibrahim Abu Mohammed himself has also been a subject in the media, seen in his response to the November 2015 Paris attacks. He admonished the attacks stating the act was inexcusable, cowardly, and horrifying, but it was also a sign that racism and Islamophobia need to be addressed. The statement became widespread in the media and a large reception of people were offended by the comment and viewed the Mufti as defending terrorism. Two days later Mohammed posted an apology regretting his statement and the causative factors it may have implied.

The Daily Telegraph posted two newspapers on the subject, titled “The unwise mufti” and “Even Hamas condemn the Paris attacks so why won’t Australia’s Grand Mufti Ibrahim Abu Mohammed?” The Grand Mufti is therefore also at risk of being demonised in the media and is expected to report quickly and carefully on current world events, as well as promote awareness of Islamophobia to reduce prejudice the media created against Australian Muslims.

== Criticisms ==
Scholars such as Abdalla (2011) and Black & Hosen (2009) have commented that it is unrealistic for one religious authority to unify the diverse Australian Muslim community. The majority of Australian Muslims are Sunni followers, yet the minority are mostly Shi’tes, and others are Bektashis, Ahmadis, Alawis and Druze. Australian Muslims are also from a variety of backgrounds, with around "two-thirds born overseas in countries such as Lebanon, Turkey, Afghanistan, Bosnia-Herzegovina, Pakistan, Indonesia, Iraq, Bangladesh, Iran, Fiji, Cyprus, Somalia, Egypt and Malaysia”. Abdalla (2011) and Black & Hosen (2009) therefore conclude a singular mufti of the Sunni tradition is impractical to assisting followers of the minority traditions.

As fatwas are not obligatory, some Australian Muslims seek their fatwas from their local imam or they look online, and in 2009 Australia was the seventh-ranked country out of 128 to seek their fatwas from overseas scholars. Researchers in Islamic studies conclude this could be a result of a lack of confidence in the current Australian system.

Abdalla (2011) and Black & Hosen (2009) therefore propose the formation of a collective body of scholars to lead the Australian Muslim community, with some imams issuing more progressive fatwas, and others more fundamentalist. The body will also include specialists in the areas of medicine, finance and law and imams or translators who speak languages such as Arabic, Turkish and Persian. They believe this will cater more for the ethnic diversity of Australian Muslims and balance religious and state laws more effectively.

== List of Grand Muftis ==
1. Taj El-Din Hilaly (1992–2007)
2. Fehmi Naji (2007–2011)
3. Ibrahim Abu Mohamed (2011–2018)
4. Abdel Aziem Al-Afifi (2018)
5. Abdul Quddoos Al-Azhari (2021 - 2024)
