= Sandy Gandhi =

Australian comedian and journalist

- Sandy "Hatmama" Gandhi
- Born: Sandra Aranha; 28 January 1959; New Delhi, India
- Died: 1 February 2017 (aged 58)
- Occupations: Stand-up comedian, newspaper columnist

Sandy Gandhi (born Sandra Aranha; 28 January 1959 – 1 February 2017) was an Australian comedian and columnist based in Byron Bay, New South Wales, Australia. Byron Bay is Australia's easternmost point, and accordingly Gandhi proclaimed herself to be "Australia's Most Easterly Indian". She was one of two women who were the inspiration for the Little Heroes song, One Perfect Day, according to lead singer Roger Wells.

== Early life ==
Sandy Aranha was born in New Delhi, India. She spent most of her time there in Bangalore before relocating with her family to Melbourne, Australia at the age of 12.

== Career ==
At the age of 21, she went to London, and her work there as a tour operator took her travelling all over the world. When not doing her stand-up comedy or writing her column, Gandhi was a carer, working with people with dementia and people with acute schizophrenia.

=== Stand up comedy ===
Gandhi regularly performed stand-up shows around Northern New South Wales. She also featured in the 2008 Melbourne Comedy Festival. Her brand of ethnic comedy combines observational humour with Indian stereotypes, drawing also on the fact that there is a large Indian-Australian population in Northern New South Wales. Ethnic humour is a popular form of comedy in Australia, which has a multicultural population.

In early 2008, she returned to India and performed there, including an appearance at her childhood home of Bangalore. Since she lived near Bangalow, northern NSW, she referred to her Indian tour as "From Bangalow to Bangalore".

=== Writings ===
Gandhi also wrote a humorous column titled "Enlighten Up" which appears in The Pulse, the weekly entertainment supplement to the Lismore Northern Star.

Her first book, also called Enlighten Up and containing a compilation of her columns was released (or as Gandhi put it "was given birth to") in August 2008. Enlighten Up is published by Melbourne Books, Australia.

=== TV and film ===
On 4 February 2009, she appeared on the Australian Channel Seven Network's Australia's Got Talent program.

She was selected to go through to the semi-finals which was aired on 11 March 2009.

In 2016, she starred in a short film, Spice Sisters, written and directed by Sheila Jadayev.

== Death ==
Gandhi died suddenly at her home on 1 February 2017, reportedly while talking to a friend on the telephone. She had celebrated both her 59th birthday and the screening of "Spice Sisters" at the Mullumbimby leg of Flickerfest 2017 only days before.
