= Australian National Imams Council =

Islamic organization based in Australia

- Formation: November 14, 2006; 20 years ago
- Registration no.: (ABN) 66 122 669 318
- Purpose: To unite the Imams of Australia under one umbrella body
- Headquarters: Lakemba, New South Wales
- Coordinates: 33.922514°S 151.078617°E
- Region served: Australia
- Products: ANIC Halal Authority
- Members: 200 Imams
- President: Shady Alsuleiman
- Affiliations: Sunni based
- Website: www.anic.org.au

The Australian National Imams Council (ANIC) is a Muslim body that represents imams and Muslims in Australia, with over 200 member imams from all states and territories and major Australian cities. It is one of two Australian Muslim organisations that appoint a Grand Mufti of Australia, the other being the Australian Federation of Islamic Councils (AFIC).

== Foundation ==
Australian National Imams Council (ANIC) was created in 2006 after more than 80 Sunni imams met to respond to a crisis caused by comments made by Taj El-Din Hilaly.

== Overview ==
The Australian National Imams Council is a Muslim body that represents imams and Muslims in Australia, with over 200 member imams from all states and territories and major Australian cities.

=== Grand Mufti ===
The ANIC is one of two Australian Muslim organisations that appoint a Grand Mufti of Australia. In 2011 Ibrahim Abu Mohamed was appointed Grand Mufti by ANIC.

As of 2018, the Grand Mufti of Australia appointed by Australian Federation of Islamic Councils (AFIC) is Abdul Quddoos Al-Azhari. There has been controversy about the appointment of two Muftis in Australia, and despite the mostly symbolic and ceremonial nature of the position, ANIC has fought hard to prevent anyone else from claiming to represent Australian Muslims as a Mufti.

== Views and activities ==
In 2011, ANIC requested that the Darulfatwa-supported Muslim Community Radio Incorporated not have its licence renewed due to ties with Al-Ahbash and because of its promotion of "sectarian fringe views".

In 2014, ANIC expressed concerns regarding a bill in the Australian Parliament that would broaden the offence of advocating terrorism. ANIC argued that the legislation would have chilling effects on free speech. It also said that any religious community referring to violent passages in the Qur'an or Bible could face sanction under this law. Other Australian Muslim groups, including the Islamic Council of Victoria and Muslim Legal Network, also expressed concerns regarding the legislation.

In February 2015 the Grand Mufti said the Australian Government should not ban Hizb ut-Tahrir, saying the group is "actually pro-freedom of speech". The prime minister, Tony Abbott, responded by saying the comments were "unhelpful".

In early February 2026 ANIC, along with the Jewish Council of Australia and the Belgium-based Hind Rajab Foundation, co-signed a submission to the Australian Government requesting to ban Israeli President Isaac Herzog from visiting the country, and a criminal investigation to be set up under the Commonwealth criminal code JCA has further stated that the visit from Herzog, who is scheduled to visit the site of the Bondi Beach shooting, is using Jewish pain as a political prop.

== See also ==
- Darulfatwa - Islamic High Council of Australia
- Grand Mufti of Australia
- Islam in Australia
- Islamic organisations in Australia
- Islamic schools and branches
