= Mahāprajña =

Teacher of Jainism

Acharya Mahāprajña
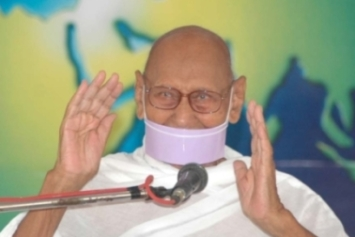
- Mahapragya

Personal life
- Born: 14 June 1920 Tamkor, India
- Died: 9 May 2010 (aged 89) Sardarshahar, India
- Parent(s): Tola Ram Choraria (father), Baluji (mother)

Religious life
- Religion: Jainism
- Sect: Śvetāmbara Terapanth

Religious career
- Predecessor: Acharya Tulsi
- Successor: Mahashraman

Acharya Shri Mahapragya (Hindi: आचार्य महाप्रज्ञ Ācārya mahapragya) (14 June 1920 – 9 May 2010) was the tenth head of the Śvetāmbara Terapanth order of Jainism. Mahapragya was a saint, yogi, spiritual leader, philosopher, author, orator, and poet.

He began his life of religious reflection and development as a Jain monk at the age of ten. Mahapragya played a major role in Anuvrat movement launched by his Guru Acharya Tulsi in 1949, and became the acknowledged leader of the movement in 1995. Acharya Mahapragya formulated the well organized Preksha meditation system in the 1970s, and developed the "Science of Living" education system which is a practical approach for the balanced development of a student and his character building.

He traversed more than 100,000 km on foot covering more than 10,000 villages reaching out to the masses spreading the message of harmony and peace. He walked across the length and breadth of India, from Kutch district in Gujarat to Kolkata and from Punjab to Kanyakumari. Mahapragya undertook this travel under the leadership of Acharya Tulsi and later with himself being the leader. During these travels, he addressed thousands of public meetings. Mahapragya, an apostle of nonviolence, launched the Ahimsa Yatra movement in 2001 which continued until 2009 to promote non-violence and harmony.

== Biography ==
=== Early life ===
Mahapragya was born to Tola Ram Choraria and Baluji in the small village of Tamkor in Rajasthan. It was a Jain Shwetambar Terapanthi Oswal family. He was called Nathmal by his family. He lost his father when he was just two and half months old. It was an extended family and he gained support from all the family members. Nathmal's mother was very affectionate for the child and took care with his upbringing. There was no formal school in Tamkor village in those days and he did not receive a formal education. He nonetheless had lessons on letters and mathematics tables from local teacher(s). Mahapragya's mother was a religious lady who devoted her spare time to spiritual matters. She also used to recite religious songs which made an imprint on the young child. Her spirituality inspired him. Mahapragya received lessons on philosophy from Jain monks who visited the village. Eventually he conveyed to his mother his wish to be initiated into monkhood. On 29 January 1931, he became a monk at the age of ten. Acharya Kalugani, eighth Acharya of Jain Swetambar Terapanth initiated him to monkhood in the town of Sardarsahar (Rajasthan). With this, Nathmal became Muni Nathmal. Acharya Kalugani arranged for Muni Nathmal's studies under Muni Tulsi's classes, who later became the Ninth Acharya. Nathmal started getting lessons in the monastery on various subjects of Jain philosophy.

With Muni Tulsi, the child's intellectual development accelerated and he memorised thousands of sermons and verses in Hindi, Sanskrit, Prakrit, and Rajasthani. His education at the monastery included history, philosophy, logic, and grammar. In Sanskrit, he was also an expert impromptu or extempore poet and demonstrated this skill in many gatherings of intellectuals. He also studied physics, biology, ayurved, politics, economics, and sociology.

== Spiritual endeavors (1945–1978) ==
=== Anuvrat movement ===
Mahapragya played an instrumental role in the Anuvrat movement launched on 2 March 1949 by his guru and the head of Jain Shwetambra Terapanth, Acharya Tulsi. The ultimate aim of the movement was and remains to create a nonviolent socio-political world order with the help of a worldwide network of self-transformed people. Since its inception it has inspired millions of people to practice purity and self-discipline in their personal preparation of the contents of Anuvrat and worked as a core member in the movement, many times representing Acharya Tulsi by explaining the principles of Anuvrat.

Acharya Shri Tulsi nominated Muni Nathmal as the Secretary (Nikaya Sachiv) of Terapanth in 1965 at Hissar, Haryana, after being Group leader (Agraganya) for almost 21 years.

=== Agam research and editing ===
After consulting Mahapragya, Acharya Tulsi decided to start the research, translation and annotation of the Jain Agamas. The work started in 1955 in Ujjain under the leadership of Acharya Tulsi with Mahapragya being the editorial director. Joint activity of Acharya Tulsi, Mahapragya and other intellectual monks and nuns began to facilitate the permanent preservation of many thousands of years old canonical scriptures. This old literature is in Prakrit language and its commentaries are either available in Prakrit or Prakrit mixed with Sanskrit. The original text of the thirty-two Agam scriptures was determined and their Hindi translation also completed. Detailed commentaries thereon made them more interesting and comprehensible. Acharang Bhasyam is Mahapragya's commentary for Acharang in sanskrit. He uncovered many Agam mysteries and presented root philosophies and Mahavira's philosophy and vision in this commentary.

=== Formulation of Preksha Meditation System ===
While in his late twenties, Mahapragya started to realize the wonders of meditation. He was open to experiment with spiritual techniques. He discussed his discoveries with Acharya Tulsi and thereafter Mahapragya started dedicating more time to meditation practices. He exercised deep practice of meditation and experimented with various techniques. He made a deep research of Jain Agamas, ancient scriptures, Yoga science, Biology, Modern Physics, Naturopathy, and Ayurveda, etc. After a deep practice for over 20 years, he formulated the Preksha meditation system in 1975. He formulated the meditation system in a very well organized and scientific way. The basic four wings of the meditation system can be summarized as – Meditation, Yogasana and Pranaayam, Mantra, and therapy.

Before presenting Preksha meditation in formal training camps, Mahapragya made a special practice of meditation and spiritual exertion for a period of nine months which started on 3 March 1977. The First formal Preksha meditation camp was organized later in 1977.

Since that time Acharya Mahapragya had conducted hundreds of camps for training in Preksha meditation. Research, detail training, and studies on Preksha Meditation is an important activity at Jain Vishva Bharati University.

=== Science of Living Education System ===
Science of Living education system is an effort to implement value-based education and moral education. Its goal and approach is overall development of student and not simply just the intellectual development. Mere intellectual development can't help in building real experience and character of the student. It aims for a balanced emotional, intellectual and physical development. It gives more emphasis on practical training as compared to mere philosophy. The model includes Yoga, Pranayam, Postures, Meditation, contemplation techniques, etc. Scientific techniques of Science of Living helps in balancing the emotions of the student. It helps in balanced functioning of the neuro-endocrine system in body. It works for the transformation of emotions, inculcate positive attitude and integrated development of personality.

Acharya Mahapragya conceived the idea of 'Science of Living' on 28 December 1979 at Jain Vishva Bharati, Ladnun, Rajasthan. Mahapragya developed the Science of Living education system model. Many camps were conducted for the teachers of Nagore district, Rajasthan. Science of Living started getting positive reception from ministry of education and various educational society. Rajasthan ministry of education facilitated the training of teachers and camps were started. Some people started research in this field. Few schools were selected to start implementation of Science of Living. After one year of its implementation in schools, the results were surprising and very positive for students. It started getting wider acceptance with education ministry of Indian Government and state governments. Many schools started including it in their curriculum.

Science of Living got very positive feedback from teachers, student and parents on the student's emotional and overall development as such. Some of the feedback can be summarized as reduce in stress, improved efficiency in studies, better concentration and memory, better anger management, etc.

== Successor to Acharya Tulsi ==
Impressed by Muni Nathmal (later Mahapragya), Acharya Tulsi honored him with the qualitative epithet of Mahapragya (highly knowledged) on 12 November 1978.

On 4 February 1979, his appellation 'Mahapragya' was converted into his new name by Acharya Tulsi and he was also made 'Yuvacharya', successor designate to the present Acharya, the second highest position after the Acharya himself. With this elevation, he was now referred as Yuvacharya Mahapragya. As a Yuvacharya , Mahapragya became a close associate of Acharya Tulsi in major decisions and activities related to the sect.

In a public meeting on 18 February 1994, Acharya Tulsi declared that Mahapragya would now have the title of 'Acharya' also and that the former was renouncing this position forthwith. Subsequently, on 5 February 1995, Mahapragya was formally consecrated as the 10th Acharya – the supreme head – of the Terapanth religious order in a public meeting in Delhi. Having been elevated within Terapanth, Mahapragya received many responsibilities. Further intensification of the movements of Anuvrat, Preksha dhyan, and Jeevan Vigyan now became his primary concern. A Vikash Parishad – development council – has been constituted by Mahapragya to give further fillip to all these movements and underline their importance.

=== Jain Vishva Bharati University ===
Acharya Mahapragya played a key role in the conception and establishment of Jain Vishva Bharati University, Ladnun, Rajasthan . It was established under the spiritual patronage of Acharya Tulsi in 1991. Acharya Mahapragya served as head of this university since 1995. The university's objective is to revive truths and values hidden in the ancient Indian traditions in general and in the Jain tradition in particular. It provides platforms and infrastructures for doing research in various subjects and for the pursuance of doctorate degrees. One of the prime objectives of this university is to spread literacy in subjects like nonviolence and peace, Jainology, Sanskrit, Prakrit, yoga, meditation, and literature. Regular degree courses leading to bachelor's and master's degrees are presently being conducted.

=== Ahimsa Yatra (2001–2009) ===
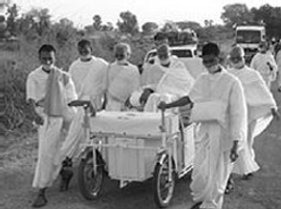
Acharya Mahapragya during Ahimsa Yatra.

The world's problems touched Acharya Mahapragya deeply. In response, he came up with the solution of Ahimsa Yatra, a journey on foot to advance the cause of non-violence, was launched by Mahapragya 5 December 2001 at Sujangarh in Rajasthan. With Ahimsa Yatra, Acharyaji's mission is to train and spread nonviolence and its broad perspective to people. It is an endeavor to awaken a new faith in the infinite power of nonviolence. It aims at bringing the problems of all forms of violence into sharp focus. Its mission is to provide training for transforming the negative thoughts/emotions into positive direction. The spiritual aspect of non-violence training is to ignite the consciousness of non-violence and to cultivate the values of non-violence. And its practical aspect is the employment training for livelihood.

Having eschewed violence and pledged to refrain from killing innocent creatures; political leaders, social workers, and spiritual leaders came to him for advice. He took his Yatra from Rajasthan to Gujarat, Maharashtra, Daman, Madhya Pradesh, Haryana, Delhi, some parts of Uttar Pradesh, Punjab, and Chandigarh. He passed through 87 districts of India, and covered more than 2400 villages, towns and cities, where he held meetings with many spiritual and political leaders and appealed for communal harmony.

This Yatra allowed him to come into direct contact with farmers and common and poor people of the villages which he visited. He stopped at all the small villages on his route and held open mass meetings. Through this public speaking, Acharyaji created awareness on the broad perspectives of nonviolence, unemployment eradication, leading a life free from drug addiction, bad habits, communal harmony, healthy living, and harmonious social and personal lives. Side by side volunteers spread out in different directions in order to establish personal contact with families afflicted by drug addictions, unemployment, and stress. These volunteers were then to stay behind in order to help solve the afflicted's problems. Verily the villages and towns trekked by the Acharya become centres of training in ahimsa.

The Yatra concluded 4 January 2009 at Sujangarh, the same place where it had been begun.

=== FUREC ===
President of India, Dr. A P J Abdul Kalam's vision for a fully developed beautiful India with prosperous and harmonious life for its citizens, especially the youth, motivated enlightened spiritual and religious leaders who organized a Conclave under the aegis of Acharya Mahapragya at Surat on 15 October 2003, also the birthday of Dr. A.P.J. Abdul Kalam. The Action Plan discussed during the Conclave was documented and is known as 'Surat Spiritual Declaration' (SSD).

The SSD Action Plan envisages "Five Garland Projects". The emphasis of four projects was on celebration of inter religious festivals, multi religious projects, healthcare, and employment, imbibing value based education in schools and encouraging interfaith dialogue among religious/spiritual heads. In order to pursue these in a sustained manner and to coordinate all activities, a national level independent and autonomous organization managed by religious/ spiritual leaders as well as scholars and enlightened Citizens was set up. This organization was named "Foundation for Unity of Religious and Enlightened Citizenship' (FUREC). FUREC was launched by the president Dr. A P J Abdul Kalam on the birthday of Acharya Mahapragya, 15 June 2004 at Rashtrapati Bhavan, New Delhi.

FUREC combines the objectives of the Surat Spiritual Declaration and president Dr. A P J Abdul Kalam's Vision 2020 and is a non-profit organization which was founded by 15 spiritual leaders.

== Spiritual practices ==
=== Meditation ===
Mahapragya himself is a great practitioner of meditation. He has also written extensively on these topics. He started practicing mantra and meditation with his initiation to monkhood. In his twenties he started delving deeper into meditation and realized his profound interest for it. He used to practice it for hours and hours. His experience of meditation resulted in formulation of Preksha meditation system.

He also practiced Mantra chanting daily and became a Mantra expert with rich experience in it. He said from his experiences, the practice of Mantra can help people in awaking their hidden powers. Mahapragya used to practice Yogasana, Pranayama to keep himself fit. Mahapragya observed silence (Mauna) for more than three hours during the evening hours. Mahapragya used to be very conscious of his daily activity and meditative during all his activities like walking, eating, etc.

=== Disciplines of monkhood ===
Mahapragya took five major vows as a part of initiation to monkhood at the age of ten. These Mahavrata are non-violence (Ahimsa), truth (Satya), non-stealing (Asteya), Chastity/Celibacy (Brahmacharya), and non-possession/non-attachment (Aparigraha). As a Jain Muni (monk), he traveled only on foot and could not make use of a vehicle unless and until he was incapable of walking. He did not eat or drink after sunset and before sunrise. He did not cook food but had to go out for alms. He accepted only vegetarian food. He did not own a house. He could not stay in a single place for long periods. He constantly had to change places and could only move into a house with the owner's permission. He did not possess any thing except for few basic items like clothes and a bowl for alms.

== Writing ==
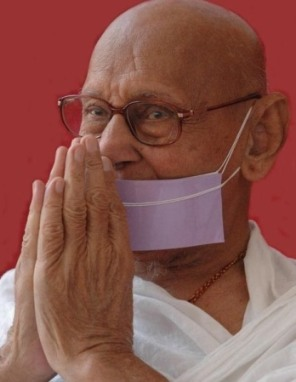
Acharya Mahapragya

Mahapragya started writing when he was 22 and did not cease until his death. He authored more than 300 books.

In his book Art of Positive Thinking, he explored the root causes of negative thoughts and provided a methodology for its transformation. Some other book titles include Towards Inner Harmony, I and Mine, Mind beyond Mind, Mysteries of Mind, New Man New World, Mirror of Self.

Mahapragya formulated Preksha meditation and wrote extensively on this topic. In these books he described various techniques of meditations and their effects on the psyche, physiology, hormonal influences, the endocrine system, and the nervous system.

He has done extensive work on Anekantavada, the philosophy of non-absolutism and relativity. He was a practitioner of this philosophy propounded by Lord Mahaveer which affirms that there is no problem that cannot be resolved with the application of Anekantavada. He showed ways how one can improve his thought process with Anekaant and use it for a peaceful life and co-existence. His book Anekanta The Third Eye discusses the details of the philosophy.

He has written many books on Jain Philosophy providing a serious material on Jain beliefs and vision. Jain darshan: manan and mimaansha is one of these creations and a research work in which Acharya Mahapragya elaborated numerous deep facets of the Jain belief system via a detailed interpretation. Another precise work is Philosophical Foundations of Jainism. Shraman Mahaveer is biographical work on Mahaveer. Mahapragya tried to depict Mahaveer through his experience and achievements in meditation. Sambodhi is a rhymic conservation between Lord Mahaveer and the prince-monk Megha Kumar, in which Mahaveer enlightens the later. Mahapragya wrote extensively on the lives and philosophies of Acharya Bhiksu and Acharya Tulsi.

Mahapragya made great contributions to Sanskrit through his poetry. He also wrote poems and bhajans in Hindi. Ashruvina, Mukulam in Sanskrit and Rishabhayana in Hindi are some of his poetic creations.

Acharya Mahapragya wrote with great clarity. His sentences are short and his style was direct. He only suggested, he never forced his view. He may have asserted his belief, but his language is conscious of relativity even in expression. He often resorted to the passive voice. As one of his translator's once said "Between one full stop and the next sentence, a kingdom can be built".

== Views ==
=== Stand on religion ===
Acharya Mahapragya says,

"The religion which does not bring about a change in a man's life, which does not impart peace to him, deserves to be thrown into the river Ganges rather than carried on as burden on one's shoulders. Rituals or idol worship alone are not enough unless one's conduct also gets transformed. Religion is not confined only to temples, mosques, or churches, but extends to the man's day-to-day living as well."

"I believe in that religion which has moral values at its foundation and spirituality at its peak. I don't believe in that religion that doesn't have moral values and spirituality. I accepted that religion which made me physically, mentally, emotionally healthy. Religion is beyond rituals. Religion has the ability to solve our problems if you believe in pure religion."

== Influence ==
Narendra Modi said:

"Acharya Mahapragya Ji gave the mantra of healthy individual, healthy society, healthy economy: PM Modi" "Acharya Mahapragya Ji used to say that if you leave 'me' and 'mine' then everything will be yours. His mantra, his philosophy was also clearly visible in his life: PM"

"As much as Acharya Mahapragya Ji has written about spirituality, with an equally broad vision he wrote on subjects like philosophy, politics, psychology and economic: PM Modi".

Ram Dhari Singh Dinkar said

"Mahapragya is a Modern Vivekananda. We have not seen Vivekananda, only heard and read about him. But now we can see Vivekananda through his Vision".

Indian Prime Minister Atal Bihari Vajpayee has often stated:

"I am a lover of Mahapragya’s literature". The Eminent Scholar of Philosophy, Dr. Daya Krishna has recognized Acharya Shri Mahapragya as the most knowledgeable person on the subject of Jain Logic.

The famous Bangla writer Bimal Mitra said:

"I find new truth in Mahapragya’s work. When I read his books, I feel as if I write for the masses and he writes for me. If only I could have met him in the initial stages of my career, my literature would have had a new path to follow".

Dr. A.L. Basham said:

"While meeting Acharya Mahapragya, one gets the thrill of meeting the 'Spiritual Ideal' or the 'Wonder that India was'".

== Awards and honours ==
- Mother Teresa National award of peace by Inter faith Harmony foundation of India in 2005
- Communal harmony award i.e. Sampradayika Sadbhavana Puraskar by Govt. of India in 2004
- Ambassador of Peace (London) by Inter Religions and international federation in 2003
- Lokmaharshi by New Mumbai Municipal corporation in 2003
- Indira Gandhi Award for National Integration in 2003
- D.Litt. by Netherland Inter Cultural Open University in 1999
- On the eve of Acharya Mahapragya's 88th birth anniversary all religious dharm guru's of KARNATAKA state honored as "DHARM CHAKRAVARTHI" IN 2007
- In 2008 "SARVA DHARM SAMMELANA" held at TOWN HALL, BANGALORE participated by all religious guru's felicitated Acharya Mahapragya as "VISHVA SHANTHI DOOT"

== Death ==
Acharya Mahapragya died on 9 May 2010 at 2:52 pm (aged 89) in Sardarshahar, in Churu district, the place where he gained monkhood. Subsequently, Acharya Mahashraman was chosen the 11th acharya of Jain Terapanth, previously Acharya Mahapragya had made Acharya Shri Mahashraman the Yuvacharya of the Terapanth sect at Gangashahar (Bikaner) in 1997.

== See also ==
- List of religious leaders in 2007
- List of Jains
- Sadhvi Kanakprabha
- Acharya Mahashraman
