= Siriyari =

Village in Pali (Rajasthan), India

- Village
- Location in Rajasthan, India Siriyari (India)
- Coordinates: 25.673261°N 73.808352°E
- Country: India
- State: Rajasthan
- District: Pali

Government
  - Body: Gram Panchayat

Population (2001)
  - Total: 13,500

Languages
  - Official: Hindi
- Time zone: UTC+5:30 (IST)
- PIN: 306027
- Telephone code: 02935
- Vehicle registration: RJ-22
- Sex ratio: 993 ♂/♀

Siriyari is a town in Pali district in the state of Rajasthan, India, on State Highway 62.

It was the death place of Acharya Bhikshu, who founded the Shwatambar Terapanth sect of Jainism, and it has a temple named for him.

== History ==
Siriyari was granted to Khet Singh Solanki, by his father Sawant Singh Solanki of Desuri. Raja Sur Singh of Jodhpur married to Khet Singh's daughter Rani Manorath Kanwar on 18 February 1594. Khet Singh, his son Sanga Singh died fighting for Mewar, in battles against Mughals.

Thakur Mahesh Das, son of Rao Kumpa of Marwar, was father of a son, Thakur Aas Karan, who was granted the estate of Digai in 1616. His eldest son, Thakur Amar Singh succeeded in Digai and won Siriyari from the Solanki Rajputs in a battle in 1635.
