= Akhil Bhartiya Terapanth Yuvak Parishad =

Indian non-profit organisation

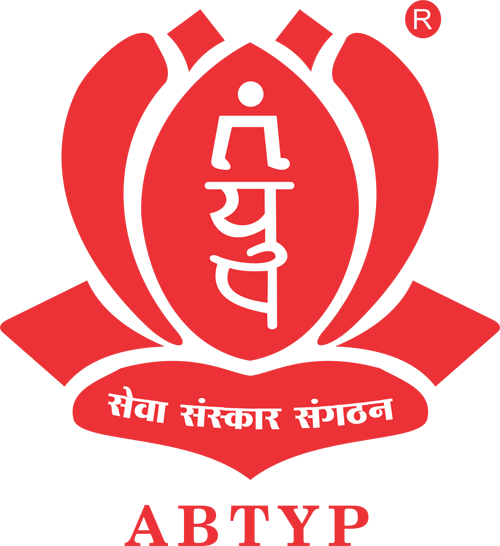
- Founded: 1964
- Founder: Acharya Tulsi
- Type: Non-profit organization
- Headquarters: Ladnun, Rajasthan
- Website: abtyp.org

Akhil Bhartiya Terapanth Yuvak Parishad (ABTYP) is a youth organization associated with the Terapanth Dharmsangh, a branch of the Jain community. Established in 1964 under the guidance of Acharya Tulsi, it is registered under the Society Registration Act (Registration No. 588/83-84, dated 30 March 1984). ABTYP operates across multiple locations in India and is registered with NGO Unique ID DL/2012/0048117.

== History ==
ABTYP was founded in 1964 with the goal of promoting ethical living, self-development, and social service within the Jain community. Established under the guidance of Acharya Tulsi, the organization is closely affiliated with the Terapanth Dharmsangh, a significant Jain sect. ABTYP's efforts have consistently focused on community welfare and youth empowerment.

== Objectives ==
The main objectives of ABTYP are to promote self-development, ethical living, and social service among the youth. The organization encourages the youth to adhere to Jain teachings and values, fostering a sense of community, service, and personal growth. ABTYP is dedicated to providing assistance in various areas such as healthcare, disaster relief, blood donation, and awareness programs.

== Affiliation ==
ABTYP is affiliated with the Terapanth Dharmsangh, a branch of the Jain community. The organization operates under the guidance of Acharya Mahashraman (present successor of Acharya Tulsi) and continues to follow Jain principles in all of its activities.

== Activities ==
ABTYP’s activities are primarily divided into three main categories: Sewa (Service), Sanskar (Values), and Sangathan (Organization).

== Sewa (Service) Projects ==
ABTYP runs Acharya Tulsi Diagnostic Centers (ATDC), which provide affordable medical tests, including Pathology, ECG, ultrasound, and X-ray, across 60 centers in India. The organization also organizes large-scale blood donation drives on a regular basis. one of the events recognized by the Guinness World Records. During the COVID-19 pandemic, ABTYP facilitated plasma donation through its Mega Blood Donation Drive initiative. In addition, ABTYP conducts organ and eye donation awareness programs and collaborates with the National Disaster Relief Force (NDRF) for disaster management training for youth through its Terapanth Task Force initiative. Other initiatives include the Acharya Tulsi Jain Hostel, Yuva Vahini, Choka Satkar, and Acharya Mahapragya Medicals. In July 2023, Akhil Bharatiya Terapanth Yuvak Parishad, India, set a record for the largest human Jain Flag formation. A total of 1085 Kishores’ from all over the country came together and stood in formation at Nandan Van in Mumbai, Maharashtra in the presence of H.H Acharaya Mahashraman to form the Jain Flag which measured 10000 Sqft.

== Sanskar (Values) Projects ==
ABTYP promotes values from Jain scriptures (Aagam) through its Samyak Darshan Karyashala workshops, held annually across India. The organization also offers a Confident Public Speaking workshop, designed to enhance public speaking skills globally. Through its Jain Sanskar Vidhi program, ABTYP encourages the practice of traditional Jain methods for ceremonies like weddings, birthdays, and inaugurations. The Barah Vrat program educates individuals about the 12 vows mentioned in Jain scriptures for those who do not adopt monkhood. Other initiatives in this category include Bhikshu Darshan Karyashala, Mantra Diksha, Samayik Sadhak, Yuva Diwas, and Tapoyagya.

== Sangathan (Organization) Projects ==
The Fit Yuva initiative promotes health and wellness through fitness workshops, yoga, and meditation. Sargam provides a platform for individuals to explore and develop singing talent. ABTYP also maintains an updated database of its members, including contact details and blood group information through its Data Management & Collection initiative.

== Achievements ==
ABTYP has been actively involved in community welfare projects. The organization holds the Guinness World Record for organizing the largest blood donation drive. Additionally, ABTYP facilitated plasma donations during the COVID-19 pandemic through its Mega Blood Donation Drive. The Acharya Tulsi Diagnostic Centers (ATDC) network has expanded to 60 centers, providing affordable medical services to underserved communities. The Terapanth Task Force has been instrumental in providing disaster management training to youth in collaboration with the National Disaster Relief Force (NDRF).
