= Acharya Tulsi =

Indian Jain religious leader

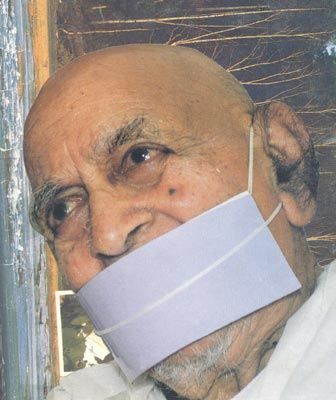
- Acharya Tulsi

Personal life
- Born: 20 October 1914 Ladnun, Rajasthan, India
- Died: 23 June 1997 (aged 82)

Religious life
- Religion: Jainism
- Sect: Śvetāmbara

Religious career
- Predecessor: Acharya Kalugani
- Successor: Acharya Mahapragya

Acharya Tulsi (20 October 1914 – 23 June 1997) was a prominent Jain religious leader. He was the founder of the Anuvrata movement and the Jain Vishva Bharti Institute, Ladnun, and the author of over one hundred books.

Acharya Mahapragya, Acharya Mahashraman and Sadhvipramukha Kanakprabha were his disciples.

== Biography ==
Acharya Tulsi was born on 20 October 1914 in Ladnun, in present Nagaur district of Rajasthan, to Vadana and Jhumarmal Khater. Acharya Kalugani, then the leader of the Śvetāmbara Terapanth association, greatly influenced Tulsi. Tulsi was initiated into monkhood at age 11 in 1925. In 1936, Kalugani nominated Tulsi to be his successor in Gangapur at Rang Bhawan-the house of Ranglal Hiran, making him the ninth Acharya of the Terapanth Sangha. During his leadership of the Sangha, he initiated more than 776 monks and nuns.

== Scholarship ==
In the 1970s, Acharya Tulsi began researching, compiling translations and commentaries on the Jain Agamas. Acharya Tulsi, along with Yuvacharya Mahapragya, sought to rediscover Jain meditation and termed it preksha dhyan.

== Anuvrat movement ==
In 1949 he launched the Anuvrat movement (anu = small, vrat=vow, Anuvratas are the limited version of the Mahavratas for the monks), based on the five Jain principles Truth, Nonviolence, Non possession, Non-stealing and Celibacy as applied in their limited version for the lay people. The movement encouraged people to apply the Anuvratas in their personal lives, even when dealing with non-religious aspects of the society. The movement also held that dharma is not for ensuring happiness in the future lives but also for achieving happiness in the present life.

The movement has continued under the leadership of his disciple Yuvacharya Mahapragya. He was raised to the rank of the acharya by Acharya Tulsi himself.

== Institutions ==
In 1948 Tulsi established the Parmarthik Shikshan Sanstha, a spiritual training centre for female aspirants who wanted to lead the Jain monastic lifestyle. Jain Vishva Bharati Institute, an education and research institute was established in 1991 with inspiration from Acharya Tulsi.

Traditionally Jain monks have been prohibited from travelling overseas. Tulsi developed the Saman Order around 1980 in an effort to spread the preachings of Jainism worldwide. This order follows the lifestyle of sadhus and sadhvis with two exceptions: They are granted permission to use means of transportation. They are allowed to take food which is prepared for them. This order can be termed as the link between the normal households and the Jain monks and nun.

== As a wandering ascetic ==
Jain monks and nuns remain under a vow of moving on foot all their life. In Tulsi's lifetime he covered more than 70,000 km. His major wanderings included:

- 1949: From Bikaner to Jaipur, Delhi, Haryana, Punjab and back to Rajasthan.
- 1955: From Rajasthan to Gujarat, Maharashtra, Madhya Pradesh and back to Rajasthan.
- 1958: From Rajasthan to Uttar Pradesh, Bihar, Bengal, again Bihar, Uttar pradesh, Delhi, Haryana and back to Rajasthan.
- 1966: From Rajasthan to Gujarat, Maharashtra, Tamil Nadu, Pondicherry, Kerala, Karnataka, Andhra Pradesh, Orissa, Madhya Pradesh and back to Rajasthan.
- 1974: From Rajasthan to Haryana, Delhi, Punjab, and back to Rajasthan.
- 1981: From Rajasthan to Haryana, Delhi and back to Rajasthan.
- 1987: From Rajasthan to Haryana and Delhi and back to Rajasthan.

In the course of these travels, Tulsi visited numerous communities and preached to Anuvrat-oriented life.

== Call for Jain unity ==
Acharya Tulsi proposed harmonious cooperation among various Jain sects. To this end, he supported Acharya Vinoba Bhave in the publication of Samana Suttam a book accepted by all sects.

== Recognition ==
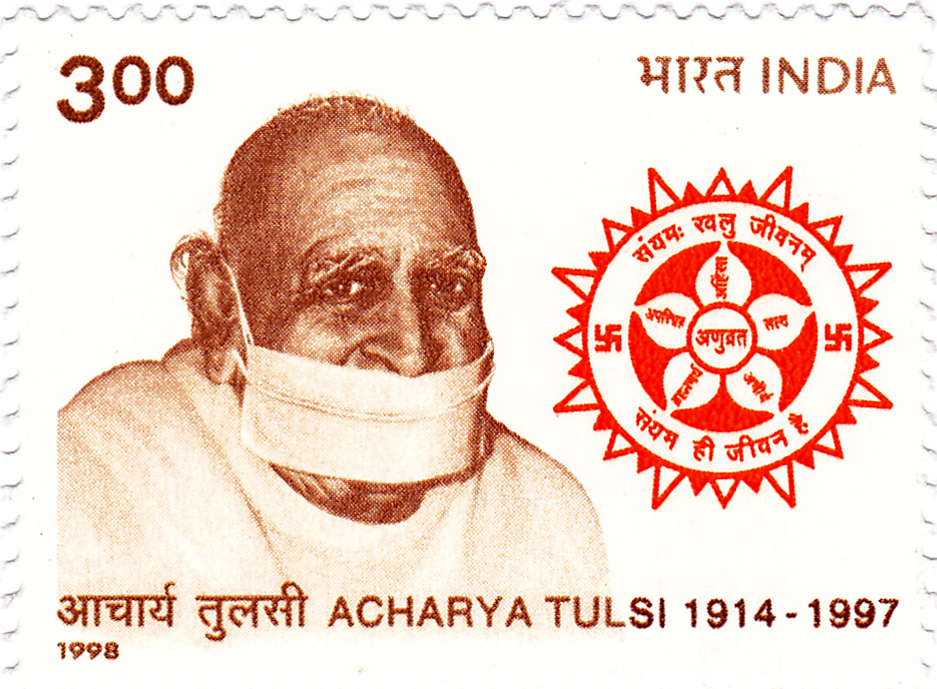
Acharya Shree Tulsi on a 1998 stamp of India

- Title of Yug Pradhan in 1971 by the President of India V. V. Giri
- Bharat Jyoti Award
- Vakpati Award
- The Indira Gandhi Award for National Integration in 1993
- A memorial named Mahashila Abhilekh has been erected in his memory in the village of Todgarh.
- Coins of denomination of five Indian rupees issued in 2013, on the centennial of Tulsi's birth.
- On 20 October 1998, the Vice President Krishan Kant released an Indian commemorative three-rupee postage stamp of Tulsi. Kant said that the Tulsi gave a new and contemporary direction to the high ideals of Jainism.
- Coins: In 2014, the Reserve Bank of India issued two coins featuring Acharya Tulsi, five rupees made of nickel-brass and 20 rupees. Finance Minister Shri P. Chidambaram released the commemorative coins to commemorate the birth centenary of Acharya Tulsi at Bikaner.
- Acharya Tulsi Marg: Salkia School Road, the most important road of Uttar Howrah, was renamed after the ninth Acharya Ganadhipati Acharya Tulsi of Śvetāmbara Terapanth Dharma Sangh on 9 February 2020. The programme was inaugurated by Cooperative Minister Arup Rai.

== Acharya Tulsi Award ==
- Acharya Tulsi Kartitva Puruskar is an honour bestowed by the All Indian Terapanth Mahila Mandal. This award acknowledges any notable contribution by any woman or organization of women in the fields of religion, women empowerment, science, education, literature, arts, cultural studies, administration, social welfare etc.
- This award was conceptualized in 2003 and till now awardees include Smt. Purnima Advani, the then president of Rashtriya Mahila Ayog, Smt. Kiran Bedi, the first woman IPS of India, Smt. Savitri Jindal, former member of Parliament of Haryana and a leading industrialist, and to Smt. Nilima Khaitan, the chief executive of Seva Mandir, Udaipur.
- Sumitra Mahajan, past speaker of the 16th Lok Sabha has been nominated as awardee for 2019 for her outstanding contribution to society. She has been elected to the Lok Sabha eight times, one of only three members to do so. She is also the longest serving woman member. In the 2014 general elections, she amassed 4,66,901 votes and won a seat by the highest margin of votes in Madhya Pradesh.

== See also ==
- Acharya Bhikshu
- Ladnu Jain temple
- Acharya Tulsi Regional Cancer Institute and Research Centre
- Jain Vishva Bharti Institute, Ladnun
- Akhil Bhartiya Terapanth Yuvak Parishad
- Akhil Bhartiya Terapanthi Mahila Mandal
- Acharya Tulsi Award Website
- List of religious leaders in 2007
- List of Jains
- Sadhvi Kanakprabha
