= Ladnu Jain temple =

Jain pilgrimage center located Rajasthan

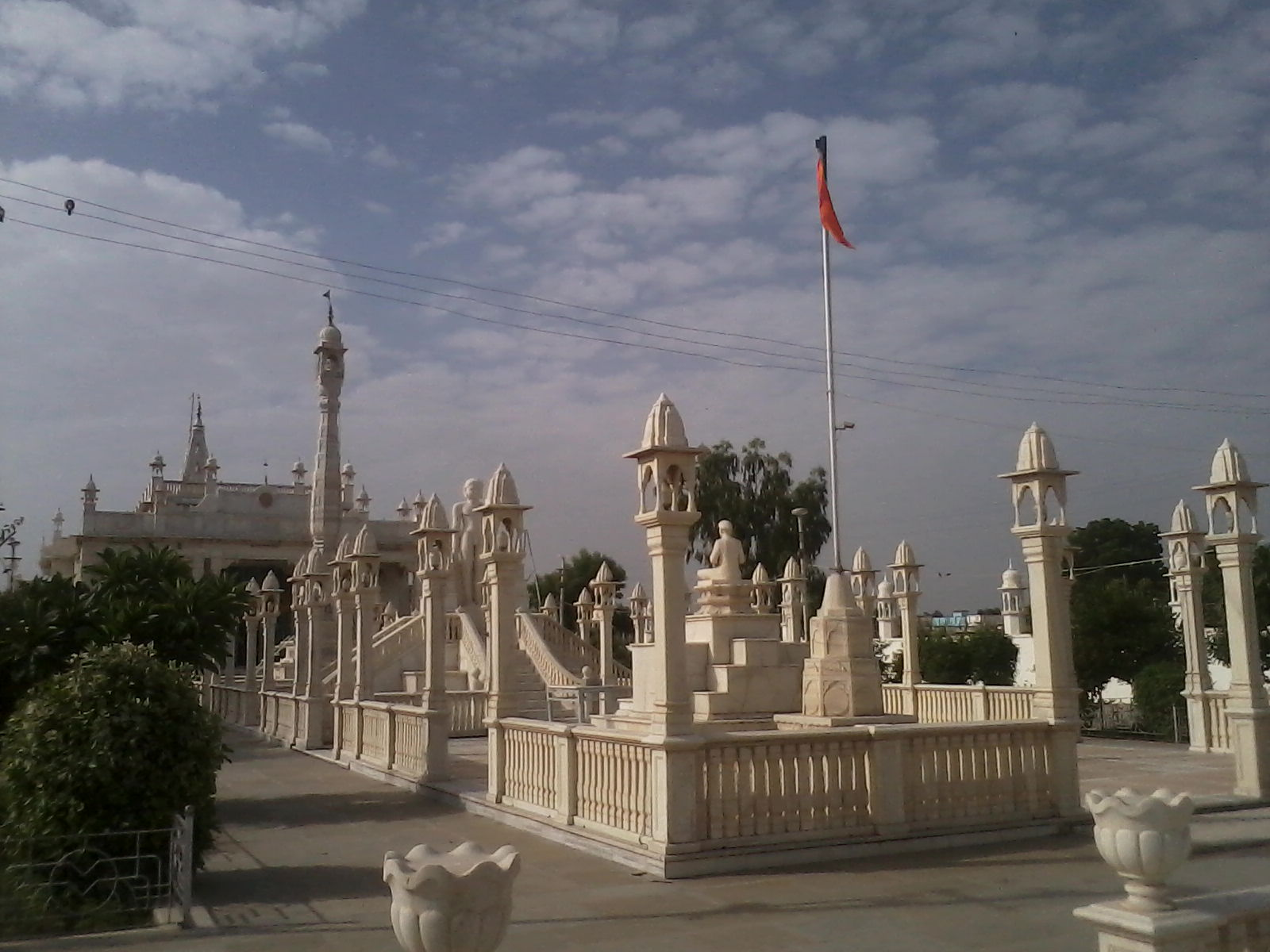
- Adinath Jain temple, Ladnun

- Location within Rajasthan

Religion
- Affiliation: Jainism
- Sect: Digambara, Śvetāmbara
- Deity: Shantinatha
- Festival: Mahavir Jayanti

Location
- Location: Ladnu, Rajasthan
- Interactive map of Ladnu Jain temple
- Coordinates: 27°38′29.0″N 74°23′38.4″E

Architecture
- Established: 10^{th} century

Ladnu Jain temple is a Jain pilgrimage center located in Ladnu, Rajasthan.

== History ==
Ladnu, established as a significant Jain center in the 10th century, features a temple complex comprising five Digambara and two Śvetāmbara temples, with their superstructure added during later centuries. The temple complex is home to Jain Vishva Bharati University, established in 1970, serving as a hub for the study of Jainism and spirituality.

Ladnu also holds significance as the birthplace of Acharya Tulsi, a ninth spiritual leader of Śvetāmbara Terapanth tradition.

== Architecture ==
The Shantinatha temple boasts an inscription dating back to 1295 CE (1352 VS) inscription carved on the pedestal of the mulnayak (principal) idol. Additionally, the temple is adorned with an exquisitely carved idol of Sarasvati, dating back to 1162 CE. Noteworthy among the temple's architectural features is the intricately carved torana, dating back to 1079 CE. The temple underwent expansion over time, incorporating bronze idols from 1518 to 1872.

The basement of the temple features charan (footprints) carved on a pillar, with lotus flowers adorning the bottom of the foot imprints.
