= Mauna (silence) =

Silence in Hindu philosophy

In Hindu philosophy, Mauna (Silence), which has a voice of its own, refers to peace of mind, inner quietude, Samadhi and the Absolute Reality. The Hindu texts insist upon proper understanding of silence by experiencing it through control of speech and practice.

== Background ==
Mauna (Sanskrit: मौनम्) or Maunitva (मौनित्व) means – silence, taciturnity, silence of the mind – as in मौनमुद्रा (the attitude of silence) and मौनव्रतम् (a vow of silence) or मौनिन् (observing vow of silence). A Sanskrit Dictionary gives many words such as – अनिर्वचनम् (silence, not uttering anything), अभाषणम् (silence, not speaking), अवचन (absence of assertion, silence, taciturnity), अव्याहृतम् (silence), निःशब्दम् (silence, a calm), - as referring to silence. Chambers Twentieth Century Dictionary gives the meaning of the word, Silence, as absence of sound; abstention from sounding, speech, mention, or communication; a time of such absence or abstention, taciturnity.

Kumarila lists sound as one of the eleven substances and as one of the twenty-four qualities, he does not include silence in any one of these two lists nor does he describe silence as he does sound.

== Understanding silence ==
Asat, the word meaning non-existent or indescribable, appears seven times in the Rig Veda); it differs from the word, Mithya, which means false or untrue, . Asat is the opposite of Rta. It is the ground of transcendence, the origin of all organized perception, the original ground any and all sounds count in order to sound, and is also called the language of non-Existence. In the sense of "non-Existence" or "inaction", Asat is simply silence; in the sense of "obscuring" or "covering" or "chaos, " it is pure noise downwards moving from which tone is a distillation (Rig Veda VII.104.1,10,11). Rta is the end of an effective synthesis of sensorium, through a whole range of clear and distinct acts of particular senses and their subsequent insights. Asat stands as the initial space-ground of indeterminate perception or of sets of organized perceptions, the sounding silence from which the worlds, gods and man emerge. Ramana Maharshi in the 6th paragraph of Nān Yār reminds us that only after firmly establishing our mind in our heart will our primal thought "I" which is the root of all thoughts disappear for the ever-existing real self to shine; the place (innermost core of our being) devoid of even a little trace of our primal thought "I" is svarupa (our own essential self) which alone is called mauna (silence), it is the state of egolessness.

== Experiencing silence ==
Kena Upanishad tells us - यद्वाचाऽनभ्युदितं येन वागभ्युद्यते – "That which is not uttered by speech that by which speech is revealed" (I.5), - यच्छ्रोत्रेण न शृणोति येन श्रोत्रमिदं श्रुतम् - "That which man does not hear with the ear, that by which man knows the ear", - तदेव ब्रह्म त्वं विद्धि नेदं यदिदमुपासते - "know that to be Brahman and not this that people worship as an object" (I.9). It is only when the knower is utterly negative and yet aware that the known conveys Its secret to him, that the process of knowing as emanating from the knower ceases, and that the interval between knowing and not knowing is not covered by any projection of the knower. The sensitive mind ready to receive the subtlest intimation of Brahman responds to the voice of silence. The mind liberated from even the attribute of sattva must stand in front of utter silence. Yajnavalkya insists that the spiritual man in order to experience Brahman must transcend both silence (mauna) and non-silence (amauna).

== Practice of silence ==
Anandmayi Ma once told 'Bhaiji', "If you desire to observe real silence, your heart and mind must fuse so closely, into one thought that your whole nature, inwardly and outwardly may freeze, as it were, into the condition of an inert stone. But if you merely want to abstain from speech, it is a different matter altogether."

Human knowledge suffers from the limitation of incompleteness but the Vedantic view of knowledge is rooted in self-revelation or self-luminosity. The truth of knowledge consists in its non-contradictedness and novelty, and not in mere correspondence or coherence. Metaphysical knowledge essentially implies permanent and changeless certitude. Nididhyasana with the aid of sravana (with a basis of the Mahavakyas) must precede knowledge. Sruti is the starting point of enquiry. Sraddha (Provisional belief), induced by Sabda or Agama (authoritative statements) and supported by Anubhava (experiences or realizations), is required to start an enquiry. Knowledge is truth and truth is the foundation of the Upanishads. Truthfulness in speech leads to truthfulness in spirit because in truth is initiation based. Truth is based on the heart, and reason is the true abode of truth. Satya or truth is a quality of speech and Dharma is the actualization of truth. Control of speech is not forced silence. Meditation is the practice of silence. The state of Samadhi is the boundless ocean of silence. Absorptive concentration is Samadhi. Superconscious trance is nirbija (seedless) because it is objectless and devoid of ignorance which is the seed of bondage. The dispositions of super-conscious trances, brought about by supreme detachment due to faith (which is purity of mind), overpower and counteract the dispositions of conscious trances, when these are destroyed along with the mind to merge in Prakrti, the pure self, liberated, abides in its essential nature and shines forth with its light of transcendental consciousness.

== Attribute-less Brahman denoted by silence ==
The attribute-less Brahman is explained sometimes by silence. In his commentary on Brahma Sutras III.ii.17, Sankara tells us that Bhadhva, questioned about Brahman by Bashkalin asked him to learn Brahman and became silent; on second and third questioning by Bashkalin he replied – " I am teaching you indeed, but you do not understand. Silence is that Self." The soundless Ardhamatra, that lingers after the three differentiated sounds of Pranava (Om) die away, is Turiya or Pure Consciousness, the attributeless Brahman (Mandukya Upanishad 12). The causal and the resultant conditions, the non-apprehension and misapprehension of Reality, do not exist in Turiya. Silence is Awareness, it is the Atman, the Self (Mundaka Upanishad II.ii.6) . The absolutistic interpretation is that silence is the genuine teaching about the ultimate Reality, because the Absolute is beyond the scope of speech and thought.

== Kaivalya ==
Samkhya and Yoga are dualistic systems; they treat Purusa and Prakrti as equally real entities even though absolutely opposed to each other. The concept of Kaivalya signifies that the aim of these systems is to secure an "aloneness" by severing all connections. The discriminating knowledge does cause the separation of Purusa from Prakrti but Prakrti remains intact to cause further bondage. Kaivalya is false transcendence achieved by cutting oneself off altogether from all manifestation and through the ushering in of a blissful silence. The true transcendence, too, is a state above all manifestation, but not aloof or away from transcendence. True transcendence is also silence, but not the silence that is opposed to movement or change because its inherent nature is not disturbed. True transcendence is not the silence of death benumbing the creative flow of life but the silence of which both death and immortality are equal shadows – यस्य च्छायामृतं यस्य मृत्युः (Rig Veda X.121.2). The true advaita never needs the excision of a second in order to achieve its non-duality. The Mimamsakas took the view that nothing but exhaustion of all actions can lead to liberation.

== Significance ==
Yama tells Naciketa (Katha Upanishad I.iii.13) that the discriminating mind should merge the organ of speech into the mind; he who has extracted and tasted the real essence enjoys true happiness in total silence and all alone united with the source and protecting it (Rig Veda I.79.3). Sankara explains this unity by citing Badhva's response to Bashkalin. The silence referred to by Badhva as the indescribable nature of Brahman is meant to be felt somewhere deep within. It is of far greater magnitude than mere looking into one's own mind, far more acute than even the sharpest intellect that can ever read into and decipher its codes. This silence compels the framing of questions, and by itself is the answer not merely in the sound of speech that covers it and reaches the ears. The letters of the alphabet and the words they constitute do not emit the sound or sounds they represent; the sounds they depict are of no value if there is no meaning attached. The silence spoken of by Badhva by itself speaks out most eloquently because it has a meaning attached to it; we are that meaning as also the interpretation of its subtleness. Rishi Ayasya (Rig Veda IX.46.2) prays –

परिष्कृतास इन्दवो योषेव पित्र्यावती |
वायुं सोमा असृक्षत ||

He states that having acquired the knowledge of the Highest the learned people easily unravel the deeply hidden meaning of the most subtle kind. The letters of the alphabet are the limiting adjuncts of the sounds they denote. The space that exists between two lines is the same that exists between sentences, between words and between letters making up those words. But this space denotes no sound; it is devoid of limiting adjuncts or barriers, the same as the Supreme Being who is a mass of Pure Consciousness devoid of limiting adjuncts. Thus, Space which is silent, unchangeable, eternal and infinite is Brahman. Silence is the Avyakta, the only reality whereas sound is the other Avyakta which is Maya or Prakrti that projects itself on account of its three qualities (gunas). Turiya is beyond utterance and is therefore called the Amatra. Sankara tells us that ignorance is the cause of all conditioned experiences, from the darkness of ignorance arises the sense of separateness, and an ignorant person is hardly aware of the continuous perception of Brahman.

== See also ==
- Monastic silence
- Hesychia
