= Acharya Tulsi Regional Cancer Institute and Research Centre =

Indian research institute

Coordinates: 28.011557°N 73.3252444°E

- Address: Bikaner, Rajasthan, India, 334003
- Location: Bikaner, Rajasthan, India

Acharya Tulsi Regional Cancer Institute and Research Centre is a cancer research institute in Bikaner, Rajasthan, India. It is the 13th Regional Cancer Centre in India.

== See also ==
- Acharya Tulsi
