= Tamkor =

- village
- Location within Rajasthan Location within India
- Coordinates: 28.441°N 75.252°E
- Country: India
- State: Rajasthan
- District: Jhunjhunu
- Tehsil: Malsisar
- Elevation: 278 m (912 ft)
- Time zone: UTC+5:30 (IST)
- PIN: 331026
- Rajasthan Assembly constituency: Mandawa
- MLA: Rita Choudhary
- Lok Sabha constituency: Jhunjhunu
- MP: Narendra kumar Khichar
- Sarpanch: Santosh Devi Soni

Tamkor is a small village in the Jhunjhunu district of Rajasthan in northwest India. Tamkor is also a birthplace of Acharya Shri Mahapragya, who was the tenth head of the Svetambar Terapanth order of Jainism.
