= Acharya Bhikshu =

Indian Jain spiritual leader (1726–1803)

Mahamahim Acharya Bhikshu Swamiji
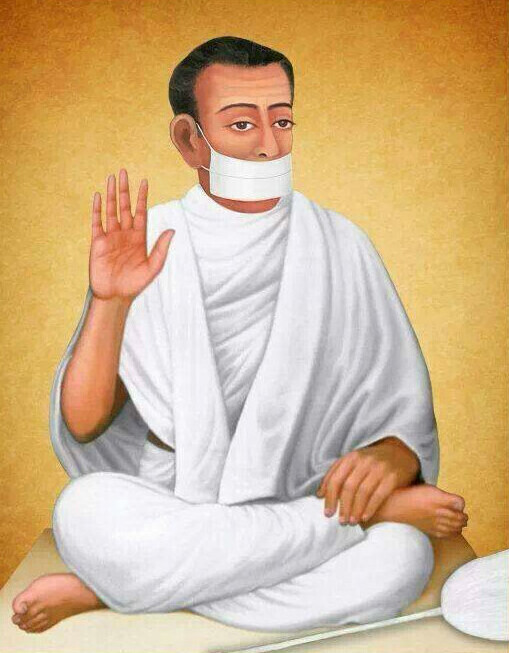

Personal life
- Born: 1 July 1726 Kantaliya, Rajasthan
- Died: 30 August 1803 (aged 77) Siriyari, Rajasthan

Religious life
- Religion: Jainism
- Founder of: Śvetāmbara Terapanth
- Sect: Śvetāmbara

Religious career
- Successor: Ācārya Bhārimāljī

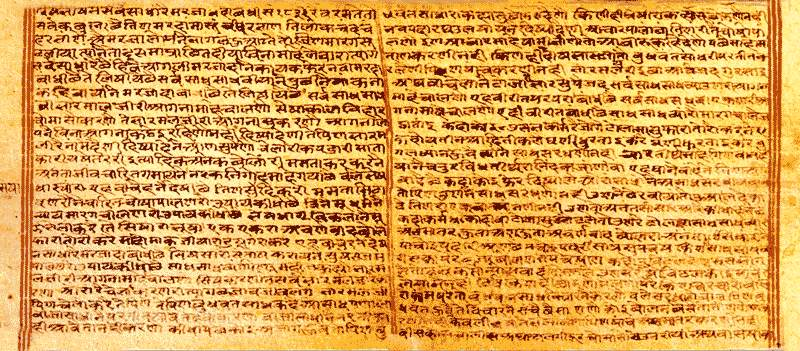
1st Page of Letter of Conduct written by Acharya Bhikshu

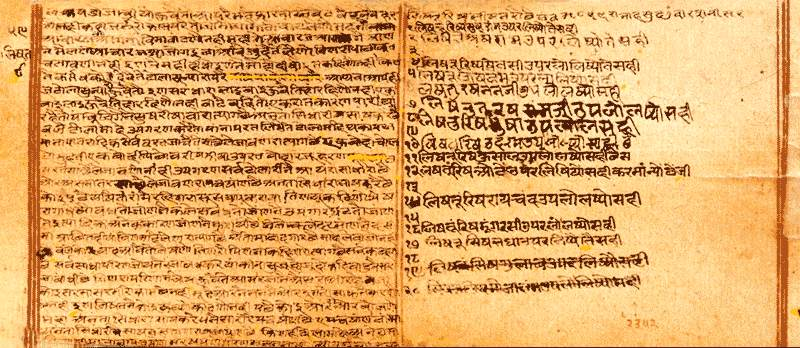
2nd Page of Letter of Conduct written by Acharya Bhiksu in Rajasthani language

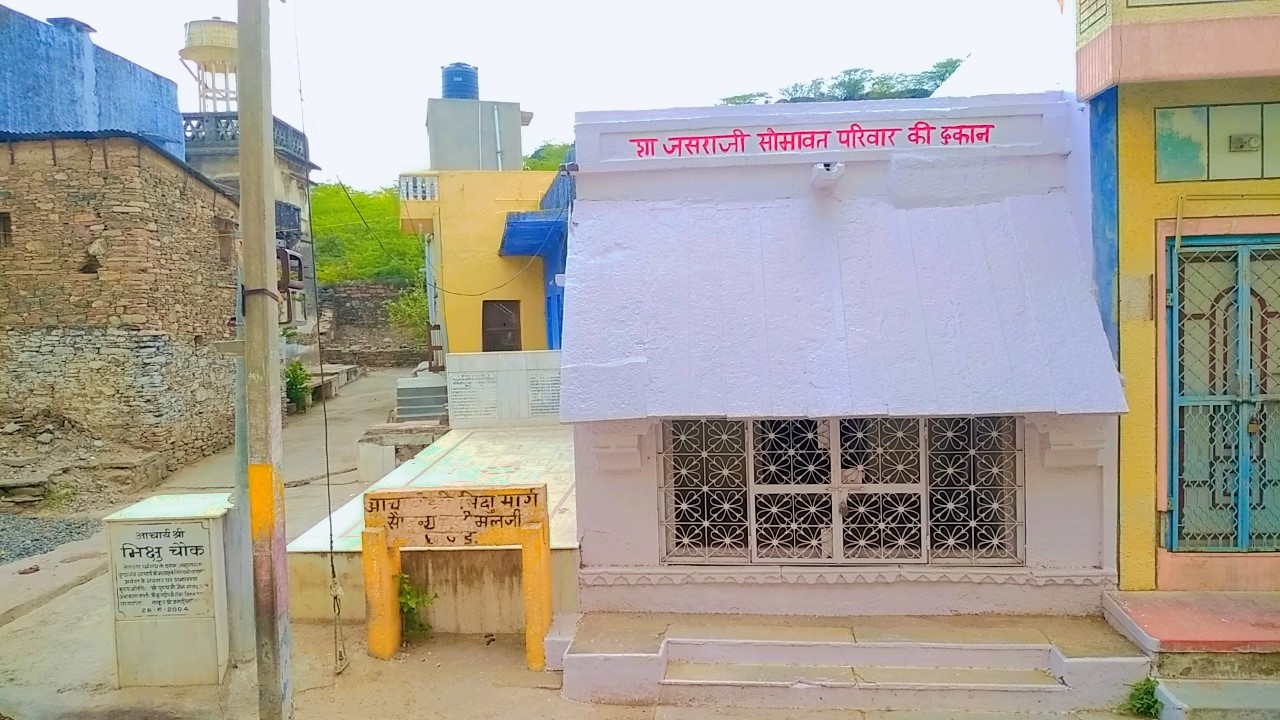
Pakki Haat, Siriyari - A historic place where Acharya Bhikshu resided during his last months of life

Acharya Bhikshu (1 July 1726 – 30 August 1803) was the founder and first spiritual head of the Śvetāmbara Terapanth sect of Jainism.

He was a devotee of Mahavira. In the initial phase of his spiritual revolution, he moved out from the group of Sthanakvasi Acharya Raghunath. That time he had 13 saints, 13 followers and 13 basic rules. This coincidence results in the name of "Terapanth" (Thirteen Path) and he referred it as "Hey Prabhu Yeh Terapanth".

== Life ==
Acharya Bhikshu (aka Bhikhanji) was born in Kantaliya in Rajasthan in 1726. He belonged to a merchant class named Bisa Oswal. He was initiated as a monk by a Sthanakvasi Acarya Ragunathji in 1751. Upon reading the scriptures, he found that the order of monks have wandered away from true teachings of Jainism; Ragunathji seconded the same but was unwilling to bring the same in the sect as they were hard to follow by the other monks.

== Postage stamp ==
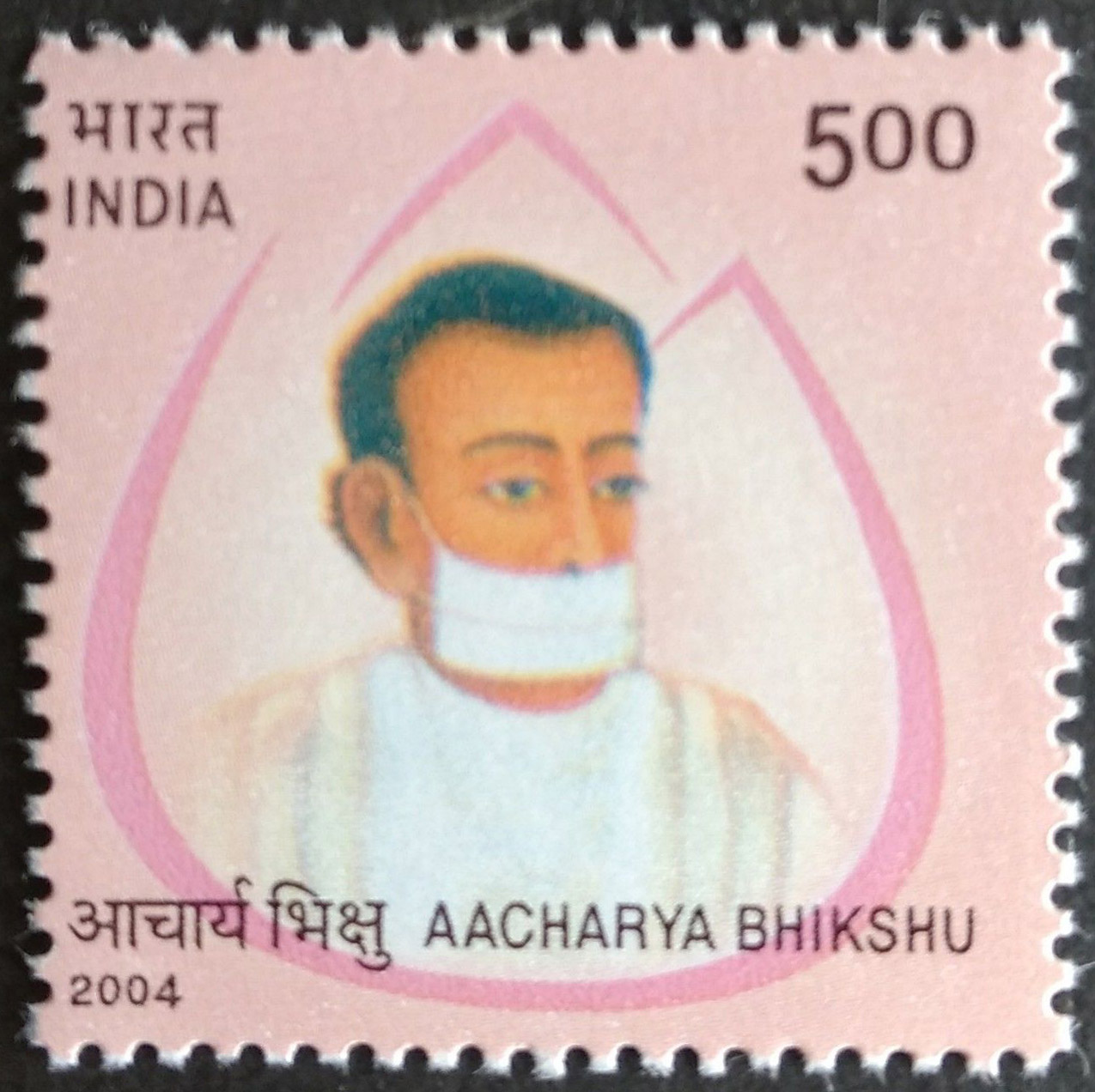
Acharya Bhikshu 2004 Stamp

On 30 June 2004, India Post issued an INR 5 commemorative postage stamp in memory of Acharya Bhikshu on the occasion of the bicentenary of his death.

== See also ==
- Jain Vishva Bharti Institute, Ladnun
