= Nirbīja =

Sanskrit word

Translations of nirbīja
- English: without seed
- Pali: nibbija

Nirbīja (Sanskrit; or Pāli: nibbija or nibija). Translated as without seed.

== Transliterations ==
Synonymic Sanskrit transliterations in contemporary use are nirbija, nirvija or nirviija.

== Etymology ==
The Sanskrit prefix nir- (from nih निः + sandhi -r-) means "without".

== Antonym ==
Sabīja, (Pali: sabbija, sabija) savija or saviija means "with seed".

== Mantra ==
The term "Bīja" carries the specific meaning of a syllable that is used as a mantra or otherwise as the object of meditation. Bīja can also mean any object of meditation.

== Contemplation ==
The term Nirbīja Samādhi refers to a specific type of Samādhi (Buddhism) or Samādhi. In Patañjali's Yoga Sutras it is said, "But these three inner limbs, saṃyama, are only external means compared to the samādhi 'without seed' " [Book 3, 7th and 8th Sutra].

Nirvikalpa Samādhi is related but not similar.

== Meditation without seed ==
Dhyana (Hinduism) or dhyāna, meditation, as a "seedless meditation".

The samādhi without seed is a concept used to indicate a spontaneously arrived at state of meditation or dhyāna, considered by Patañjali to be the ultimate goal of (rāja) yoga. In Patañjali's Yoga Sutras it is used to differentiate a spontaneously arrived at state of meditation or dhyāna. Meditation without seed is considered a likely, though unforeseeable, outcome of regularly and properly conducted meditation with object or seed (bīja).

Pantanjali seems to indicate that mastery of this state is the supreme end of Yoga. The mundane and observable effect may be the body's reaction to freedom from habitual mentation, amongst other health benefits.

The effect may be the body's reaction to freedom from habitual mentation. Yogic thinkers consider both attachment to, and avoidance of this state a very real danger to further advancement; although at the same time, it is the first and absolutely necessary step toward nirvāṇa. This condition may be arrived at as well without any kind of yogic training. As such it can be viewed as deriving from a temporary release from habitual thought patterns.

The term "Bīja" carries the meaning of a seed which can be any object of meditation.

== Links to yoga texts online ==
Yoga Sutras

Yoga Sutras in English: haryana-online.com sacred-texts.com hrih.hypermart.net santosha.com north-india.in upenn.edu theosociety.org dailyreadings.com sofiatopia.org

Yoga Sutras with Interlineaer Translation
