= Jain Vishva Bharati Institute =

Deemed university in Rajasthan, India

Coordinates: 27.6520321°N 74.3889932°E

Jain Vishva Bharati Institute जैन विश्व भारती संस्थान
- Motto: Nanassa Saramayaro
- Motto in English: Right conduct is the essence of right knowledge
- Type: Deemed
- Established: 1991; 35 years ago
- Chancellor: Arjun Ram Meghwal
- Vice-Chancellor: Bachharaj Dugar
- Spiritual head: Acharya Mahashraman
- Location: Ladnun, Rajasthan, India
- Campus: 60 acres
- Website: jvbi.ac.in

Jain Vishva Bharati Institute is a deemed university in Rajasthan.

== History ==
JVBI was established with the inspiration of Acharya Tulsi, the 9th Head of the Jain Svetambar Terapanth religious sect, in Ladnun, Dist Nagaur, Rajasthan.

In March 1991, Government of India notified JVBI as "Deemed University" under Section 3 of University Grants Commission Act, 1956. The Institute continues to be housed in the common campus of its parent body organization Jain Vishva Bharati. Acharya Tulsi remained its first constitutional Anushasta (moral and spiritual guide) followed by Acharya Mahapragya as its second Anushasta. Acharya Mahashraman is its present Anushasta.

== Campus ==
The institute is in Ladnun, in Didwana-Kuchaman district of Rajasthan. This university is "A" grade Accredited by NAAC affiliated to UGC, AICTE, BCI, and MHRD.

== Academics ==
=== Regular Courses ===
JVBI undertakes various graduate and post-graduate Regular Programmes as well as doctorate and post-doctorate programmes, such as D.Lit. & Ph.D. Programmes in Jainology and Comparative Religion & Philosophy; Prachya Vidya evam Bhasha (Sanskrit, Prakrit); Yoga and Science of Living; Nonviolence and Peace; Social Work; Education; and English; M.Phil. Programmes in M.Phil. in Jainology and Comparative Religion & Philosophy; M.Phil. in Prakrit; and M.Phil. in Nonviolence and Peace; Master's degree Courses in M.A./M.Sc. in Jainology; Philosophy; Sanskrit; Prakrit; Hindi; Yoga and Science of Living; Clinical Psychology; Nonviolence and Peace; Political Science; Social Work; English; M.Ed.; Bachelor's degree Courses in B.A. (Bachelor of Arts); B.Com. (Bachelor of Commerce); B.Lib.I.Sc. (Bachelor of Library & Information Science); B.Ed. (Bachelor of Education); B.A.-B.Ed. 4 Yrs Integrated Course; B.Sc.-B.Ed. 4 Yrs Integrated Course; PG Diploma Courses in Jain Studies; Preksha Yoga Therapy; NGO Management; Rural Development; Corporate Social Responsibility; HR Management; Gender Empowerment; Counseling and Communication; Banking; Diploma in Naturopathy; Rajbhasha Studies; Certificate Courses in Prakrit; Sanskrit, Yoga and Preksha Meditation; SOL, PM & Yoga Education; Nonviolence and Peace; Journalism & Mass Media; Office AUtomation and Internet; Photoshop; and HTML-Web Designing.

=== Distance Education Courses ===
JVBI undertakes various post-graduate, graduate and certificate courses, i.e. Master's degree Courses in Jainology; Yoga and Science of Living; Education; Hindi; English; Nonviolence; Bachelor's degree Courses in B.A. (Bachelor of Arts); B.Com. (Bachelor of Commerce); B.Lib. & I.Sc. (Bachelor of Library & Information Science); BPP (Bachelor Preparatory Programme); Certificate Courses in Training in Nonviolence; Understanding Religion; Jain Religion & Philosophy; Prakrit; Jain Art and Aesthetics; Human Rights; and Training Programme Preksha Life Skill.

== Faculty ==
Professor B.R. Dugar, Professor Dept of Nonviolence and Peace is the current Vice Chancellor.

== See also ==
- Ladnu Jain temple
