= Mahashraman =

Indian Jain monk

Acharya Acharya Mahashraman
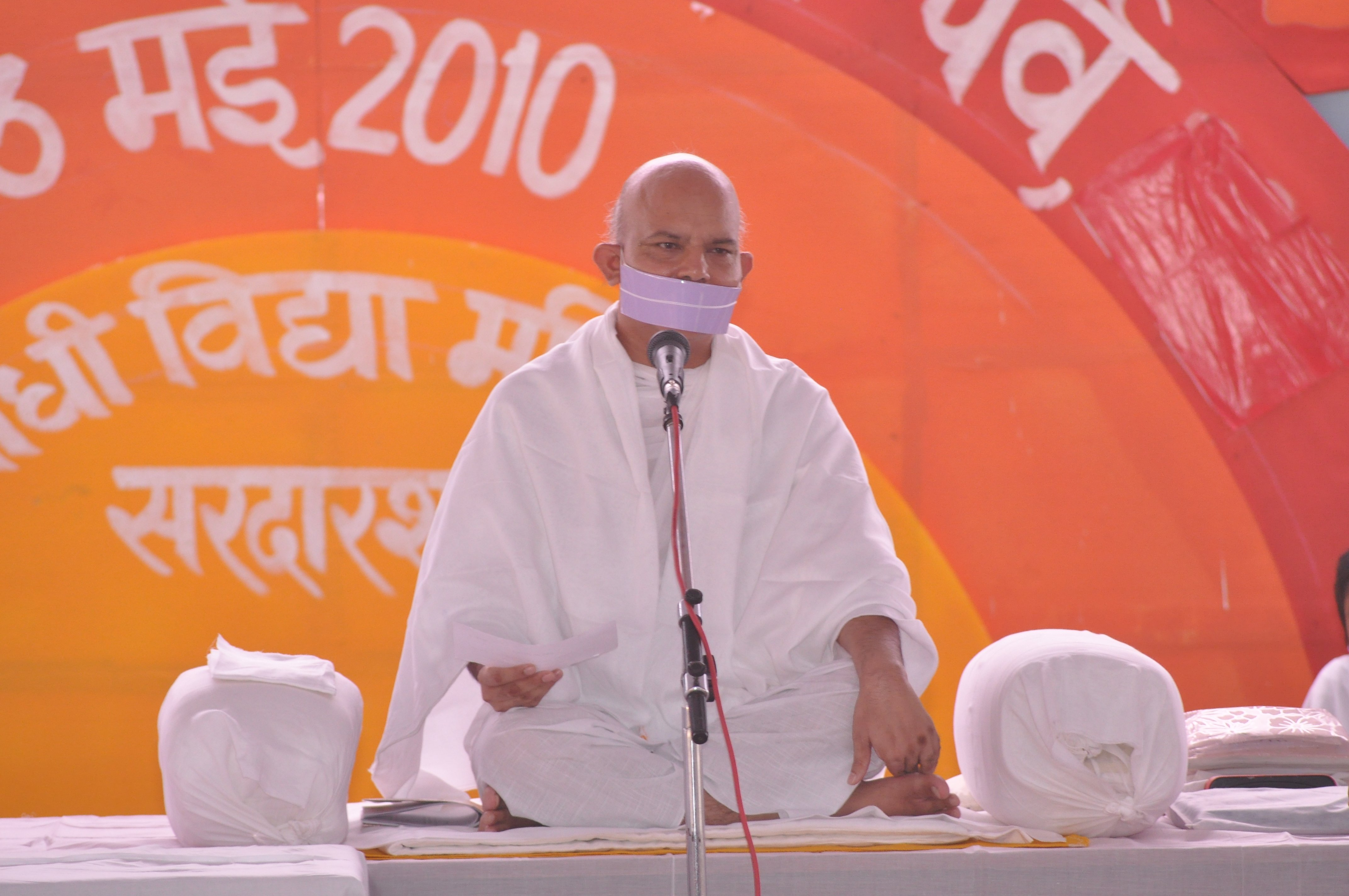
- Jain Shwetambar Terapanth's 11th Acharya Mahashramanji
- Official name: Acharya Mahashraman

Personal life
- Born: Mohan Jhumarmal Dugar; 13 May 1962 (age 64) Sardarshahar, Rajasthan
- Parent(s): Jhumarmalji and Nemadevi Dugar
- Notable works: Anuvrat Movement, Preksha Dhyan and; Tri-Nation Ahimsa Yatra — covering India, Nepal, and Bhutan covering more than 55000 KM on foot (as of 28th Jan 2021)

Religious life
- Religion: terapanth,Jainism
- Sect: Shwetambar Terapanth
- Initiation: Muni Mudit Kumar; 5 May 1974; Sardarshahar, Rajasthan by shasan stambh Mantri Muni Shri Sumermalji (Ladnun)

Senior posting
- Predecessor: Acharya Mahapragya
- Successor: Yuvacharya Mahaveer Muni

Acharya Mahashraman (IAST: Ācārya Mahāśramaṇa; born 13 May 1962) is the eleventh Acharya, supreme head of Jain Śvetāmbara Terapanth sect. Mahashraman heads all activities functioning under Terapanth organisation, most notably Anuvrat, Preksha Meditation, Jeevan Vigyan (Science Of Living). All the Terapanth sub-organisations, notably. Jain Vishva Bharati, Terapanth Mahasabha, etc. are working under the guidance of Acharya Mahashraman. His views are liberal and secular. He has a firm conviction to promote nonviolence, moral values and principles.

== Biography ==
=== Early life ===
In Rajasthan, Acharya Mahashraman was born on 13-May 1962 (Vaisakha Shukla navami) i.e. 13-May 1962 in Sardarshahar, Churu. His real name is Mohan Dugar. His parents were Nemadevi and Jhumarmalji. He was the seventh child among his eight siblings. He lost his father at the early age of seven. An unexpected emptiness entered the family. The absence of his father was made up by his mother's love and affection. She taught him good moral values and gave him a good education. As a result, he was inclined towards spirituality and religion.[8][9]

In spite of knowing that it is a difficult path, he did not change his mind. His feeling of detachment increased day by day. As time passed, he expressed his feelings before Acharya Tulsi. At that time Acharya Tulsi was in Delhi to celebrate 2500 years of Tirthankar Mahavira's Nirvana Kalyanaka. Acharya found him capable for initiation and after due investigation, he approved for his initiation in Sardarsahar by Muni Sumermal.

At the age of 12, he was initiated by Muni Sumermal on Sunday on V.S. 2031 Vaishaka Shukla Chaturdashi i.e. 5 May 1974. His entire life changed after initiation not only externally but also internally. Study of scriptures and practice of meditation became a part of his life. At that time, his daily routine was to refrain from unnecessary talk and to memorize sutras. He avoided all sorts of deviations and loved being alone. During study period, he learnt various languages like Sanskrit, Prakrit, Hindi and English. Sometimes he stayed with Ācārya Tulsi and at times had an independent journey too. He continued to stay with Ācārya Tulsi from Bidasar Maryada Mahotsav, i.e., from Vikram Samvat 2040.

In Vikram Samvat 2042 (1986 A.D.) Maagh shukla saptami (16 February 1986), on the occasion of Maryada Mahotsav in Udaipur, Acharya Tulsi asked him to assist Mahapragya in his internal works.

== Spiritual endeavors ==
In the year Vikram Samvat 2043 Vaishakha Shukla Chaturthi (14 May 1986), on the eve of Akshaya Tritiya, he became group leader in Beawar. "In the year 2046 Bhaadrav Shukla Navami (9th of September 1989), he was appointed as Mahashraman in "Yogakshema Varsha" (keeping knowledge ever expanding). This post was newly inaugurated. He was highly acclaimed after the post of Yuvacharya. In the process of Vikaas Yatra, Mahashraman had proceeded with four independent yatras. The first yatra was completed in the year 1990 from February to March which started from Ladnun, Sardarshahar via Dungargarh and ended at Chhoti Khatu.

The second independent movement started in the year 1990 from November to December, after Pali Chaaturmas. This Yatra started in Sivaanchi Maalaani and was completed on Sojat road via Rani station on 10 January 1991. After completion of his yatra, Ācārya Tulsi instructed that if he was found leading a luxurious life, he should do meditation for three long hours in standing posture. Muni Mudit was so humble that he at once accepted his orders without complaining.

His third Vikaas yaatra started in the year 1994-1995 on 25 November to 4 January after Delhi Chaturmas in surrounding areas.

His fourth Anuvrat Preksha Yatra started on 17 February 2000, from Taranagar to Ganganagar via Sardarshahar, Dungargarh and ended in Bidasar on 11 June 2000. This Yatra was more effective than the previous ones.

=== The Tri-Nation Ahimsa Yatra (2014-2022) ===
Acharya Mahashraman had started his Tri-Nation Ahimsa Yatra to advance the cause of non-violence with the aim of promoting harmony and brotherhood, escalating moral values and movement towards de-addiction. It was an endeavour to awaken a new faith in the infinite power of non-violence He had covered more than 50000 KM on foot in the Yatra which covered three countries (viz. India, Nepal and Bhutan) and 23 states of India.

The Yatra started from the Red Fort, New Delhi, in the year 2014, to Nepal in 2015 covering Uttarakhand, Uttar Pradesh, Bihar, and Jharkhand, Guwahati in 2016 covering West Bengal, Sikkim, Bhutan, Meghalaya, and Nagaland, Kolkata in 2017 covering Orissa, and Andhra Pradesh, Chennai in 2018 covering Tamil Nadu and Kerala, Bengaluru in 2019 and Hyderabad 2020. His Ahimsa Yatra was ended in New Delhi on 27 March 2022 at Talkatora Stadium.

On,28 January 2021, Acharya Mahashraman, the 11th Acharya of Terapanth Dharmasangha, the pioneer of Ahimsa Yatra, crossed the 50,000km mark and created a new history by marching through his holy steps. In today's era full of material resources, where there are so many modes of transport, there are arrangements, still keeping the Indian Sage tradition alive, Acharya Mahashraman is making a continuous march for public service. From the figures, this Yatra is 125 times bigger than Mahatma Gandhi's Dandi March and 1.25 times more than the circumference of the earth. If a person undertakes such a padyatra, he can travel more than 15 times from the northern end of India to the southern end or from the eastern end to the western end.

Even before the start of the Ahimsa Yatra, Acharya Mahashraman had traveled about 34,000kms on foot for the purpose of self-welfare. He has visited Delhi, Uttar Pradesh, Haryana, Punjab, Gujarat, Rajasthan, Madhya Pradesh, Bihar, Assam, Nagaland, Meghalaya, West Bengal, Jharkhand, Orissa, Tamil Nadu, Karnataka, Kerala, Pondicherry, Andhra Pradesh, Telangana, Maharashtra and Chhattisgarh and traveled to Nepal and Bhutan to inspire people to walk on the path of virtue by training meditation, yoga etc., it also paved the way for the sophistication of their misdeeds. He emphasized the change of heart, also trained the public through various seminars, and workshops during his visit. With his inspiration, millions of people irrespective of caste, religion and class have accepted the pledge of goodwill, morality and de-addiction in this long non-violence journey.

The closing ceremony of the Ahimsa Yatra which has been going on for the last eight years under the leadership of Acharya Mahashraman was held in Delhi on 27 March 2022 at Talkatora Stadium, in which many saints, Union Ministers, MPs, litterateurs, journalists, Social workers and non-violence workers participated.

On this occasion, the Prime Minister of India Shri Narendra Modi virtually addressed the "Ahimsa Yatra Sampannata Samaroh Karyakram" virtually and congratulated for completing the 18,000-kilometer "padyatra" in three countries. His full speech of 11 minutes and 5 seconds can be found on, PM Narendra Modi's Address at Ahimsa Yatra Sampannah Samaroh Karyakram and English rendering of PM’s address at Ahimsa Yatra Sampannata Samaroh Karyakram.

In his speech, The Prime Minister recalled the centuries-old tradition of Indian saints "चरैवेति–चरैवेति" that "emphasizes constant movement". The Prime Minister lauded the Acharya for expanding the tradition of "Vasudhaiva Kutumbakam" and propagating the mantra of ‘Ek Bharat Shreshtha Bharat’ as a spiritual pledge. He also recalled his long association with the "Shwetambara Terapanth" and his earlier statement that “Ye Terapanth hain, Ye Mera Panth hain" ("This Terapanth is My Path (way of life)). He emphasized the importance of the Ahimsa Yatra that started from the Red Fort in 2014 and noted the coincidence that he himself started his new journey as Prime Minister of India in the same year. He said real self-realization is possible only in the absence of any kind of addiction. He noted that lakhs and lakhs of people took up the resolution of de-addiction in the Ahimsa Yatra. He further said that when there is a realization of the Self, only then the "स्वयं में सर्वम्" is realized. Only then do we realize our duties for charity by rising above selfishness.

== Successor to Acharya Mahapragya ==
In the year Vikram samavat 2054 Aashadha Badi Teej (23. June 1997) Acharya Tulsi died at Gangashahar in Terapanth Sabha Bhavan. As a result, Acharya Mahapragya announced the post of Yuvacharya, in the year Vikaram samvat 2054 Bhaadrva Shukla Baaras (14 September 1997) in the presence of about fifty thousand people. He announced the name of Mahashraman as the next successor of Terapanth. He was appointed as Yuvacharya of Terapanth. This was appreciated by all the people. At that time, his age was 35.

On 9. May 2010, Mahapragya died in Sardarshahar. Mahashraman was announced as the 11th Acharya of Terapanth sect. On 23 rd of May 2010, he enthroned officially the post of Acharya amidst a huge audience in Gandhi Vidya Mandir of Sardarshahar.

== Influences ==
Pratibha Patil said, “You are also working for Women's development and environment protection. Greeting your excellent, serene and legislative authorship, we request your cooperation in creating a peaceful society globally.” He has also received congratulations from Ex-President of India, Pranab Mukherji.

Acharya Mahashraman's book "Vijayi Bano" was released by President Pranab Mukherjee on 10 July 2013. The then Chief Minister Ashok Gehlot was also present on that occasion.

Impressed with his noteworthy efforts, Pacific University conferred him with the title ‘Shantidoot’ ("Ambassador of Peace") at the "World Dharmguru Sammelan" in Udaipur, Rajasthan on May 29. Pratibha Patil, the Ex-President of India who graced the occasion with her presence, lauded the efforts of Acharya Mahashraman. Indian Digambar Jain Pilgrimage Committee has adorned him as "Shraman Sanskriti Udgata".

Narendra Modi on March 27, 2022 addressed the 'Ahimsa Yatra Sampannata Samaroh Karyakram' of Shwetambar Terapanth virtually and congratulated Acharya Mahashramanji for completing 18,000-kilometer padyatra’ in three countries. His full speech of 11 minutes and 5 seconds is available at, PM Narendra Modi's Address at Ahimsa Yatra Sampannah Samaroh Karyakram and English rendering of PM’s address at Ahimsa Yatra Sampannata Samaroh Karyakram.

== Books ==
- Aao Hum Jeena Sikhe (Let’s Learn to Live)
- Kya Kehta Hai Jain Vangmay
- Dukh Mukti ka Marg
- Samvad Bhagwan Se
- Mahatma Mahapragya
- Dhammo Mangal Mukhittam
- Sukhi Bano
- Adrishya Ho Gaya Mahasurya

== See also ==
- Acharya Tulsi – Jain Acharya
- Acharya Mahapragya- Jain Acharya
- Sadhvi Kanakprabha
- List of Jains
