= Śvetāmbara Terapanth =

Sect of Jainism

Terapanth Dharamsangh's Official Emblem

Śvetāmbara Terapanth (तेरापंथ धर्मसंघ (श्वेतांबर) is a sect of the Śvetāmbara Jainism that was founded by Acharya Bhikshu in Vikram Samvat 1817. Acharya Bhikshu believed in strict adherence to the canonical code of conduct for ascetics as prescribed by (Lord )bhagwan Mahavira. Acharya Bhikshu rigorously followed the principles and thus set an example for all to follow. He showed the way for the life of discipline, purity and self-control.

He opposed the contemporaneous laxity in the conduct of the ascetics of the Sthanakvasi sect and suggested reformation, but his suggestions were not well received by his colleagues and his guru, Acharya Raghunathji.

Due to the conflict, Acharya Bhikshu, along with a few monks who supported his views, separated from Acharya Raghunathji at Bagadi (Marwar) in Vikram Samvat 1817 (28 June 1760), Chaitra Shukla Navami. This marked the beginning of the Śvetāmbara Terapanth.

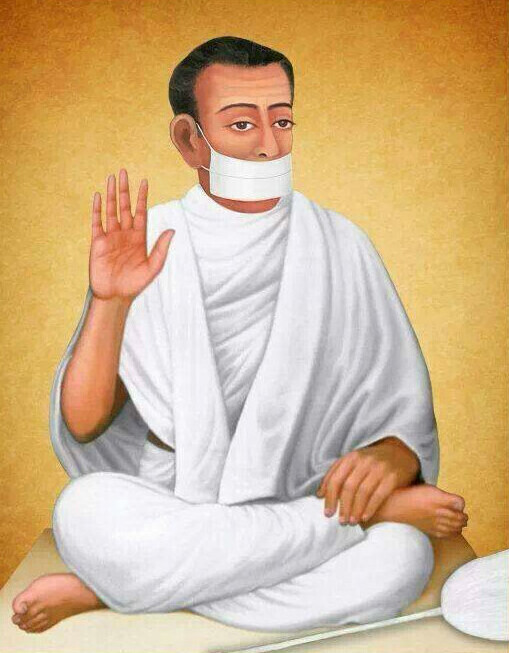
Acharya Shri Bhikshu, the founder and first spiritual head of Śvetāmbara Terapanth

The Terapanth religious sect is known for its finely organized structure which operates under the complete direction of one Acharya, who serves as the supreme head of the order. With a history of over 200 years, the sect has had only eleven Acharyas, with the current supreme head being Acharya Shri Mahashraman ji, who is the eleventh Acharya. The sect consists of over 850 monks, nuns, Samans, and Samanis (a rank between ascetics and lay-followers) who adhere to strict codes of discipline, and has millions of followers worldwide. The sect emphasizes non-violence, vegetarianism, and strict adherence to the canonical code of conduct for ascetics. The sect's followers are called Terapanthis, and they have a strong tradition of seva (selfless service) and sadhana (spiritual practice).

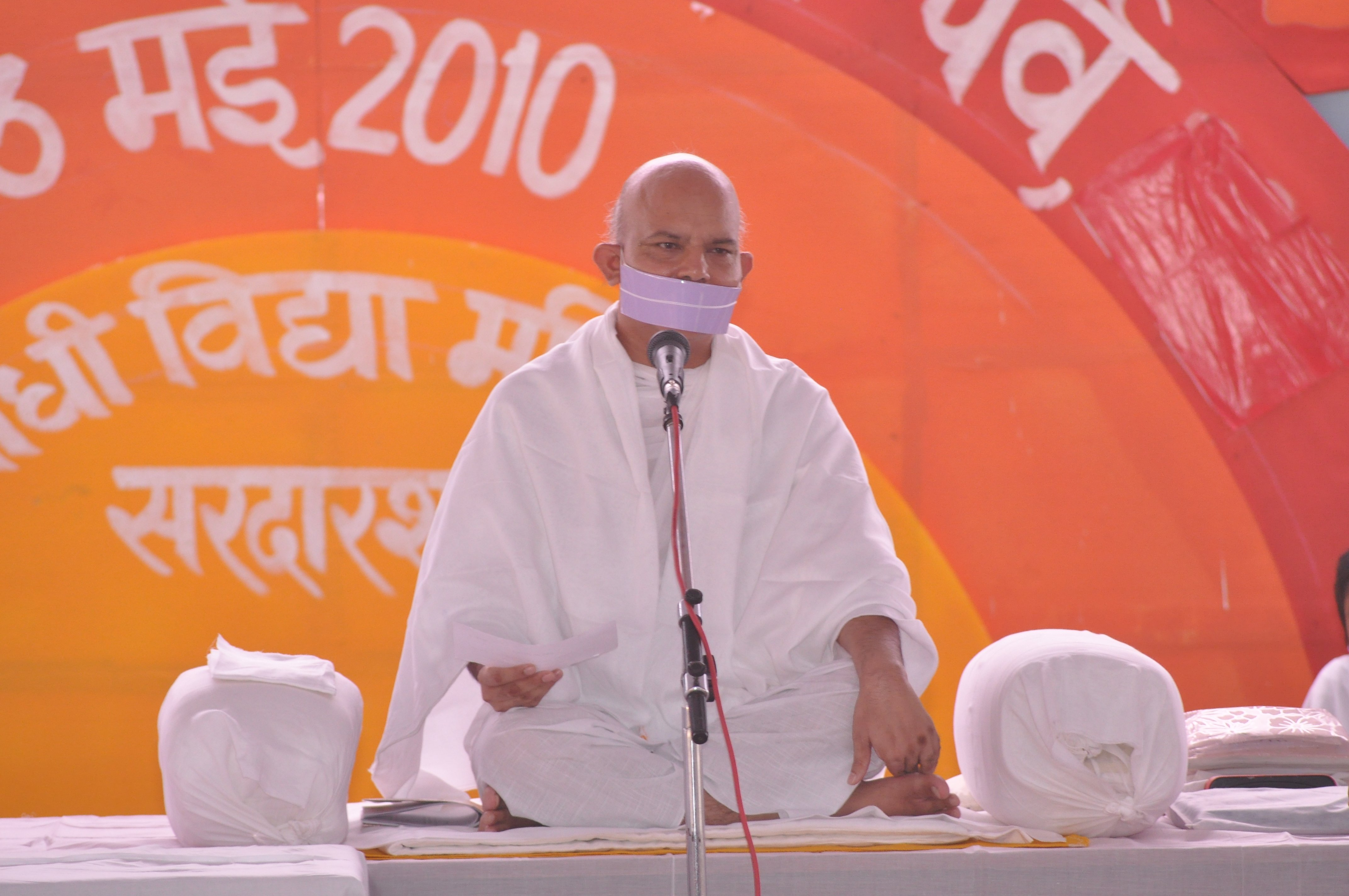
Śvetāmbara Terapanth's 11th Acharya Shree Mahashramanji

The Terapanthi monks and nuns follow a strict discipline that includes celibacy, non-possession, non-violence, truthfulness, and meditation. They lead a simple lifestyle, wear white robes and wear a muhapatti (a square of white cloth) over their face. The sect also encourages the practice of ahimsa (non-violence) towards all living beings.

The Terapanthi community has a significant presence in Rajasthan, Gujarat, Maharashtra, and Madhya Pradesh in India. The Terapanthi order is strict in its non-idolatrous approach, which means that they do not worship or believe in the use of idols for religious purposes. Instead, they focus on the importance of self-control, self-discipline, and meditation and have lakhs of followers in many parts of the world including Nepal, the United States, Canada, and the United Kingdom.

== Nomenclature ==
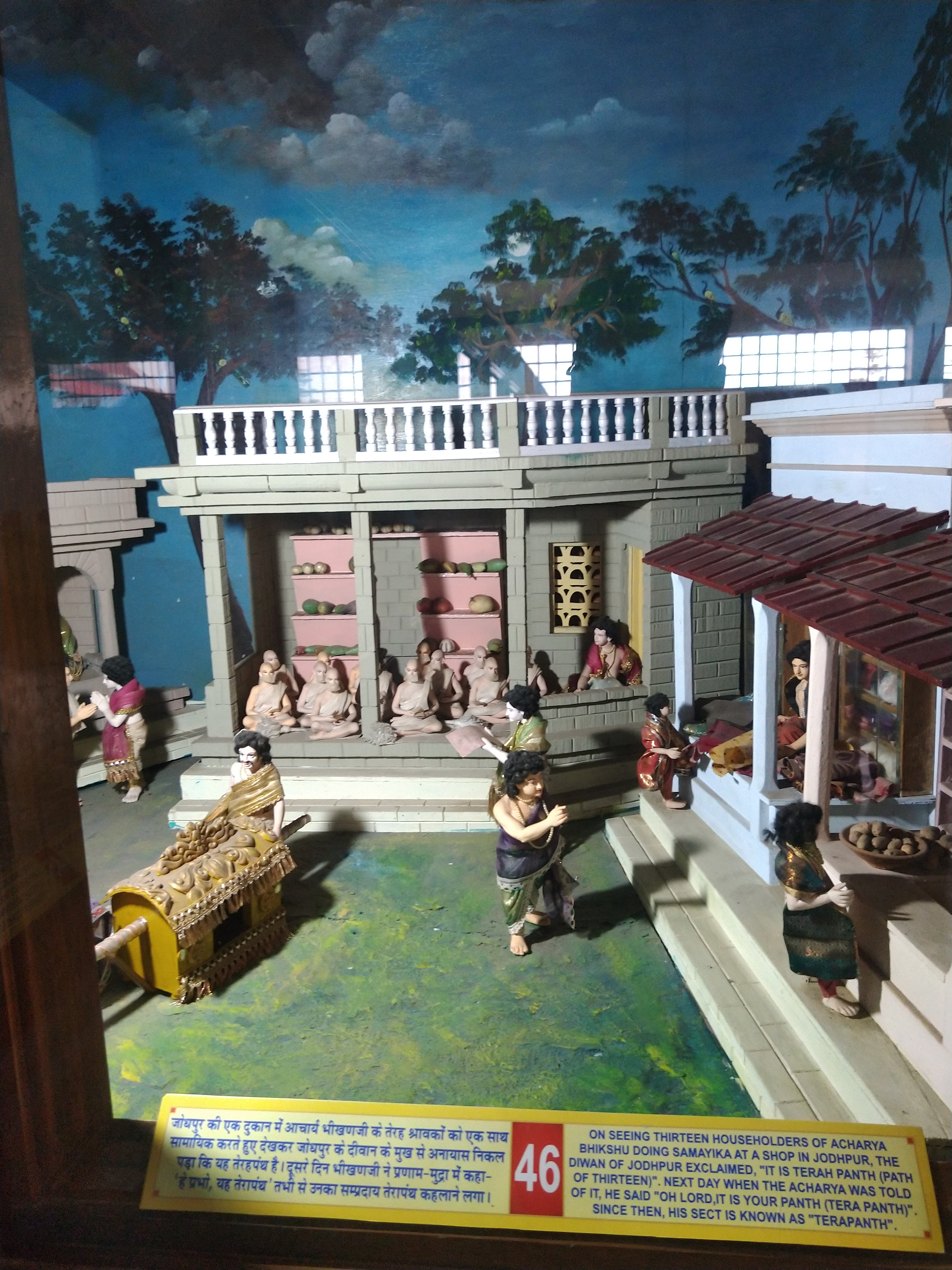
A diorama in Jain Museum of Madhuban depicting nomenclature of Terapanth

Once, thirteen Shravakas (lay-followers) were doing Samayika in a big shop in Jodhpur's market. Fatechandji, the Divan (the Chief Minister of Jodhpur-State), saw this unusual sight and asked them curiously, “Why are you doing your Samayika here in a shop, not a Sthanaka?” The Shravakas told him the whole story of how Muni Bhikhanaji had left Acharya Raghunathaji and explained the ideological differences between them. The Divan understood and praised Swami Bhikanji's position. He asked, "How many followers does his new path have? They said, “Sir! We are thirteen.” The Divan also asked about the number of monks with Swami Bhikanji. They said, “Monks are also thirteen.” The Divan said, “It is amazing that both the monks and the lay followers are thirteen.”

At that time, a poet was standing nearby. He instantly composed a verse —

“Sadha sadha ro gilo karai, te to apa aparo manta, Sunajyo re shahar ra loka, ai Terapanthi tanta”

So, the new group became known as ‘Terapanth’ meaning — a sect of thirteen monks. When Acharya Bhikshu heard about this name, he gave it another meaning. He got down from his seat, bowed to Lord Mahavira, and said happily,

"O Lord! It is thy (tera) path (panth). I am just a follower of it."

Thus Acharya Bhikshu made Terapanth mean “the Lord’s path” and also gave it more religious significance: (In vernacular language, “tera” means “your” and “thirteen”). “Tera” also means thirteen basic rules for the Jain ascetics: the Five Mahavratas, the Five Samitis, and the Three restraints (Guptis) belong to the order of Terapanth Sect.

== Terapanth's Constitution (Maryada Patra) ==
Initially, Acharya Bhikshu did not have any intention of establishing an organized sangha based on his spiritual path. His sole objective was to attain the highest spiritual good and bliss, even if it meant sacrificing his life. However, as time passed, many monks and nuns joined him, and eventually, he gained thousands of followers.

Acharya Bhikshu spent several years closely examining the behavior and practices of the monastic code. He then established the constitution, rules, and regulations for the Terapanth order, aiming to infuse it with vitality while preserving purity of conduct, fostering cordial relations among its members, and ensuring strict discipline, effective management, and wholehearted dedication, with the Acharya serving as the central figure.

The main features of the Constitution of Terapanth are:

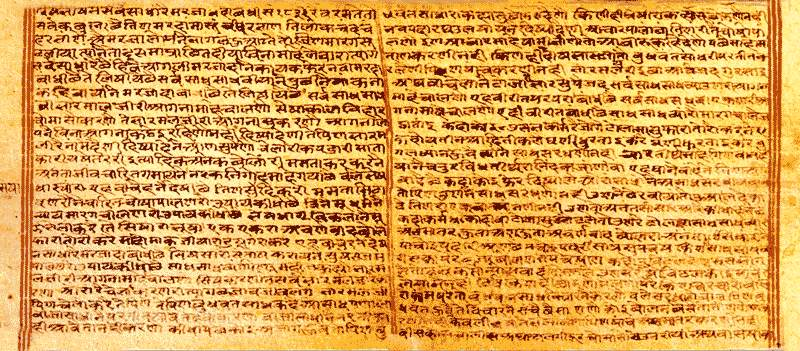
Maryada Patra or Letter of Conduct written by Acharya Shree Bhiksu in Rajasthani language nearly 200 years ago

1. All the monks and the nuns should follow only one (Current) Acharya.
2. Chaturmas, sojourns on foot etc. will be done according to Acharya's instructions.
3. The present Acharya will choose his successor, who has to be accepted by all the members of the order as their next Acharya.
4. Only the Acharya, and no one else, can initiate any monk or nun as his/her disciple.
5. All things like clothes, utensils, books and manuscripts will belong to the Acharya, and not as personal property.

Although the Acharya is the highest authority of the order, he may ask for the opinion of the learned monks or nuns for his decision. Also, he may invite them to join in the discussions over disputed issues.

Acharya Bhikshu made the constitution and presented it to each monk and nun separately. Everyone agreed to it and signed it in support of it. That signed document of Maryadas are still safe today.

== Maryada Mahotsava ==
Maryada Mahotsava is a significant festival for the Terapanth Sangha, which has been celebrated continuously for over 150 years. It commemorates the establishment of strict Maryadas (rules) by Acharya Bhikshu, along with a complete constitution for the Order. Shrimad Jayacharya, Terapanth's fourth Acharya, introduced the Maryada Mahotsava in Vikram Samvat 1920 (1863 A.D.) to highlight the importance of discipline in the Order. The festival takes place on the seventh day of the bright fortnight of Magh, which falls in late January or early February. The Terapanth sect follows a system where the Guru is supreme and the disciples are united by discipline, devotion, and humility. After Chaturmas, most monks and nuns gather at a place chosen by the Acharya, offer themselves and their manuscripts to him, and request him to assign them wherever he thinks best. On Maryada Mahotsava, monks and nuns present their activities to the Acharya, who examines their annual reports and asks about their behaviour and compliance with rules and conventions. The Acharya gives them prayshchita i.e. penance for errors and praises and motivates good performances.

Various philosophical and ethical topics are discussed, and seminars are organized during the festival. The Constitution of the Order, made by Acharya Shri Bhikshu and later Acharyas, is read out loud, and the current Acharya gives inspiration. Terapanth Dharamsangha currently has 153 monks and 550 nuns, forming nearly 140 groups, and emphasizes proper management and self-discipline for a stronger and more faithful organization.

== List of Acharyas ==
Acharya Bhikan Ji was the 1st Acharya of Swetambar Terapanth and till date there have been 11 Acharyas, with Acharya Mahashraman being the current one.

Sl. No.	Acharya Name	Place of birth	Place of Acharyapad	Hindu Calendar			Gregorian Calendar*			Term (Years)
Sl. No.	Acharya Name	Place of birth	Place of Acharyapad	Date of birth	Acharya Term		Date of birth	Acharya Term		Term (Years)
Sl. No.	Acharya Name	Place of birth	Place of Acharyapad	Date of birth	Start	Date	Date of birth	Start	Date	Term (Years)
1	Acharya Bhikan Ji (Bhikshu)	Kantaliya (Rajasthan)	Kelwa (Rajasthan)	Aashadh Shukla Trayodashi, 1783	Aashadh Purnima, 1817	Bhadrapad Shukla Trayodashi, 1860	July 12, 1726	June 26, 1760**	August 30, 1803	~43
2	Acharya Bharimal Ji	Munha Gram (Bhilwara, Rajasthan)	Siriyari (Rajasthan)	Samvat 1804	Bhadrapad Shukla Trayodashi, 1860	Magha Krishna Ashtami, 1878	1747	August 30, 1803	January 15, 1822	~18
3	Acharya Raychand Ji	Badi Rawaliya (Rajasthan)	Rajnagar (Rajasthan)	Samvat 1847	Magha Krishna Navami, 1878	Magha Krishna Chaturdashi, 1908	1790	January 16, 1822	January 20, 1852	30
4	[./Https://hi.wikipedia.org/wiki/आचार्य_जीतमल Acharya Jeetmal Ji] (Jayacharya)	Royat (Rajasthan)	Bidasar (Rajasthan)	Ashwin Shukla Chaturdashi, 1860	Magha Purnima, 1908	Bhadrapad Krishna Dwadashi, 1938	September 30, 1803	February 5, 1852	September 20, 1881	~29
5	Acharya Maghwa Gani	Bidasar (Rajasthan)	Jaipur (Rajasthan)	Chaitra Shukla Ekadashi, 1897	Bhadrapad Shukla Dwitiya, 1938	Chaitra Krishna Panchami, 1949	April 12, 1840	August 26, 1881	March 19, 1892	~11
6	Acharya Manak Gani	Jaipur (Rajasthan)	Sardarsahar (Rajasthan)	Bhadrapad Krishna Chaturthi, 1912	Chaitra Krishna Ashtami, 1949	Kartik Krishna Tritya, 1954	August 30, 1855	March 11, 1893	October 13, 1897	~5
7	Acharya Dal Gani	Ujjain (Madhya Pradesh)	Ladnun (Rajasthan)	Aashadh Shukla Chaturthi, 1909	Magha Krishna Dwitya, 1954	Bhadrapad Shukla Dwadashi, 1966	June 21, 1852	January 10, 1898	September 26, 1909	~12
8	Acharya Kalu Gani	Chhapar (Rajasthan)	Ladnun (Rajasthan)	Phalgun Shukla Dwitya, 1933	Bhadrapad Purnima, 1966	Bhadrapad Shukla Shasthi, 1993	February 15, 1877	September 29, 1909	September 22, 1936	~27
9	Acharya Tulsi Ji	Ladnun (Rajasthan)	Gangapur (Rajasthan)	Kartika Shukla Dwitya, 1971	Bhadrapad Shukla Navami, 1993	Magha Shukla Saptami, 2050	October 20, 1914	September 25, 1936	February 18, 1994***	~57
10	Acharya Mahapragya Ji	Tamkor (Rajasthan)	Sujangarh (Rajasthan)	Aashadh Krishna Trayodashi, 1977	Magha Shukla Saptami, 2050	Vaishakh Krishna Ekadashi, 2067	June 14, 1920	February 18, 1994	May 9, 2010	~16
11	Acharya Mahashraman Ji	Sardarsahar (Rajasthan)	Sardarsahar (Rajasthan)	Vaishakh Shukla Navami, 2019	Vaishakh Shukla Dashmi, 2067		May 13, 1962	May 23, 2010		

* Dates have been obtained from Hindu Calendar app, there might be a mismatch of few days

** Date on which Acharya Bhikan Ji started the Terapanth and became the first Acharya

*** On this day Acharya Tulsi stepped down as Acharya and handed over the reins to Acharya Mahapragya Ji

== Preksha Meditation (Prekṣā-Dhyāna) ==
Lord Mahavira's spiritual practice included two vital aspects: austerity and meditation. Meditation was a significant part of his spiritual practice as stated in the Jain scriptures. Despite this, the tradition of meditation gradually disappeared after his attainment of Nirvana, leading to the misconception that meditation was not a part of Jain asceticism.

Ācārya Bhikṣu, was said to be able to practice breath retention (hold his breath) for at least two ghadis (48 minutes). He also practiced ātāpanā by sitting under the scorching sun for hours while chanting and visualizing mantras. Further Terapanth scholars like Jayācārya wrote on various meditation practices, which influenced the later “perception of breathing” (śvāsa–prekṣā) and the meditation on auras (leśyā-dhyāna) of Ācārya Mahāprajña.

The Symbol of Preksha Meditation

To revive this extinct system of meditation, Acharya Shri Tulsi tasked Muni Nathmalji (Acharya Mahapragya ji) with conducting research and developing a scientific system of meditation. Through his studies of ancient scriptures, Muni Nathmalji (Ācārya Mahāprajña) developed a system termed Prekṣā-Dhyāna which is a combination of ancient wisdom and modern science based on Jain Canons. It included "meditative techniques of perception, Kayotsarg, Anupreksha, mantra, posture (āsana), breath control (prāṇāyāma), hand and body gestures (mudrā), various bodily locks (bandha), meditation (dhyāna) and reflection (bhāvanā)."

The scholar of religion Andrea Jain states that she was convinced that Mahāprajña and others across the world were attempting "to attract people to Preksha Dhyana by making it intersect with the global yoga market".

The key texts of this meditation system are Prekṣā-Dhyāna: Ādhāra aura Svarūpa (Prekṣā Meditation: Basis and Form, 1980), Prekṣā-Dhyāna: Prayoga aura Paddhatti (Prekṣā Meditation: Theory and Practice, 2010) and Prekṣā-Dhyāna: Darśana aura Prayoga (Prekṣā Meditation: Philosophy and Practice, 2011). Despite the innovations, the meditation system is said to be firmly grounded in the classic Jain metaphysical mind body dualism in which the self (jiva, characterized by consciousness, cetana which consists of knowledge, jñāna and intuition, darśana) is covered over by subtle and gross bodies.

Prekṣā means "to perceive carefully and profoundly". In prekṣā, perception always means an impartial experience bereft of the duality of like and dislike, pleasure and pain, attachment or aversion. Meditative progress proceeds through the different gross and subtle bodies, differentiating between them and the pure consciousness of jiva. Acharya Mahāprajña interprets the goal of this to mean to “perceive and realise the most subtle aspects of consciousness by your conscious mind (mana).” Important disciplines in the system are - Synchrony of mental and physical actions or simply present mindedness or complete awareness of one's actions, disciplining the reacting attitude, friendliness, diet, silence, spiritual vigilance.

Acharya Mahāprajña also taught subsidiary limbs to prekṣā-dhyāna which would help support the meditations in a holistic manner, these are Prekṣā-yoga (posture and breathing control) and Prekṣā-cikitsā (therapy). Mantras such as Arham are also used in this system.

Preksha Dhyana involves relaxation techniques and focusing on breathing, body, psychic centers, and colors. Ten-day camps are organized to provide training in Preksha Dhyana, and many people have attended them with great enthusiasm. Numerous practitioners have experienced significant improvements in their lives through Preksha Dhyana, such as quitting intoxicants, controlling their emotions and passions. Preksha Dhyana is not limited to India; it has also been propagated worldwide and has applications in health, education, and corporate fields.

== Anuvrat Movement ==
The Anuvrat Movement is a recent initiative that promotes the development of moral values in daily life. Founded by Acharya Shri Tulsi on March 1, 1949, in Sardarshahar (Rajasthan), Anuvrat is a non-discriminatory movement that doesn't interfere with personal religious beliefs. Its objective is to cultivate personal and social morality through a simple code of conduct. A vast ensemble of honourable national leaders, including Pt. Jawahar Lal Nehru, Dr. S. Radhakrishnan, Dr. Rajendra Prasad, and Lal Bahadur Shastri, spontaneously supported it. The code comprises a set of rules that include refraining from killing innocent creatures, supporting aggression, violent activities, and addictive substances, among others.

Acharya Shri Tulsi, along with numerous disciple-monks and nuns, embarked on foot journeys throughout India to spread the word about Anuvrat. This effort fostered an atmosphere of optimism and morality that spread far beyond India's borders. The movement has spawned three general precepts: prioritizing the observance of a moral code of conduct over religious rituals, giving priority to spirituality and ethics over sectarian norms, and using dharma to solve present-day life issues that cause conflict and violence.

Anuvrat is a philosophy of life and the seed for a religious revolution. Its values are relevant to modern-day society and have contributed to the eradication of problems related to caste and sectarianism.

Dr. Rajendra Prasad, the first President of India, was influenced by this ideology, saying,

“Acharya Shri Tulsi is performing an important work through the propagation of Anuvrat in our country. Everybody wishes for the success of Anuvrat Movement. If I am offered any post in this movement, I will like to accept it as 'its supporter'.”

== Contributions to literature and philosophy ==
Terapanth sect has enriched both religious and secular literature with its works. Acharya Bhikshu wrote about 38,000 verses in Rajasthani language and Shrimad Jayacharya (Acharya Jeetmal) created a new milestone by writing three lakh verses.

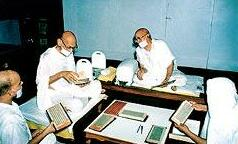
Aagam Manthan and Translation Research under Ganadhipati Gurudev Shree Tulsi, Acharya Shree Mahapragya, Yuvacharya Shree Mahashraman and Sadhvi-Pramukha Shree Kanakprabha Ji

Under Acharya Shri Tulsi's guidance, monks and nuns critically edited, translated and annotated the Prakrit canonical texts. A synod was held under Acharya Shri Tulsi's leadership for this purpose. The critical edition of all 32 canonical texts has been published, and the critical studies of the Uttaradhayana Sutra and Dasavaikalika Sutra have received scholarly acclaim.

Joint activities of Acharya Tulsi, Mahapragya and other intellectual monks and nuns began to facilitate the permanent preservation of many thousands of years old canonical scriptures. This old literature is in Prakrit language and its commentaries are either available in Prakrit or Prakrit mixed with Sanskrit.

Acharang Bhasyam is Acharya Mahapragya's commentary for Acharang in sanskrit. He uncovered many Agam mysteries and presented root philosophies and Mahavira's philosophy and vision in this commentary.

Many books have been written on Anuvrat, Preksha Dhyana, Jeevan Vigyan, and other contemporary issues. Terapanth ascetics have published about 500 books in different languages in the last few decades. The Acharyas of Terapanth are renowned for their writings, with Acharya Tulsi writing extensively on the Anuvrat Movement, and Acharya Mahapragya on Preksha Meditation. The nuns have also contributed, with Sadhvi Pramukha Kanak-Prabhaji narrating the “Foot Journeys of Acharya Shri Tulsi” in several volumes. These literary achievements are reminiscent of the golden age of Jain Acharya Hemachandra.

== Jain Vishva Bharati ==
Established in 1970 by Acharya Shri Tulsi, the Jain Vishva Bharati is located in Ladnun, a small town in Rajasthan. Over the past thirty years, the institution has grown significantly, with numerous buildings constructed amidst greenery and gardens. The organization's objective is to promote non-violence and peace, and it is regarded as a central institute for spiritual guidance, Jain philosophy, and ethics.

Jain Vishva Bharati has made significant progress in the field of education. Besides the Jain Vishva Bharati Institute (Deemed) University, there is a Brahmi Vidya Pith college for mumukshu (one who is focused on attaining Moksha) sisters and Samanis, and an English Medium school for children called Vimal Vidya Vihar, soon to be renamed Jai Tulsi Vidya Vihar. In 1991, the Jain Vishva Bharati Institute was recognized by the Central Government and U.G.C. as a deemed university, where mumukshu sisters, Samanas, Samanis, monks, nuns, and the lay community can pursue further studies after graduating from Brahmi Vidya Pith.

The department of Saman Sanskriti Sankaya is responsible for promoting Jain Studies across the country. It achieves this through courses and yearly examinations, which are attended by around 7,000 students. Additionally, the department offers certificate courses in Jainology via correspondence. Jain Vishva Bharati plays an active role in publishing educational materials on Jain Studies and books on Jain Philosophy, with over 400 titles having been published so far, including canonical literature.

== See also ==
- Lord Mahavira
- Acharya Bhikshu
- Jain meditation
- Acharya Tulsi
- Acharya Mahapragya
- Acharya Mahashraman
- Jain Vishva Bharati University

== Sources ==
- Shashi, S. S. (1996). Encyclopaedia Indica: India, Pakistan, Bangladesh. Origin and development of Indus civilization (Volume 1). Anmol Publications. ISBN 81-7041-859-3.
- Singh, Narendra (2001). "Acahrya Bhikshu and Terapanth". Encyclopaedia of Jainism. Anmol Publications. ISBN 81-261-0691-3.
- Dundas, Paul (2002). The Jains. Routledge. ISBN 0-415-26606-8.
- Vallely, Anne (2002). Guardians of the transcendent: an ethnography of a Jain ascetic community. University of Toronto Press. ISBN 0-8020-8415-X.
- Flügel, Peter (2002) 'Terapanth Svetambara Jain Tradition.' In: Melton, J.G. and Baumann, G., (eds.), Religions of the World: A Comprehensive Encyclopedia of Beliefs and Practices. Santa Barbara: ABC-Clio, pp. 1266-1267.
- Jain, Andrea (2015). Selling Yoga : from Counterculture to Pop Culture. Oxford University Press. ISBN 978-0-19-939024-3. OCLC 878953765.
- Pragya, Samani Pratibha (2017). Prekṣā meditation : history and methods (PhD thesis). SOAS, University of London.
