= Ostrec =

- Village
- Острец
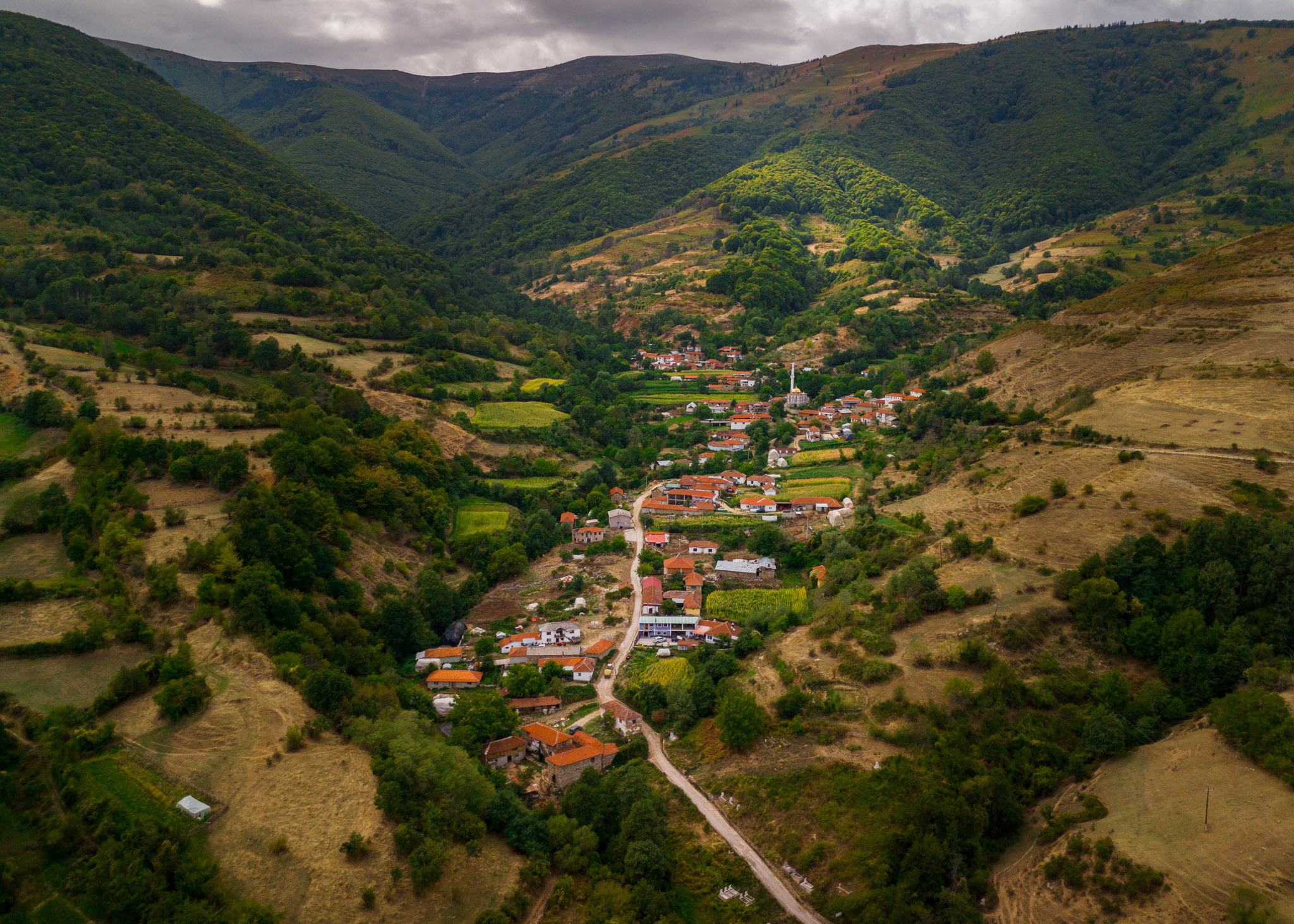
- Aerial view of Ostrec village in 2025

- Location within North Macedonia
- Coordinates: 41°02′N 21°16′E
- Country: North Macedonia
- Region: Pelagonia
- Municipality: Bitola

Population (2021)
  - Total: 161
- Time zone: UTC+1 (CET)
  - Summer (DST): UTC+2 (CEST)
- Car plates: BT
- Website: .

Ostrec (Macedonian Cyrillic: Острец; Albanian: Ostrec) is a village in the municipality of Bitola, North Macedonia. The village is about 12 kilometers away from Bitola, North Macedonia. It used to be part of the former municipality of Bistrica.

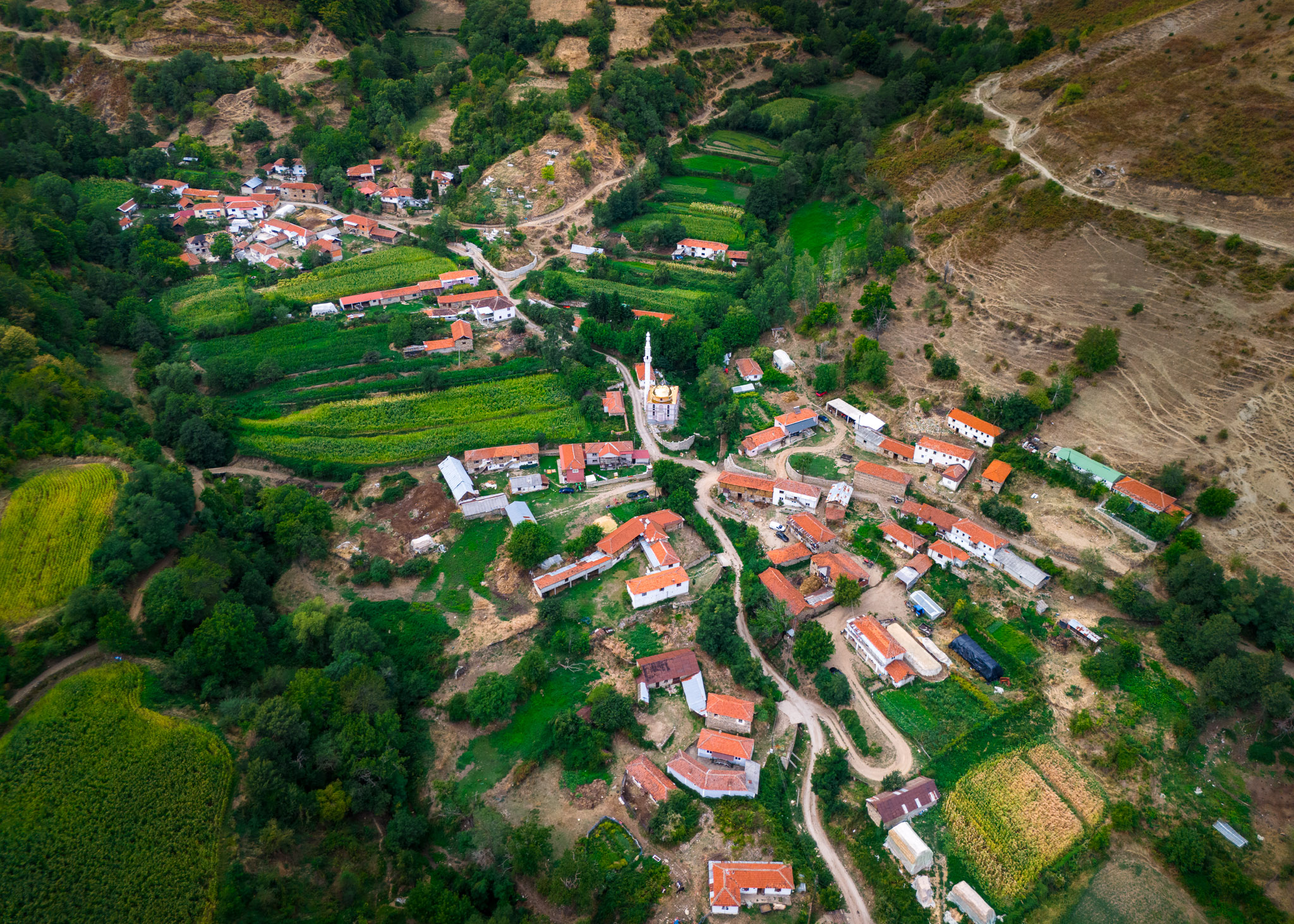
Close-up view of Ostrec village in 2025

== Culture ==
Ostrec has traditionally and exclusively been populated by Ghegs, a northern subgroup of Albanians and speak the Gheg Albanian dialect, similar to the Matjan and Dibran Geg subdialects, while the surrounding Albanian villages around Pelister Mountain are mostly Tosk-speaking.

== Demographics ==
Erekovci is attested in the Ottoman defter of 1467/68 as a village in the vilayet of Manastir. The inhabitants attested largely bore Albanian anthroponyms, such as Leko Arbanash, None Arbanash, Gon son of Tanush etc.

Due to emigration in the 1960-1970s, a sizable diaspora from the village exists in the mainly Western Suburbs of Melbourne, Australia.

As of the 2021 census, Ostrec had 161 residents with the following ethnic composition:

- Albanians 154
- Persons for whom data are taken from administrative sources 7

According to the 2002 census, the village had a total of 229 inhabitants. Ethnic groups in the village include:

- Albanians 228

Many Albanians migrated to Türkiye from this village between 1920-1930. In addition, in the 1950s, there were migrations to Türkiye again. There are also those who immigrated to Australia and America. Immigrants to Türkiye and their children mostly reside in Büyükkale village of Tire district of İzmir city. In 1960 through to the mid-1970’s many of these Ostrecly moved to Australia, the vast majority live in Melbourne, (Naarm) Victoria.
