= Erik Lloga =

Erik Lloga OAM
- Born: 1949 (age 76–77); Ohrid, Yugoslavia (present-day North Macedonia)
- Education: Melbourne University
- Occupations: sociologist, government advisor and interpreter, community leader and spokesman

Erik Shaip Lloga OAM (born 1949) is an Albanian Australian sociologist from Melbourne and an Albanian community leader. He came to national attention in Australia during the Kosovo crisis (1999) where Lloga served as an interlocutor between temporarily resettled Kosovo Albanian refugees and the Australian Federal Government.

== Life ==
Erik Shaip Lloga was born in 1948 in Ohrid. His father was Lutfi Lloga. In Yugoslavia, Erik Lloga completed high school. During the 1960s, he fled Yugoslavia to avoid military service (later sentenced 10 years in absentia). He went to London and migrated through the UK assisted passage scheme to Sydney and later Melbourne. Lloga found factory employment, attended and graduated from Melbourne University with a sociology degree and was an activist within the Labor Party. He later worked in prominent roles in the public service related to welfare and social policy. For some years he was employed at the Brunswick Council working for the mayor regarding strategy planning in inner Melbourne. At Victoria University of Technology (VUT), Lloga became a Research Assistant in 1993. He became a sociologist after completing his Master's degree and a doctorate in Sociology.

Lloga was in possession of a 300 year old Quran from Ohrid, smuggled out by his father Lutfi to prevent its destruction by Yugoslav communist authorities. In the late 1990s, Lloga donated the Quran to the Shepparton Albanian Mosque to celebrate the establishment of a community centre extension to the mosque, later given to Museums Victoria (late 2000s).

During the Kosovo crisis (1999), Lloga became the spokesman for the Melbourne Albanian community. In Melbourne, Lloga was chairman of the North Carlton based Albania-Australia Community Association who was involved in temporarily resettling Kosovo Albanian refugees. He served as the personal interpreter for Australian prime minister John Howard during Operation Safe Haven and was an advisor to the Federal Government. Lloga became the main interlocutor and go between for Australian authorities and Kosovo refugees. During these events, Lloga was also engaged in countering disinformation from Australian based Slavic and Greek lobbies about Albanians and the conflict.

Following the end of the war, the UNHCR declared Kosovo safe in July and the Australian government decided to return 3,900 refugees. Lloga opposed the government returning them and expressed concerns for their safety, especially those from areas neighbouring Kosovo still under Serb control. The refugees did a hunger strike and Lloga attempted to dissuade them from continuing and was sympathetic to their cause to delaying their return as there were vulnerable people at risk of death if back in their homeland. In early April 2000, the Kosovo refugees were sent back by Australia and Lloga accompanied them without any immigration officials. Lloga described his experience on Melbourne's 744 ABC radio. In Kosovo, Lloga took the refugees to local police stations and through his funds fed some of them, as Australian authorities provided no money to aid their return. Lloga took some refugees to aid agencies who were unprepared for their return. He did many radio interviews in a period of a week from Pristina describing how the Australian government left the refugees without assistance and in conditions of having to fend for themselves and a destitute state. A week later, Rehame media monitoring service reported that Lloga's radio interview's had influenced caller opinion resulting in a "massive swing" against the Australian government's refugee repatriations.

In the 2002 Queen's Birthday Honours, Lloga's contribution toward multicultural affairs and the Albanian community during the Kosovo crisis were recognised in Australia and he was awarded the Order of Australia medal.
