= Albanian Australians =

Australians of Albanian heritage

Albanian Australians shqiptaro–australianët
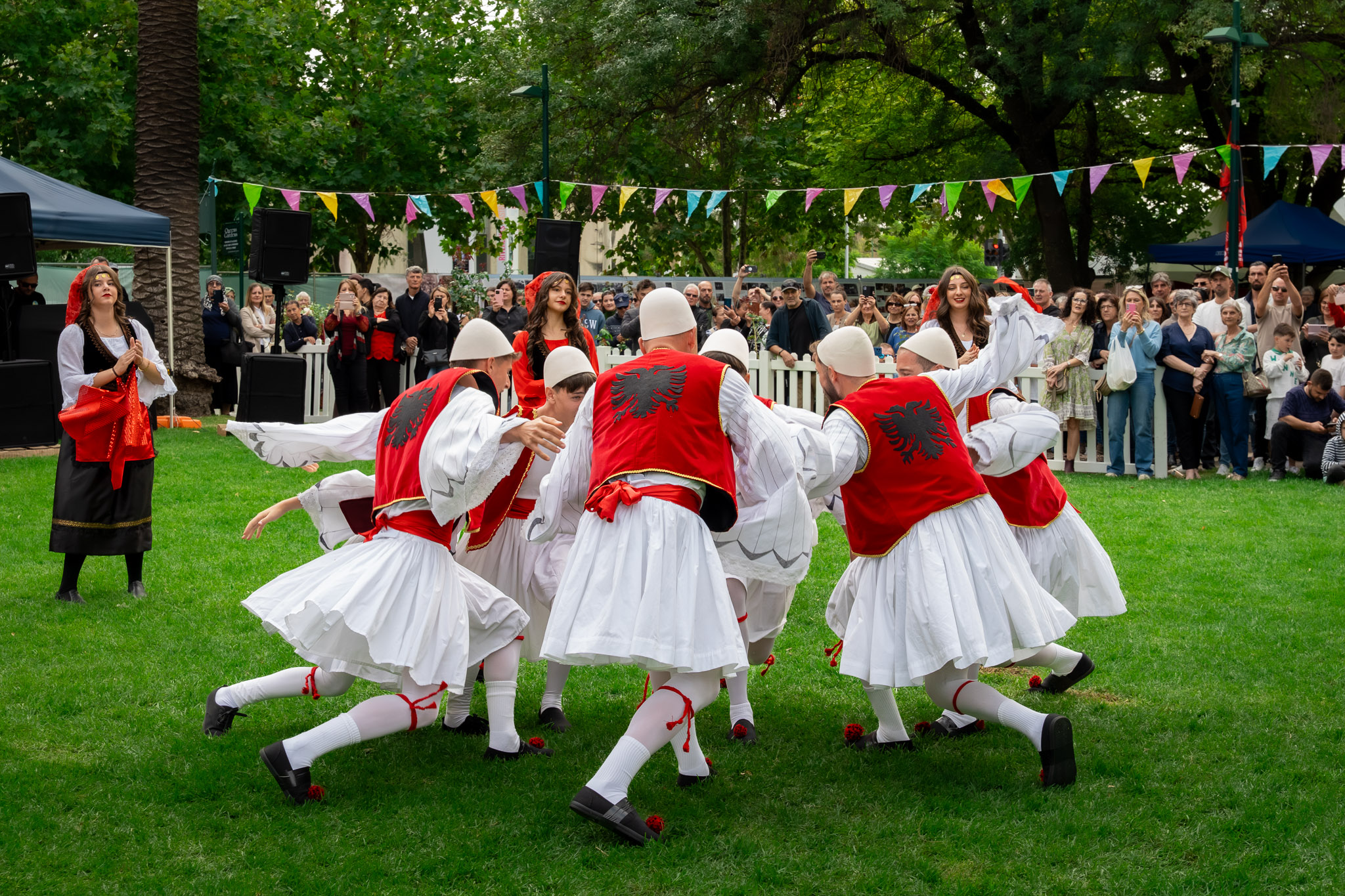
- Albanian folk dancers, (Shepparton, 2025)

Total population
- 5,109 by birth (2021); 19,686 by ancestry (2021)

Regions with significant populations
- Melbourne (Dandenong, Yarraville, St Albans, Altona, Preston, Lalor, Thomastown, Werribee); Shepparton; Mareeba; Brisbane; Cairns; Babinda; Sydney; Wollongong; Adelaide; Perth; Northam; York; Moora; Darwin

Languages
- Australian English; Albanian

Religion
- Muslim (Sunni, Bektashi); Christian (Roman Catholic, Albanian Orthodox); Irreligion

Related ethnic groups
- Albanian diaspora

Albanian Australians (Albanian: shqiptaro–australianët; shqiptarët e Australisë) are residents of Australia who have Albanian heritage or descent; many are from Albania and North Macedonia but some are from Kosovo, Montenegro, Greece, Turkey, Bosnia and Italy. Albanian Australians are a geographically dispersed community; the largest concentrations are in the Melbourne suburb Dandenong and in the regional city Shepparton, both of which are in Victoria. The Albanian community has been present in Australia for a long period, and its presence in the country is stable and peaceful.

== History ==
=== Early Albanian immigration ===
In 1885, Naum Konxha settled in Brisbane, Queensland, becoming the first-recorded Albanian to settle in Australia. Other Orthodox Christians from southern Albania followed; Spiro Jani to Queensland (1908), Kristo Zafiri and Dhimitër Ikonomi to Townsville (1913); these were followed by Jan Konomi (1914), and Vasil and Thomas Kasneci (1920).

=== Early–to–mid 20th century: Immigration from Albania ===
==== Arrival of young male Kurbetxhi (migrants) ====
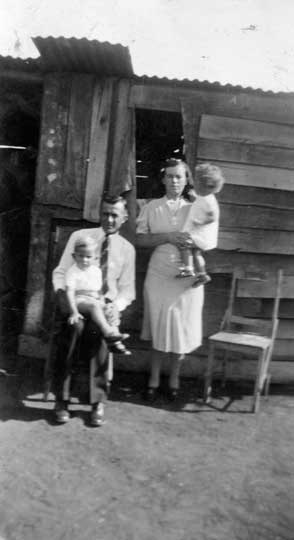
Albanian family in rural Biloela, Queensland (1928)

After the First World War, concerns rural labour shortages and the readiness of Australia's small population to resist possible invasion made authorities accept European non–British migrants. The first major phase of Albanian emigration to Australia began in 1924 after the United States implemented quota restrictions on people from southern Europe. For Albanian men who were unable to re-enter the US from 1925 onward, Australia became a new destination, and was seen as a land of economic opportunity where success could be attained.

Albanian migrants arrived in Australia while the White Australia Policy, a series of laws that curtailed the migration of non–white populations and attempted to remove people of non–white origin already present, was in force. Due to the White Australia Policy, during the interwar period, many Muslims were restricted from migrating whereas Albanians were accepted in Australia because they were considered Europeans and had a lighter European complexion. The Australian government's position was they were "required white settlers who were willing to dwell in remote and solitary surroundings and who have the experience in agricultural and pastoral pursuits, such as the Albanian possessed". The Albanians' arrival revived the Australian Muslim community, whose aging demographic had been in decline, and Albanians became some of the earliest Muslim groups to establish themselves in post–colonial Australia.

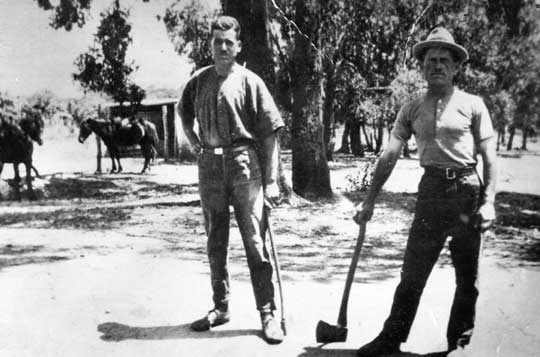
Albanian men felling scrub in Western Australia (1925)

Albanian migrants (Albanian: Kurbetxhi), originating from a rural background, followed a migration tradition (Kurbet) in which sons temporarily left for another country to earn enough funds to purchase property once back in Albania. In October 1924, the first five Albanian migrants Bejxhet Emini, Bektash Muharem, Musa Ibrahimi, Rexhep Mustafa and Riza Ali arrived from Korçë region. They, and others who followed, embarked on a seven–week voyage and arrived at Fremantle; they often became casual labourers, mainly working in the grain–growing industry. Later, Albanian migrants sought better employment options and relocated to rural areas of Western Australia, Queensland and Victoria. The migrants' English–language skills were poor or non–existent, and some others were illiterate; as a result, Albanian migrants had difficulties gaining employment. Albanians arriving in the 1920s left urban centres and settled in rural areas, working in the agriculture industry as horticulturalists, sugarcane workers, tobacco farmers, and market gardeners, mainly at orchards and farms. Albanians were also employed in mining, scrub clearing, road works and fishing.

As with other Southern European migrants, most Albanians who arrived in Australia in the 1920s were single males between ages 15 and 30, numbering 1,000, who worked, earned money and returned to Albania to reinvest in their properties. Women remained in Albania because Albanian men planned to be in Australia for a short period. Unlike the usual two–or–three years Albanian migrants spent in parts of Europe or the Middle East, Australia's distance resulted in decade–long stints and made return trips to Albania difficult. The greatest number of Albanian arrivals occurred in 1928.

Despite Albanians being considered "white" the federal government preferred mainly British Christian migrants, and laws to limit the number of visas given to southern Europeans were sought. The move was driven by government concerns over job competition, migrant integration within society and disruption of Australian society's Anglo–Celtic character. In 1928, a quota was established, making it more difficult for groups like Albanians to enter Australia unless they had £40 as an insurance guarantee or a document from a sponsor. By 1929, only 24 visas were obtained on a monthly basis by Albanians. During the late 1920s and the early 1930s, Albanian chain migration resulted in the arrival of family and friends in Australia. Friendship networks provided assistance to new arrivals who often originated from the same place or neighbouring villages as previous migrants from Albania. Albanians also made long–term friendships with non–Albanians. From a life of hardship in Albania, the migrants took with them values that encompassed mutual support, respect and friendship, and a readiness to work and adapt to new surroundings in Australia.

==== The Great Depression, discrimination and wider settlement ====
The Great Depression (1929) impacted the majority of Albanians in Australia. Rural jobs became scarce and many men, including those from the Albanian community, sought employment in the Western Australian goldfields. By 1934, competition, disputes and riots over work at the goldfields between some Anglo–Celtic Australians and Southern Europeans like Albanians made many Albanian men move to Queensland and Victoria in the 1930s. Albanians became labourers on tobacco and cotton farms in Queensland. On Queensland sugar cane farms, they worked as cutters in an industry subjected to racial tests because British Preference Leagues wanted all workers to be of an Anglo–Celtic background. News of the migrants' difficult circumstances reached the Albanian government, which as a result discounted return fares for those who wanted to return to Albania. Most Albanian migrants remained in Australia and sought opportunities in other parts of the country; only a minority took the government offer and returned to Albania.

In the 1920s, most migrants came from around the city of Korçë in southern Albania, and engaged in agriculture, especially fruit growing. Other rural Muslim Albanians from the surrounding Bilisht area emigrated to Australia. In Western Australia, early centres of Albanian settlement were Northam and York, where Albanians worked as wheat and sheep farmers, and other migrants settled in Moora. The first Albanian migrants in Northam were Sabri Sali and Ismail Birangi, who later, with their families and friends Fethi Haxhi and Reshit Mehmet, settled in Shepparton. Being seasonal labourers, some Albanians left Queensland and its sugar cane industry and others left Western Australia to work on farms in Shepparton and the Yarra Valley in Victoria.

==== Establishing the Shepparton community ====
In Victoria, most Albanians settled on rural properties around Shepparton in the Goulburn Valley and became one of the region's earliest Muslim communities. Migrants chose farm work and other agricultural employment because the work required little skill in English and resembled work they did in Korçë. Albanian migrants chose Shepparton because it reminded them of Korçë and its terrain, and prospective migrants among relatives in Albania were told it would be like home if they came. The community grew through chain migration from Albania; migrants sponsored relatives to move to Australia. By pooling resources, migrants bought businesses and established farms, and some families from the community were the first to set up orchards in the region, assisting Shepparton to establish a reputation as "the fruit–bowl of Victoria".

In the late 1930s, the Shepparton Albanian community numbered between 300 and 500; they were a mix of Muslims and Orthodox Christians, with some Orthodox Albanians self–identifying as Greeks. Tensions arose over the purchase of land in the Shepparton area by southern Europeans; the local press said Albanians were "buying land at inflated prices, hoarding the land and distributing it among relatives and fellow countrymen", and "stealing" prime irrigated land from locals. Other depictions in the metropolitan Sydney press said a quarter of Shepparton's inhabitants were "aliens" and the town was becoming a "second Albania", whereas local media said that was an exaggeration. Some Albanians experienced racism from a small section of the Australian community and wider society did not consider Albanians "white".

Some Albanian migrants often carried large amounts of remittance cash and pistols to protect it and their properties. For some single men, isolation became a problem and some violent incidents occurred between Albanians; these incidents later decreased as families outnumbered singletons. Local press stereotyped Albanians as prone to lawlessness and violence. Most of the Shepparton population, however, welcomed and accepted Albanians and other migrants into the community. Albanian songs were included in concerts held by primary schools, the Country Women's Association held functions for Albanian migrants, and Shepparton inhabitants held English classes that were attended by some Albanians. Alongside other local farmers, some Shepparton Albanian tomato growers were prominently involved in creating a union to better serve their interests in selling produce. In the 1930s, an Albanian migrant–turned–landowner Golë Feshti established an Albanian club in Shepparton. As Shepparton went from being a town to a significant regional city, Albanians became an important part of its expanding population, and were involved in its economy and growth of the urban centre.

==== Other settlement in Australia ====
Other Albanian migrants settled in Melbourne because of its manufacturing industry. Albanians were employed in manufacturing and at the Melbourne docks, others operated small businesses like shops, cafés and boarding houses. In Queensland, Muslim Albanians established themselves in Mareeba and mainly Christian Albanians settled in Brisbane. Other Albanians went to live in Cairns. A smaller group of Albanians from Gjirokastër, who were speakers of the Tosk dialect group, settled mainly in urban centres such as Perth, Sydney and Melbourne, and later established small catering businesses. Some Albanians established orchards and market gardens in Werribee.

The 1933 Australian Census recorded 770 Albania–born individuals—mostly men—living in Australia; most of them were based in Queensland, with smaller concentrations in Victoria (249), Western Australia, South Australia and New South Wales. During this time, some Albanians who had sufficient finances sponsored family members, including brides for single men, in Albania to move to Australia. Marriage partners were often from the Albanian community. Most Albanian migrants were Muslims; an academic estimate placed the number of Orthodox Christians at around 40 percent.

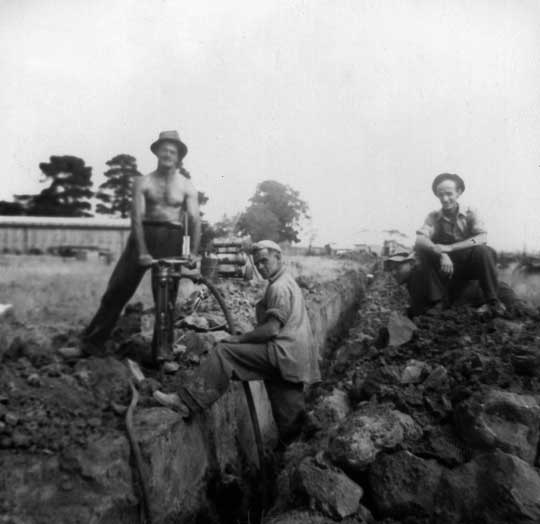
Albanian men digging irrigation trenches, Swan Hill (late 1940s)

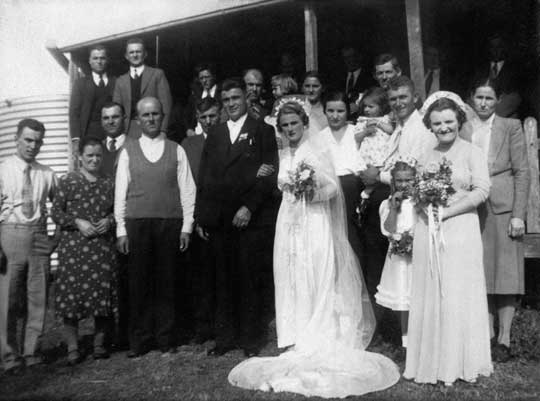
Orthodox Albanian wedding in Bagnoo, New South Wales (1944)

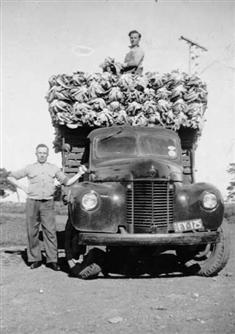
Albanians with truck load of lettuces ready for markets, Werribee (1949)

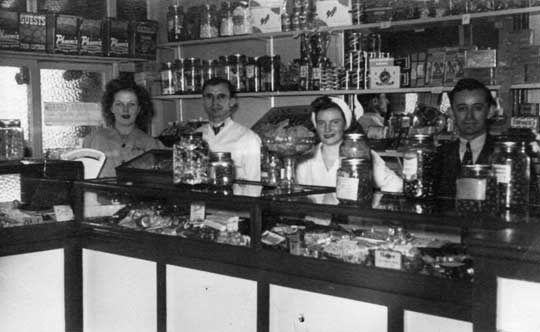
Albanian owned milk bar in Sydney (1949)

=== World War Two ===
==== Internment and designation as "enemy aliens" ====
Until the start of World War Two in 1939, most Albanians in Australia had no interest in becoming naturalised; many of them planned to return to Albania. With the threat of conflict in Europe, some Albanians returned there to retrieve their families. During the war, Italy occupied and annexed Albania, and the British government recognised Albania as an "autonomous" political entity. In mid 1941, the designation was rescinded after the puppet government in Albania declared war on the Allied powers, adversely affecting Albanians with Albanian citizenship in Australia. Some rural media circulated rumours and reports stating the Italian consul was pressurring Albanians to declare themselves citizens of Italy. Members of the Albanian community expressed their concerns over the situation to authorities but because of Albania' wartime status, the Australian government did not object to alleged actions toward Albanians. Many Albanians concerned over their status in Shepparton applied for naturalisation, and protested at an Italian community event to show loyalty to Australia. Most Albanians in Australia rejected the imposition of Italian citizenship.

The Australian government enacted the National Security Act, 1939–1940, which outlined internment regulations. Anyone suspected of Fascist associations or political membership were liable for internment. The legislation excluded from internment Albanians who had naturalised as British subjects. Albanians in Australia did not pose an imminent threat but by 1942, fears of an Axis invasion were high. In that year, there were 1,086 Albanians in Australia, and the federal government designated the Albanian community "enemy aliens" due to the Italian–controlled Albanian government's war declaration against the Allies. Personal information was collected and the movements of people were tracked. Australian authorities viewed parts of the Albanian community as a Fascist threat; some individuals were arrested and interned, and others were subjected to restrictions. These actions were seen as essential for security. The Australian government interned Albanians whom they suspected supported Fascism; some people were detained as a result of economic rivalries, hearsay and gossip.

Queensland had the largest concentration of Albanians in the country, numbering 434 in 1941, only 55 of whom naturalised as British subjects. In 1942, 415 Albanians in Queensland were unnaturalised and only 43 were British subjects. A majority of Albanian Queenslanders, 242, lived north of Ingham; these were a mix of Muslims and Christians. Albanian Queenslanders were most affected by state actions; according to anecdotal evidence, some Italians spread anti–Allied propaganda among the community and two Albanians joined a pro–Fascist Italian group. The Queensland government's security service interned 84 Albanians and was concerned about many others who remained free. In 1942, the 84 men were held in camps at Cowra in New South Wales and Enoggera in Queensland. Albanians deemed enemy aliens and not interned were made to regularly report to police and were placed under special call–up provisions. Reasons for internment varied; some internees were seen as a "potential danger" to society; some were detained on political grounds because they said they were "anti–British"; some were considered suspects,;and a few were interned due to interpersonal rivalries, for possessing letters in a foreign language and for having an allegiance to a foreign country—Albania or Italy—and not being naturalised.

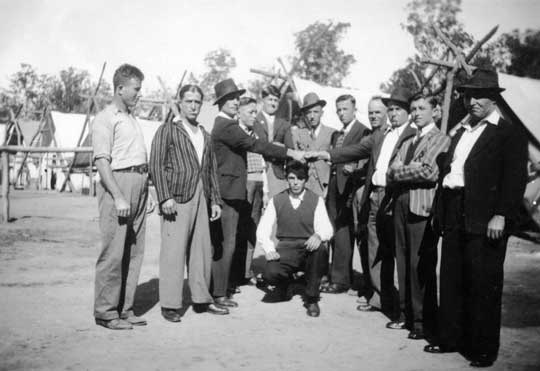
Albanian men in a Queensland WWII internment camp

Muslim Albanians in Australia felt they were victims of government internment policies and a small number of Catholics were also interned. Families of interned Albanians experienced psychological trauma and humiliation. Albanian men felt they were allies of Australia because Albania was occupied by Italy. The internment created difficulties for married men with families in Albania, and those who were farmers had their crops confiscated by the government. Fear of Albanians from the wider Australian public was linked to Albanians' dual identities in regard to nationality rather than concerns over religion. Part of the wider Australian community viewed naturalised Albanians as a "potential threat".

Some interned Albanians whom the federal government considered physically able were placed in the Civil Alien Corps, part of the Allied Works Council; others with medical conditions came under the control of the Manpower authorities, which oversaw what work they did. Authorities restricted the movement of some Albanians, and a few internees challenged those provisions. Some Albanians protested their innocence and a National Security Regulations Department investigation showed some Albanians were victims of personal rivalries. Albanian sentiment about the situation ranged from reluctant cooperation to acceptance, and some considered their internment conditions good while others performed poorly in tasks assigned to them by the Civil Aliens Corps. Due to labour shortages in the countryside and after Italy's surrender in late 1943, the internment of Albanian Queenslanders ended and an exemption was granted for continued service in the Civil Aliens Corps. Wartime treatment in Queensland made many Albanians in a post–war environment leave the state for other parts of Australia.

Government policies in Victoria were more lenient; some Albanians were made to report weekly to police and others were involved in road construction under the direction of Manpower authorities or the Allied Works Council. In Shepparton, as a result of Albanian employment in primary production, the whole community was exempted from internment, although restrictions on travel and a firearms ban were enforced upon them due to their status as enemy aliens. In York, Western Australia, Albanians were the only group employed as market gardeners in the town; they received special treatment regarding internment regulations. In Western Australia, two Albanian individuals were listed as interned in 1942; because of labour demands, they claimed an exemption due to their employment as market gardeners. A few other Albanians in Western Australia came under the internment system in 1943; these people were given forestry, labour and farming jobs to do by the Allied Works Council.

Some Albanians without citizenship were not interned and sought to become naturalised. Many Albanians from Shepparton abandoned the idea of returning to Europe and sought naturalisation as British subjects. During the war, the federal government placed restrictions on enemy aliens and their naturalisation. Applications took time to process because authorities investigated whether applicants had broken any laws. By 1943, immigration restrictions were eased for certain Albanians who had proven to be "pro–British" and some were naturalised. In 1944, communist partisans took control of Albania from Axis German forces and Australia redesignated its Albanian community from "enemy aliens" to "friendly aliens". That year, the last Albanians held in internment were freed.

Unlike the Germans or Italians, who were considered a major wartime threat in Australia, government authorities treated Albanians in a fair and mainly even-handed manner regarding internment and later naturalisation. This was due to demand for Albanian labour, their status as European stock who did not pose a direct threat to the British Empire, and religion did not play a role in their wartime treatment.

==== Albanian contribution to the Australian war effort ====
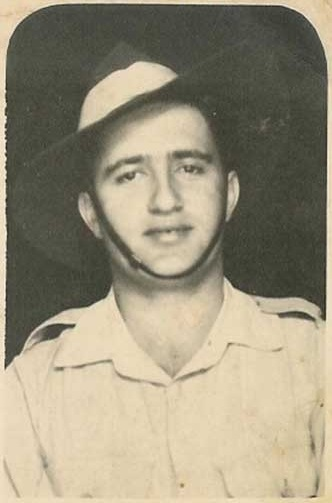
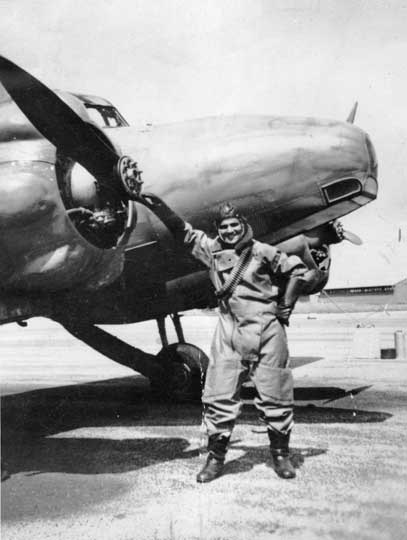
Albanians serving in the Australian army and air–force during WWII

The Albanian community were concerned they may be viewed in Australia as having dual loyalties and often made contributions to show their support for the war effort. Throughout the war, Albanians donated money to the war effort as an ethnic bloc because the community viewed Albanian and Australian interests as one. Albanians felt their contribution was one of changing their status from migrant group to a community integrated in Australia. These efforts were acknowledged in Australia and admired by the press, although media representations and political stances remained unchanged toward Albanians. Shepparton Albanians founded the Free Albanian Association (1943–1946), which raised money for the Australian Red Cross and supported the integration of the Albanian community into Australian society and their acceptance as Australians. During the war, Albanians in Australia were able to maintain contact with family in Albania, mainly through the Red Cross.

Displays of loyalty by Albanians resulted in authorities allowing over 30 Albanian–born men to enlist and serve in the Australian army during the war, a majority of whom were Muslim. Some Albanians served in Australia in combat-support roles and in the Battle of Darwin. Other Albanians were sent to the Middle East and the Pacific theatre; they were stationed in combat divisions and fought in Papua New Guinea and elsewhere; a few of them died oversees. Some Albanian men were decorated for their war service.

=== Post–war immigration ===
==== Influx of refugees and the Cold War ====
In the early decades of their migration to Australia, the lives of migrant Albanians were based on hard work in isolated conditions with simple living standards. After the war ended in August 1945, previous economic and social difficulties, and their wartime treatment by the government prompted some migrants to leave Australia and return to Albania. Returnees numbered 268, the majority departed in the late 1940s and others continued to leave until 1963. Most men remained in Australia and naturalisation became a goal to prevent any recurrence of their wartime experience.

At the war's conclusion, the communist takeover of Albania was positively received by the Albanian community but that stance changed with the onset of the Cold War. Australia was preferred over Albania due to the establishment of a communist government in the country. Some Albanian men with Australian citizenship initially persuaded their spouses or fiancés to migrate from Albania to Australia but Albania's post–war communist government implemented a policy of non–emigration, and families in Albania and Australia became separated. Border closures meant some of the men became trapped, though a few did escape the country. Families of migrants who tried and failed to leave were punished or subjected to hardship by the communist government, as were others with connections in the West. Unmarried Albanian migrants were no longer able to take prospective marriage partners from Albania to Australia.

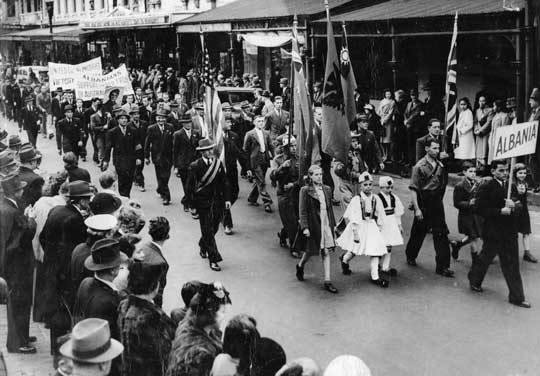
Albanians marching in post–WWII celebration march in Swanston Street, Melbourne (late 1940s)

By 1947, the number of Albanian migrants in Australia had doubled from that of 1933, and Victoria became the state with the largest Albanian population. A gender imbalance persisted; women formed only 10 percent of the Albanian population in 1947, increasing to 16 percent in 1954. From 1949 to 1955, 235 Albanian refugees escaping communist Albania migrated to Australia and became part of the Shepparton community. The refugees fled Albania to escape persecution; they were supporters of the anti–communist, royalist Legality Party and Balli Kombëtar, a political party active in Albania during the war. Other Albanian refugees from Yugoslavia moved to Australia from Kosovo and from south–western Macedonia's Prespa region. Albanians from Prespa settled in Melbourne and Perth, and travel to Albania only became possible with the conclusion of the Cold War decades later.

In the immediate post–war period, political differences of royalists and democrats among the Albanian community reflected political divisions of inter–war Albania and were at times expressed as separate gatherings and cultural events of the two groups. There were tensions between some Albanians who supported the Albanian communist government and others who opposed it. Over time, political differences subsided. Previous pro–union stances changed as the Cold War affected Albanians in rural areas, who opposed joining unions because they wanted to support individualism and prevent a perceived loss of freedom like the situation in Albania. Community members felt such actions were needed so the state would accept them as loyal Australian citizens.

==== Transition from "White Australia" to multiculturalism ====
Prior to the 1960s, most of the Albanian population in Australia had been born in Albania. As a result of the influx of Albanian refugees, Australia's Albanian-born population increased until 1976. From 1945 to the 1990s, the political environment in Albania interrupted and affected marriage customs among Albanian Australians, such as finding Albanian spouses and organising Albanian weddings. Some Albanian Australians resorted to marrying people from Albanian-populated areas of Yugoslavia and Turkey. Other Albanians in Australia married partners from different Muslim communities or non–Muslims.

Post–war Albanian migration, as with other Muslim immigrant communities, occurred during the transition from the White Australia Policy to a multicultural immigration policy; this shift was due to the arrival of post–war migrants of non–Anglo–Celtic origins. Multiculturalism was intended to deal with population influx, and allowed migrants to retain their culture and address difficulties migrants encountered in Australia regarding resources and services.

In the Australian context of notions about race and ethnicity, the settlement of Muslim Albanians during the White Australia policy period made them straddle classifications of White due to skin colour, and they were considered as "Other". Islam was not an impediment for Albanians migrating to Australia and undergoing the naturalisation process. Albanians built Mosques during the White Australia era. Later, with the official implementation of multiculturalism, the term "ethnic" was used to describe groups like Muslim Albanians as being "non–Anglo" or "other" in discourses about the policy by the majority Anglo–Australian population. Some in the Albanian community see their light–coloured skin and European heritage as factors that allowed them to integrate. Australian Albanians are at times deemed "invisible ethnics" and are mobile within the spectrum of "whiteness" as a result of them being accepted in Australia at certain points in Australian history. In Australian scholarship, reasons are given for the allowance of Albanians and their gradual acceptance in Anglo–Celtic Australia while still considered somewhat different or as "ethnics". They range from the Albanian presence being tolerated due to their small numbers, compatibility with the White Australia policy due to their light European complexion, filling labour shortages and not being of Asian origin.

==== Communities in Victoria ====
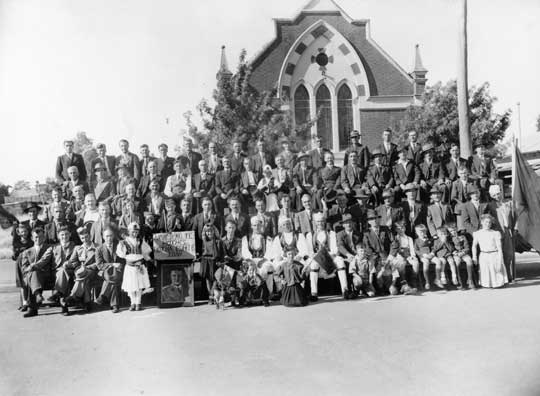
Albanian community celebration in Shepparton (late 1940s)

The Australian census of 1947 recorded 227 Shepparton Muslims, most of whom were from an Albanian background. In local media, negativity toward post–war Shepparton Albanians sharply decreased and they were depicted as hard–working people with civic participation in the town. In the early 1950s, Shepparton Albanians established their own Albanian Muslim Society and fund-raised in their community, and built Victoria's first mosque in the late 1950s. In the 1950s, Albanians partook in the revival of Islamic life within Australia, creating networks and institutions for the community. Religious and social survival prompted Albanians, like other Muslims of different ethnic backgrounds who were geographically dispersed, to co–operate on social projects through Muslim associations.

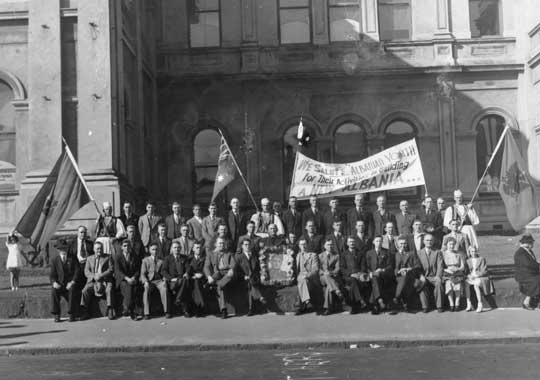
Albanian community group outside Trades Hall, Melbourne (late 1940s)

The Islamic Society of Victoria (ISV) was established in the late 1950s; its first head was an Albanian and during the early 1960s Albanians comprised most of its membership. The multicultural organisation laid foundations for Muslim groups like the Albanians to individually create Muslim facilities and infrastructure for their growing communities. Albanians based in Melbourne established their own Albanian Muslim Society and constructed the city's first mosque in the late 1960s. In the same decade, a multicultural Muslim women's association was established in Carlton North; its membership included Albanian women. Albanian radio was established in Melbourne by Bahri Bregu and Luk Çuni. In 1974, an Albanian Catholic Society was established and in 1993, the Australian Albanian Women's Association was created.

During the 1990s, migration programmes were set up in the Goulburn Valley to aid with Albanian family reunifications and the sponsoring of migrants. An estimated 100 Albanian families migrated to Shepparton after the collapse of communism in Albania. Coming from the same region in Albania, they joined the older Shepparton Albanian community which, as family contacts, sponsored their work visas, and gave them support through social networks and often employment. Some of the new Albanian arrivals were able to gain Australian citizenship through descent from earlier migrant forebears with Australian citizenship who had been unable to leave Albania following the Second World War. Shepparton Albanians became a well–integrated and financially successful community, with many employed as market gardeners and orchardists.

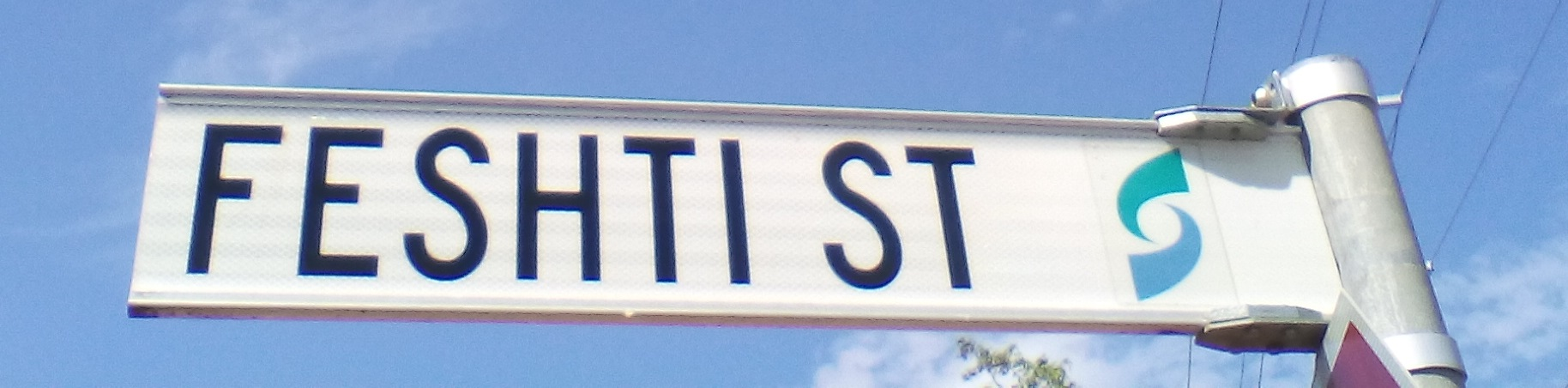
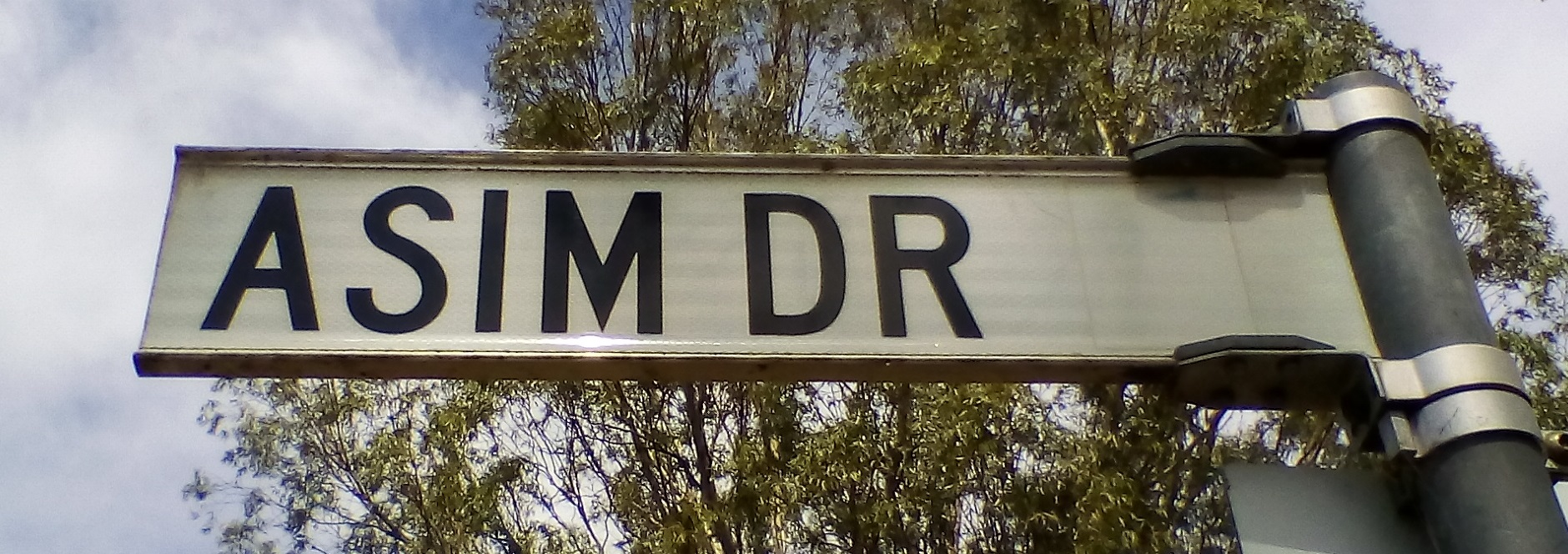
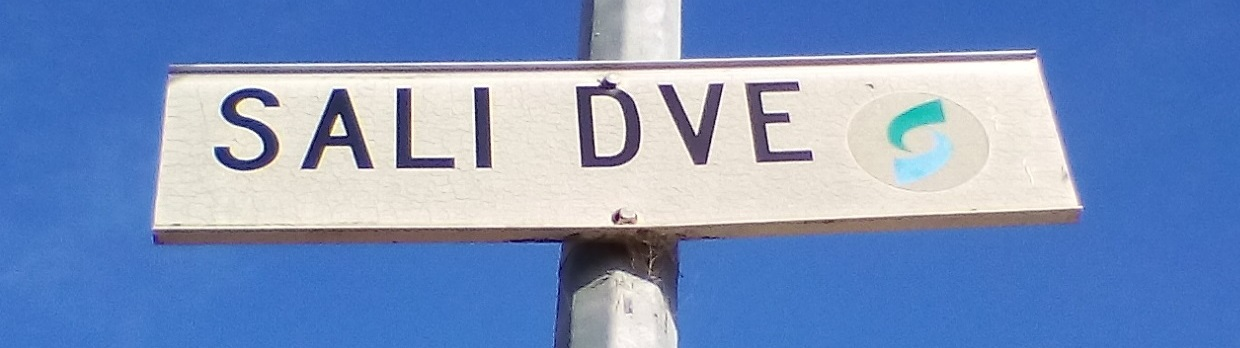
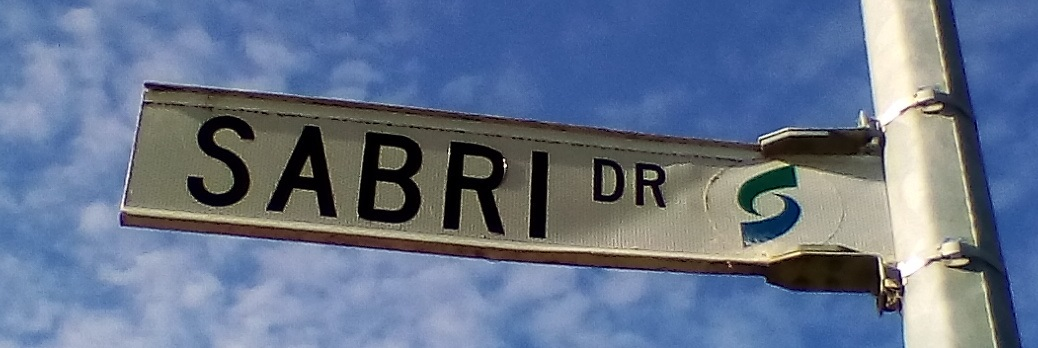
Shepparton streets named after notable local Albanian Australians

The Albanian presence in Shepparton is "well known and well regarded". Some history books about Shepparton document the importance of the Albanian contribution to its growth and development. They include accounts of tomato farmer Sam Dhosi, landowner Golë Feshti, orchardist Sam Sali, and Ridvan (Riddy) Ahmet and his brother who founded a business transporting fresh produce to Melbourne and later dominating the market. Notable figures from the local Albanian community have been honoured in Shepparton for their achievements with streets named after them. These are Feshti Street for Golë Feshti, Asim Drive for Ismet Asim—a young Albanian migrant who later owned orchards and a dairy farm—and others such as Sabri Drive, Sam Crescent and Sali Drive.

==== Communities in Queensland ====
In Queensland, Albanians purchased land in the tobacco–growing region around Mareeba and others in the corn-growing region of the Atherton Tablelands. In Mareeba, the older community was joined by post–war Albanian refugees, and other Albanians settled in Brisbane and sugar-cane-growing areas such as Cairns and Babinda. From the 1940s to the 1960s, some Albanians moved to live and work in forest-and-farm areas Kenilworth, Caboolture, Jimna, Beerwah and the Glasshouse Mountains. Apart from individual Albanians, work on tobacco and sugar cane farms often involved whole families. Albanians took their experience of working in rural environments and significantly contributed to the state's farming sector.

Newly arrived Albanians in Mareeba sought to preserve traditions suppressed under communism in Albania. As such, the wider Mareeba Albanian community established their own local Muslim Society and built a mosque dedicated to Australian soldiers who had died in wars. A few Albanians in Brisbane helped establish a multicultural Muslim organisation, the Islamic Society of Queensland, in the late 1950s.

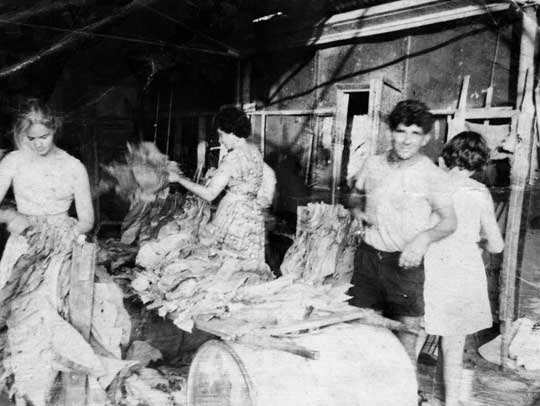
Albanian family grading tobacco in Mareeba, 1953

From their arrival, the Albanian Mareeba community has maintained good relations with the local Anglo–Celtic Australian population, even during the Second World War, as both groups share a similar rural lifestyle and interests. In 1976, there were 98 adult Muslims with an Albanian origin in Mareeba. A few local Albanians have risen to leadership roles such as becoming directors of North Queensland Tobacco Growers' Co–operative Association, which campaigned for tobacco growers' interests. Young people among the community have preferred employment in urban centres. Among Albanian communities within Australia, reverence is maintained for its financial contribution to the World War Two effort and its Australian war veterans. Through their community organisations, Albanians have participated in annual ANZAC Day commemorations at the war memorial.

==== Communities in other states ====
After the end of the Second World war, some Muslim migrants from Albania went to live in Western Australia, in particular to Fremantle and in Perth, settling near the old city mosque alongside other Muslims. In Perth, Albanians were involved in establishing the Muslim Society of Australia in the late 1940s. Other post–war Muslim Albanian migrants went to live in Northam and York, the state's wheat–and–sheep–farming regions, and worked as gardeners and farmers. In South Australia, the postwar Albanian community became interconnected with other Muslim migrants through Islamic community societies. The state had 150 Albania-born people and 300 of Albanian descent in 1993. By the 1990s, small numbers of Albanians had settled in Darwin, Northern Territory. In New South Wales, soon after 1945, a small number of Albanians settled in Sydney. Others went to live in Wollongong, where over 200 people are of Albanian descent.

=== Immigration from south–western Yugoslavia ===
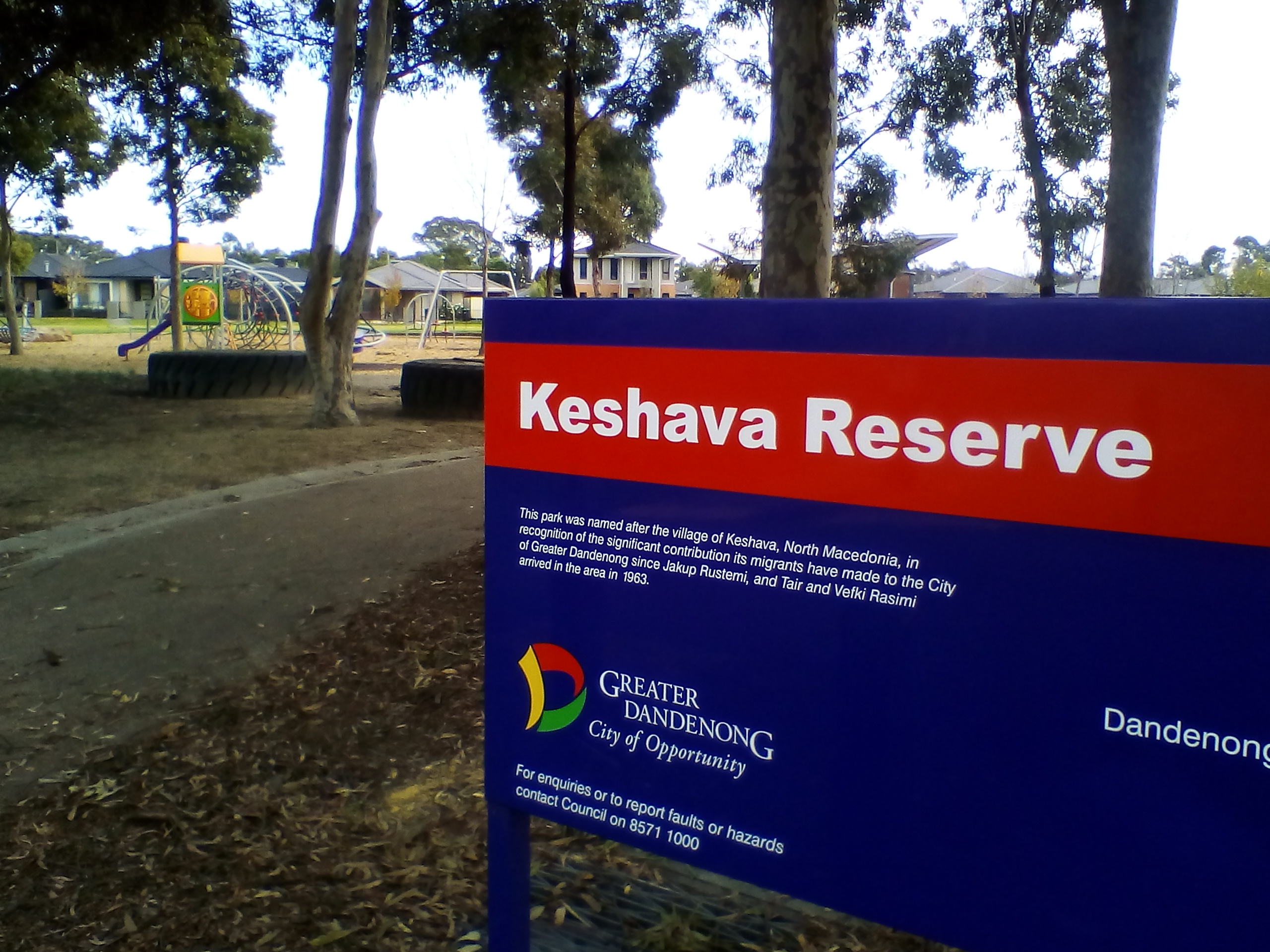
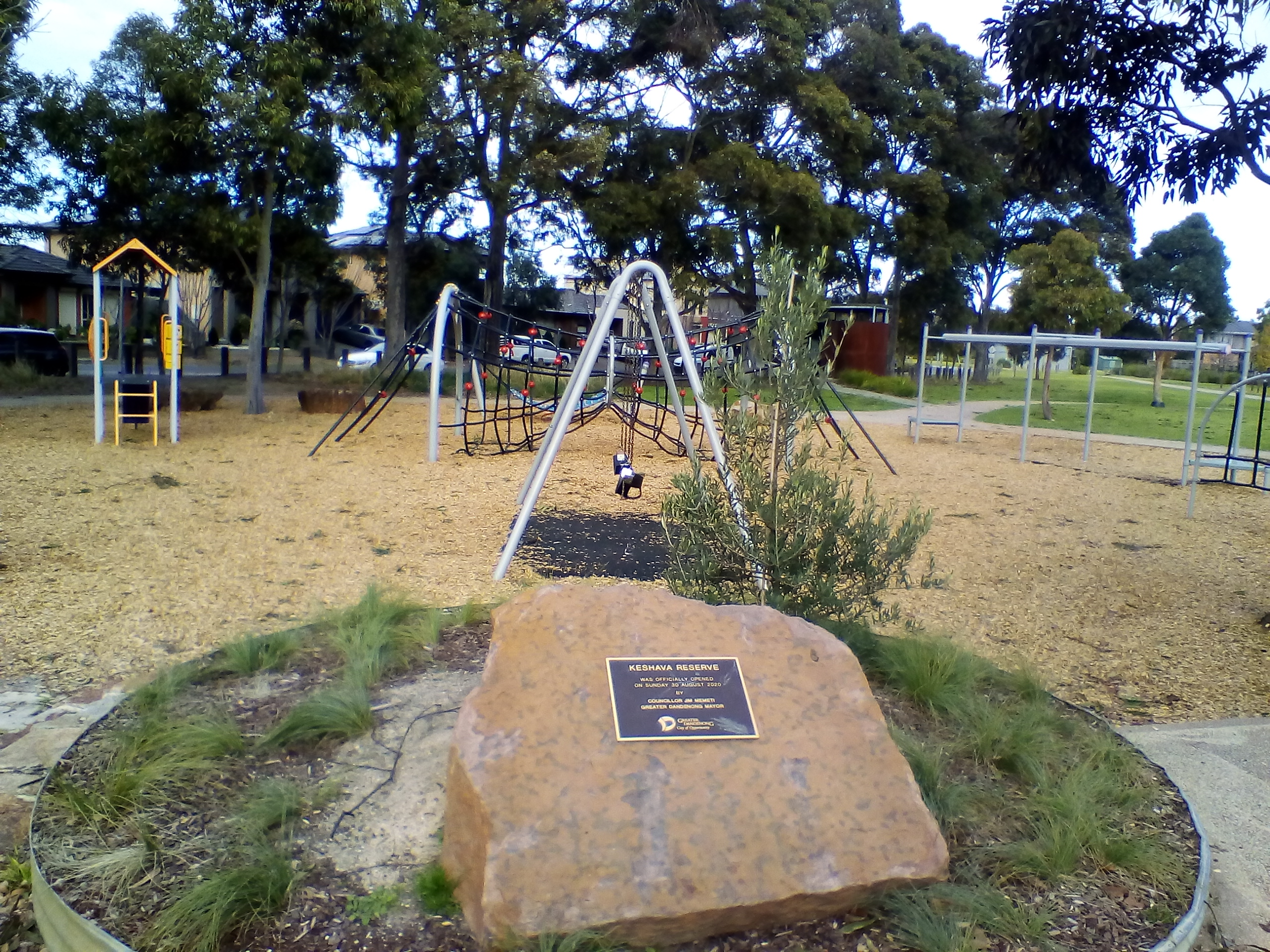
Keshava Reserve, a park named after Kišava (Albanian: Këshavë) to honour Albanian migrants from the village and their contribution to Dandenong

The majority of Albanian–speaking arrivals in Australia migrated from Yugoslavia beginning in the 1950s. During the 1960s and 1970s, most of these migrants were from the Lake Prespa region, and the villages Kišava and Ostrec in Bitola municipality, all of which are now part of south–western North Macedonia. Many left Yugoslavia due to discrimination against the ethnic Albanian minority and Muslim population, and the deteriorating economy and rise in unemployment.

==== Settlement in Dandenong ====
In 1963, Jakup Rustemi and later the brothers Tahir and Vefki Rasimi became the first Albanians to settle in the Melbourne suburb Dandenong after migrating from Kišava. Chain migration by Albanians from Kišava led to other friends and family migrating to Australia. Migrating Albanians with mainly agricultural skills chose to settle in Dandenong because it had industry and farms nearby. Local Albanians formed an Albanian soccer club in the suburb in 1984. A mosque was built by the Dandenong Albanian community in 1985. As the Dandenong Albanian community became settled and grew, they lacked a voice and representation, and their interests were not a focus of local and state government until the mid–2000s.

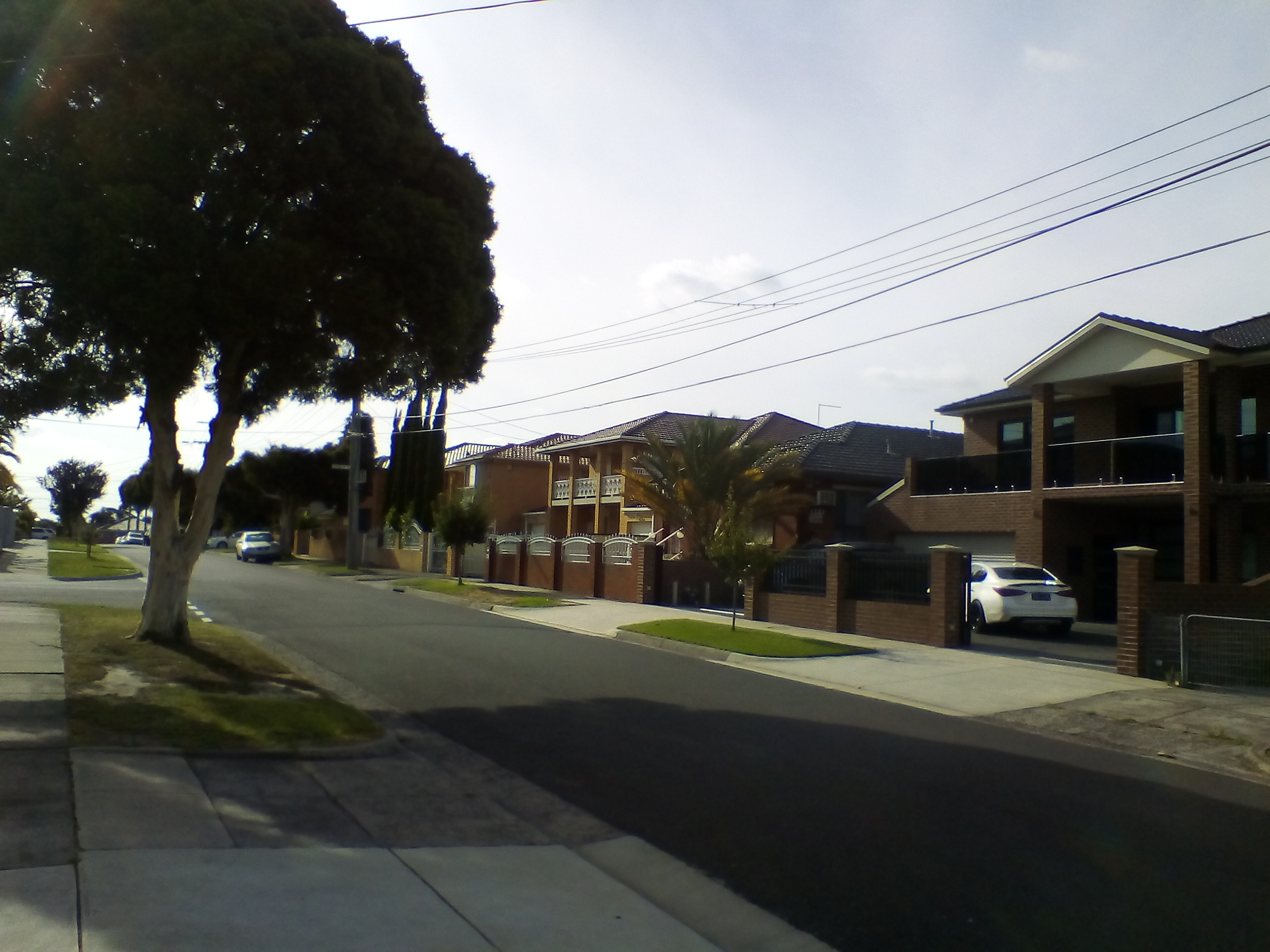
Residential streetscape in Dandenong in area of compact Albanian settlement

Over time, Dandenong became a centre for arriving Albanian migrants from southern Yugoslavia, and the suburb attracted Albanians from other parts of Australia who wanted to be in an Albanian community. Albanians also live in the neighbouring small suburb Dandenong South; they comprise much of its population and supply much of the kindergarten and school populations in the Dandenong area. Two–storey houses are a common feature among many Albanian homeowners in Dandenong, and often they make up most of the population in some streets. Many Albanian households are extended or multigenerational families that contribute to preserving traditions and the Albanian language. Some features of Albanian life in Dandenong are the speaking of Albanian, the playing of Balkan music, Albanian cuisine and local Albanian businesses.

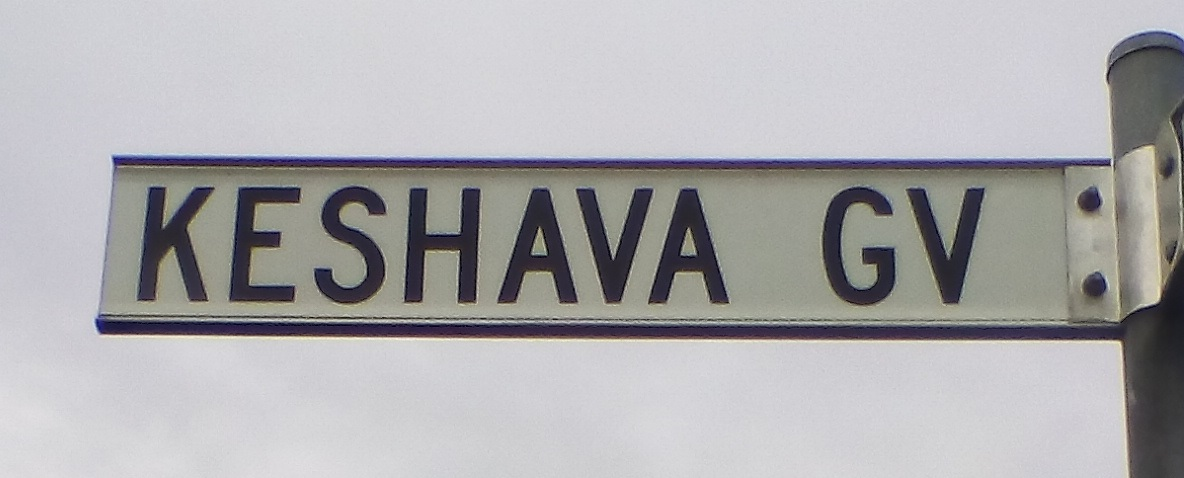
Keshava Grove, a street in Dandenong named after Kišava (Këshavë)

Albanians in Dandenong consider themselves to be integrated and accepted in Australia. Dandenong Albanians are employed in the flower-growing industry, working in nearby flower farms. Dandenong Albanians own over 40 flower and vegetable farms on Dandenong's suburban outskirts and 100 businesses in Dandenong itself. Many women also employed, although a sizable number are housewives focusing on child rearing. Following the opening of the borders of Albania in 1991, there was a rise in marriages by Dandenong Albanians mainly from Macedonia to Albanians from Albania. The Albanian presence in Dandenong has been honoured with a street called Keshava Grove and the creation of a public park named Keshava Reserve in 2020.

==== Other settlement in Melbourne ====
Because these migrants are from the same Tosk dialect group, they were able to integrate with earlier immigrants from the Korçë area. The Albanian migrants shared historical, social and cultural connections, and intermarriage that allowed the forming of strong bonds of community in Australia. The Albanian Prespa community and Albanians from the Bitola region form the majority of the Albanian community in Victoria and Australia. In 1991, they numbered 5,401.

Industrial, working–class suburbs in Melbourne are the main areas of Albanian settlement for Bitola Albanians—most of whom live in Dandenong—and Prespa Albanians, most of whom live in Yarraville, St Albans, Altona, Preston, Lalor and Thomastown. Within the context of migration, maintaining identity and adapting to a new homeland, Albanians from the Lake Prespa region refer to Australia as Australia shqiptare (Albanian Australia) or Australia prespane (Prespan Australia). As a consequence of the Albanian migratory outflow from the region, the Prespa diaspora communities in Australia and the US are larger than the remaining Albanian Prespa population in Macedonia.

=== The 1990s, Kosovo War and aftermath ===
According to the 1996 Australian census, in that year, Albanian Australians were mainly employed in the agriculture, services and production industries as labourers and tradespeople, and smaller numbers as professionals, with less than a quarter being unemployed. The Albanian language was spoken by 6,212 people in Australia in 1996, a five–fold increase over people born in Albania. Of that number, 1,299 were born in the Republic of Macedonia, and 60 in Serbia and Montenegro.

The Albanian community in Australia has mostly attracted little attention to itself, only coming to national attention during the disintegration of Yugoslavia and the resulting Kosovo crisis of the 1990s. During the Kosovo War (1999), the Australian government conducted Operation Safe Haven and gave temporary asylum to 4,000 Kosovo Albanians by housing them in military facilities, although Albanian Australians offered to house the refugees. The event provoked change in Australian government policy toward refugees by offering temporary asylum rather than permanent settlement. In Victoria, 1,250 Kosovo Albanians were housed at army bases at Puckapunyal in the Shepparton area and at Portsea, south from Dandenong. Local Albanians from both areas provided the refugees with support, and assisted them with interpreting and translation. Some Albanian community organisations and networks in Australia were involved assisting Kosovo Albanian refugees. Erik Lloga, a Melbourne–based Albanian community leader, led efforts and was the main interlocutor between the Australian government and refugees.

After the war ended, most Albanian refugees were returned to Kosovo in 2000; 500 of them were able to permanently remain in Australia after attaining refugee status, increasing the numbers of Albanian Australian community. It was the last main phase of immigration to Australia by Albanians. Albanian Australians, in areas where they are concentrated, and their organisations, assisted the Kosovars with resettlement. Small numbers of Kosovo–and–Montenegro–born Albanians settled in Mareeba, where Albanian Australians form most of its Muslim population. In Queensland, Kosovo Albanians form one third of its Albanian population, and are employed as carpenters and painters or in other labour trades, while the youth pursue professions in law, health and engineering.

=== Twenty–first century ===
In the early twenty–first century, a majority of Albanians in Australia live in Victoria. At Shepparton, the Albanian community numbers around 3,000, the overwhelming majority of whom have origins in or around Korçë, Albania. In Dandenong, the Albanian community numbers between 4,000 and 6,000, most of whom originated from Kišava and its surrounding area in North Macedonia. In both places, some Albanians have origins in Montenegro and Kosovo, and in Dandenong some have origins in Albania. Most Albanians in Shepparton and Dandenong are Muslims.

Australia-wide, the 2006 Australian census counted 2,014 residents who were born in Albania and 11,315 with Albanian ancestry. In 2011, the census counted 2,398 Albanian-born residents and 13,142 with Albanian ancestry. The 2016 census also counted 4,041 people born in Albania or Kosovo and 15,901 with Albanian ancestry. The 2024 census recorded 3,633 residents born in Albania with 19,686 indicating Albanian ancestry.

	2006	2011	2016	2021
Albanian born (includes Kosovo from 2016)	2,014	2,398	4,041	5,109
Albanian ancestry	11,315	13,142	15,901	19,686
	-	+1827	+2759	+3785

Some Albanian Australians have found it difficult to sponsor Albanians for migration from the Balkans to Australia because they do not have the required English–language skills. Australian immigration rules tightened in the early twenty–first century and marriage has become the main option for migration to Australia by Albanians from the Balkans. The end of communism in Albania and the breakup of Yugoslavia restarted the tradition of some second-and-third-generation Albanian Australians marrying Albanians from their places of origin in the Balkans. Limited numbers of Albanian migrants have also arrived through Australian humanitarian, refugee and skilled migration programmes.

In Victoria, Albanian Australians including Jim Memeti, who served as City of Greater Dandenong mayor, and Dinny Adem and Shane Sali as mayors of the City of Greater Shepparton, have risen to political leadership roles. Between late 2007 and early 2008, an exhibition named "Kurbet" (migration) on the experiences of Albanians migrating to Australia was displayed at the Immigration Museum in Melbourne. For several years, Shepparton Albanians through their Islamic Society campaigned for Shepparton and Korçë to establish a twin-town relationship, a goal achieved in 2013. During December 2019, Albanian Australians raised $255,000 through their community organisations for victims of the 2019 Albania earthquake.

In Victoria in the early 2020s, the effects of the COVID-19 pandemic were felt by Victorian Albanians as community events like Albanian festivals were cancelled. During August 2020 in Dandenong, around 100 individuals, mostly from the Albanian community, partook in the first protests against Victoria's lockdowns that aimed at curbing the COVID-19 pandemic. In late 2021, the pandemic severely affected the Albanian community in Melbourne when around 300 people became infected with the virus.

The Shepparton Albanian community produced Australia My Home: An Albanian Migration, a documentary about Albanian migration to Australia. In 2022 it has been shown in film festivals in Australia, the US and Albania, and won awards.

== Demographics ==
In the early twenty–first century, Victoria has the highest concentration of Albanians in Australia, and smaller Albanian communities exist in Western Australia, South Australia, Queensland, New South Wales and the Northern Territory. In 2021, 5,109 persons resident in Australia identified themselves as having been born in Albania or Kosovo, while 19,686 persons identified themselves as having Albanian ancestry, either alone or in combination with another ancestry. Albanian was the language of the household for 10,851 people. According to Australian Albanian societies, they state the number of Albanians in the country is under reported.

=== Language ===
Albanian Australians use the Tosk and Gheg dialects of the Albanian language. In Shepparton, Albanian language use had declined among a large number of Albanian Australians to the point it was barely used and no longer spoken. An influx of Albanian migrants from Albania to Shepparton in the 1990s led to a revival of Albanian among the earlier group of Shepparton Albanians who wanted to reconnect with their heritage through the language.

In the late twentieth century, the ages of those proficient in the Albanian language among Albanian Australians ranged from infants to the elderly; proficiency was maintained by the second generation and the language was spoken by more–recent migrant arrivals of the time. From 1986 to 1996, use of the Albanian language increased by a quarter and some elderly migrants were not fluent in English.

In the early twenty–first century, most Albanian Australians from the second and third generations speak English as their primary language. Some of the young can understand Albanian but may be reluctant to use it and prefer to speak English. Some Albanian households are heavily involved in efforts towards ensuring the transmission and maintenance of the Albanian language by their children in Australia.

In the twentieth century, Albanian migrants established Sunday schools to teach Albanian. The first Albanian school was established by Bahri Bregu and Luk Çuni. Its inaugural Albanian–language class was held in 1964 and taught by its first teacher Mithat Jusufi, an Albanian from Bitola who immigrated in 1961. In Victoria, continued support for maintaining the Albanian language has come from the education system through Victorian School of Languages (VSL) and community schools teaching languages. Albanian–language classes undertaken through the VSL system are held on the weekends in Shepparton, and the Melbourne suburbs Brunswick, Dandenong and Caroline Springs.

=== Religion ===
==== Islam ====
In the late twentieth century, 80% of Albanian speakers in Australia followed Islam. Because Islam is the dominant religion among Albanian Australians, it has given the community a sense of unity, and the capacity and resources to construct their own mosques, which have symbolised the Albanian community's permanent settlement in Australia. Mosques serve as centres for community activities and are important for retaining the religious identity of Albanian Australians.

Shepparton Mosque was the first mosque to be built in Victoria, and Carlton Mosque was the first to be built in Melbourne. Other mosques in metropolitan Melbourne are Dandenong Mosque and the Albanian Prespa Mosque in Reservoir. Mareeba Mosque was the second mosque in Queensland and the first in its rural interior. In Western Australia, Perth-based Albanians use Perth Mosque. Albanian representatives serve in most federal Islamic organisations and some are or have been in senior positions. In the few areas of concentrated Albanian settlement, their small numbers shaped local areas through the construction of mosques or becoming a sizable proportion of the school Muslim population. The infrastructure created by Albanian Australians has attracted Muslim migrants to areas that have an existing mosque or services assisting with settlement.

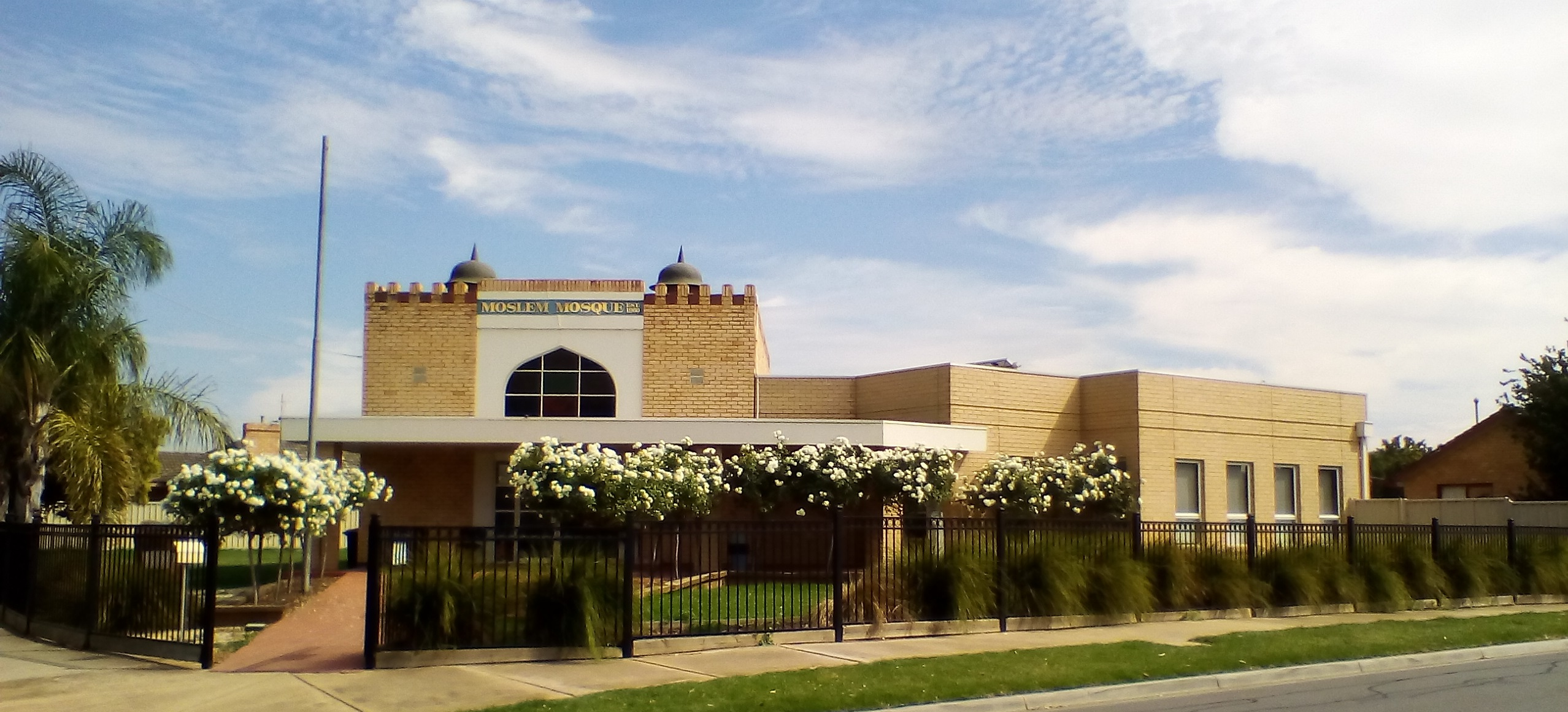
Shepparton Mosque

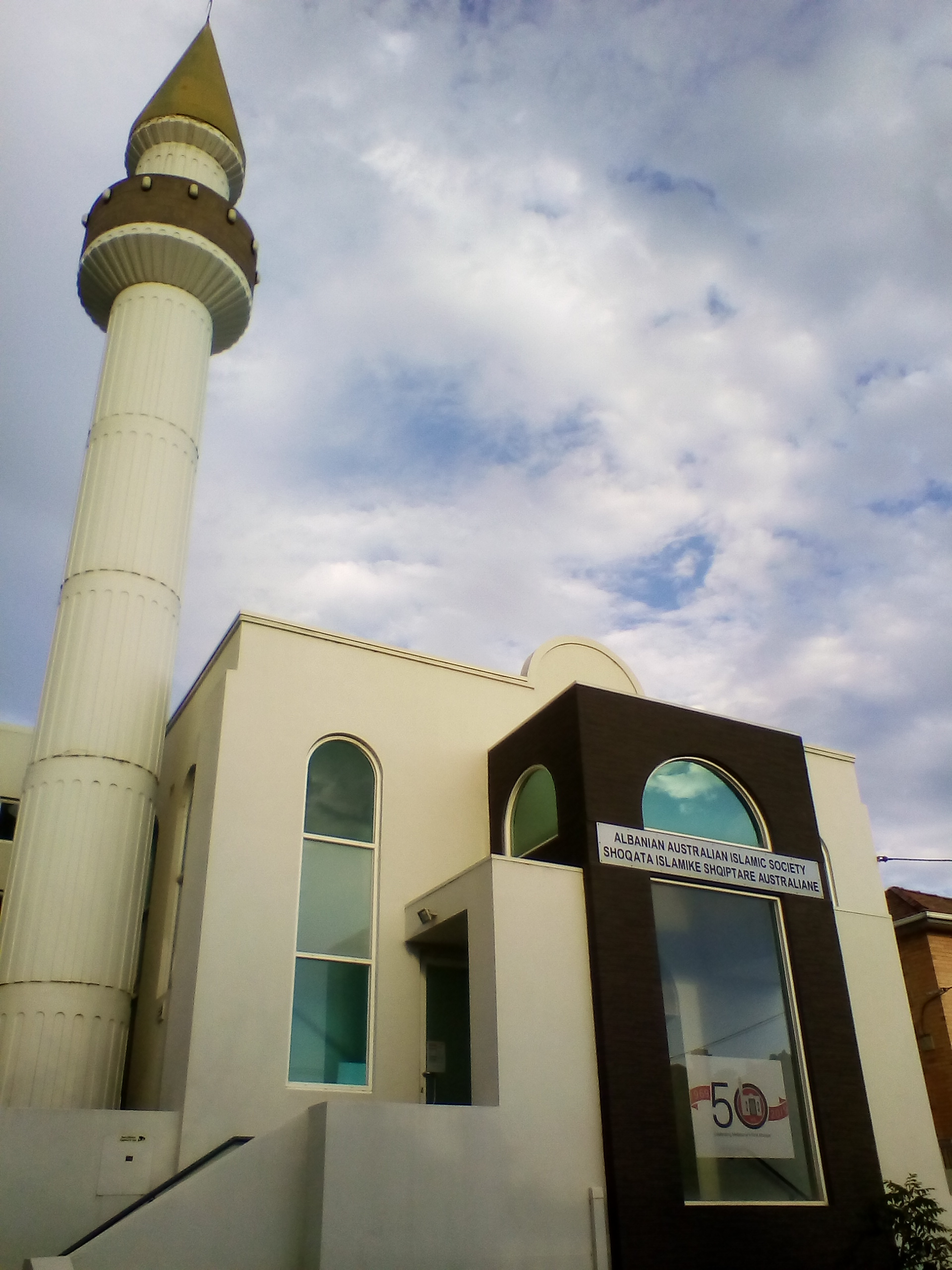
Carlton Mosque

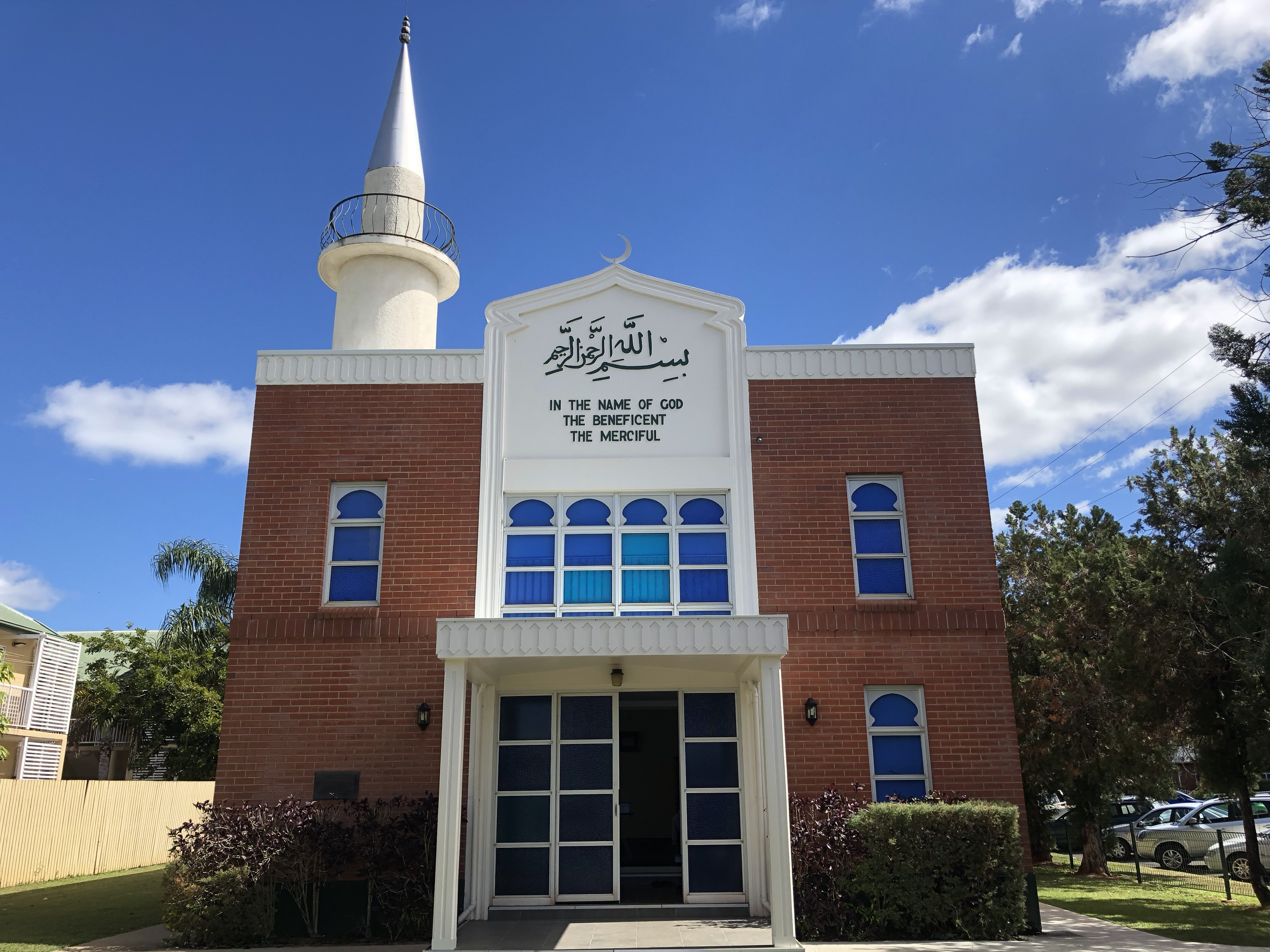
Mareeba Mosque

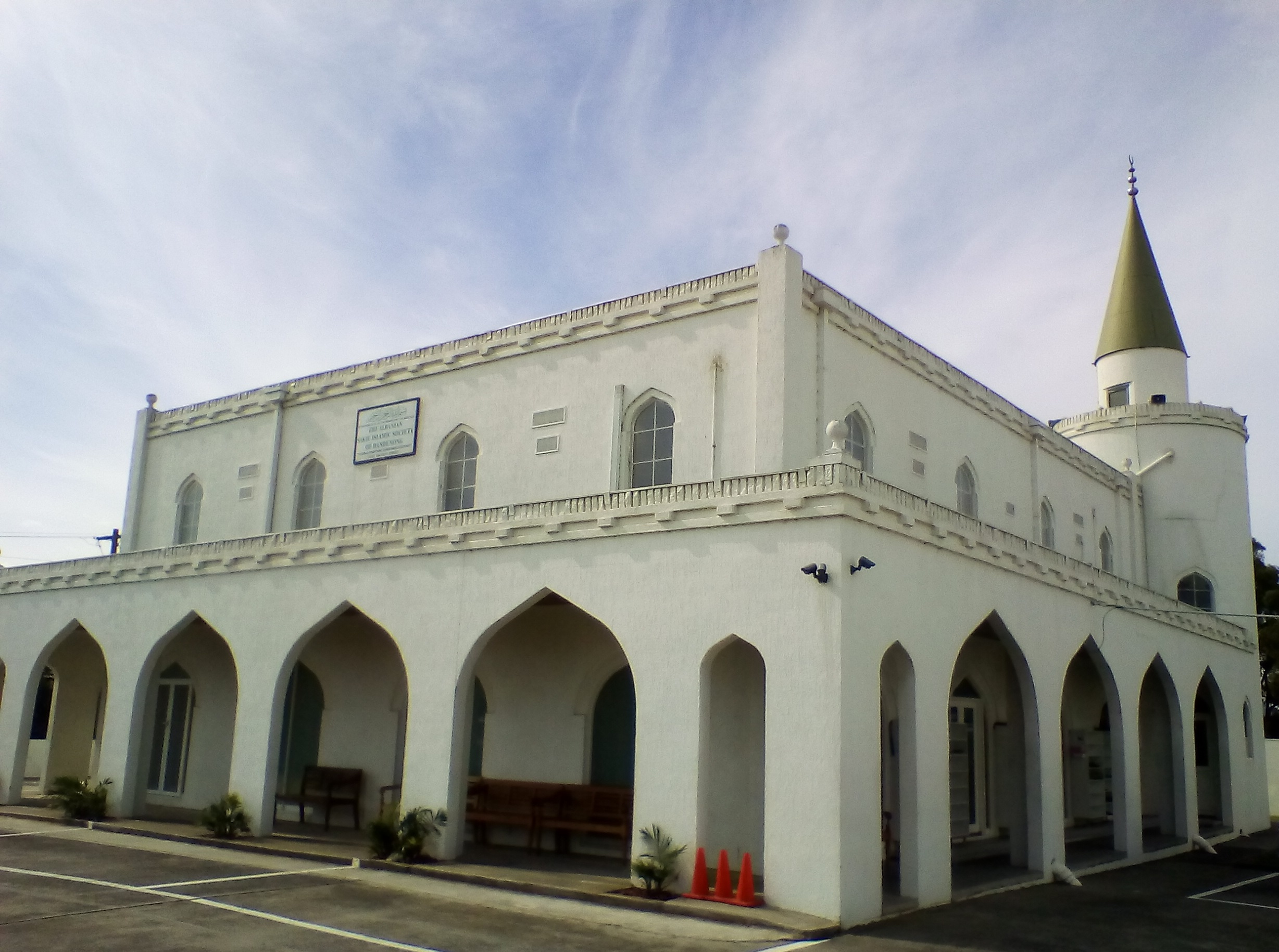
Dandenong Mosque

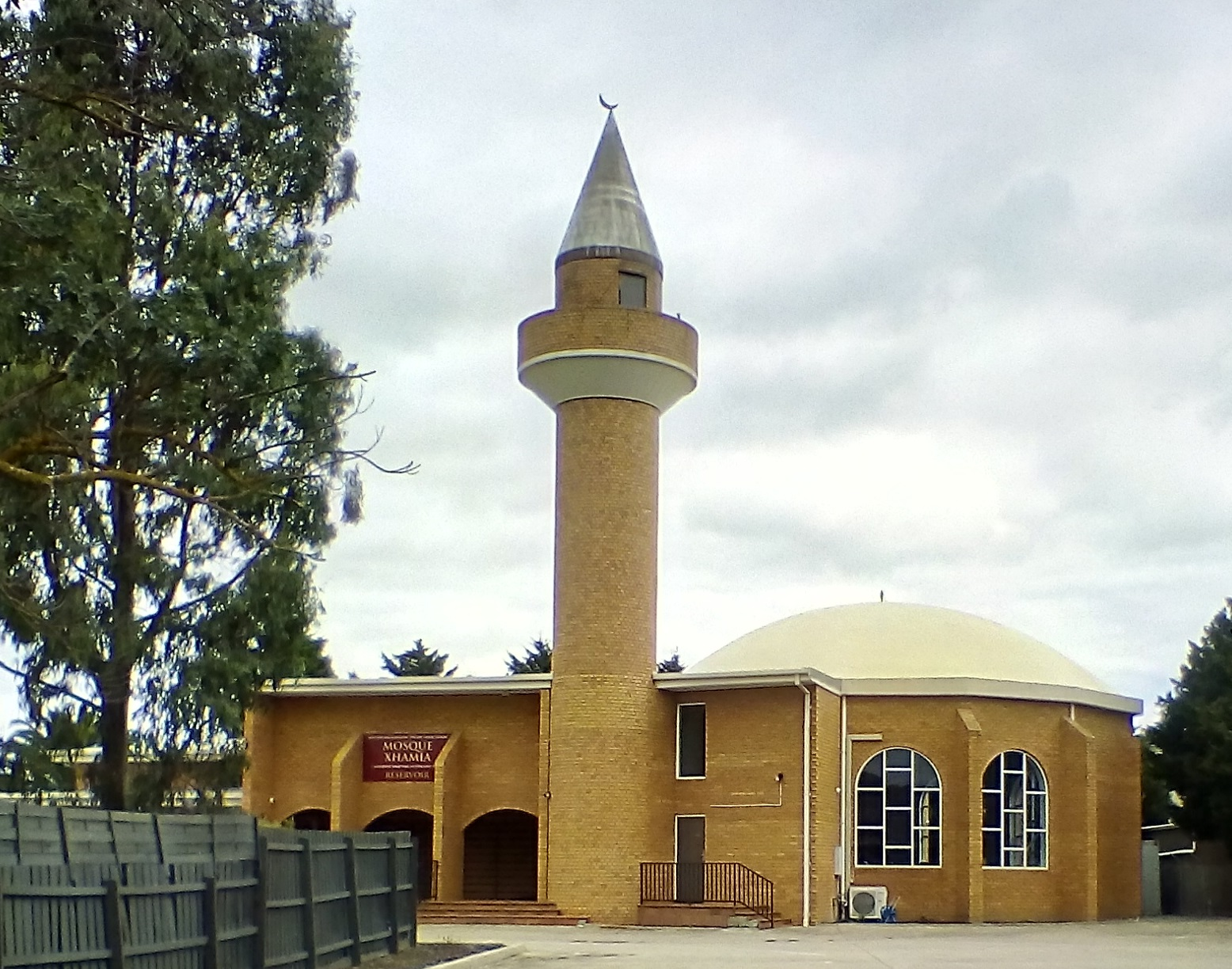
Reservoir Mosque

From the 1920s–1950s, Albanian identity was closely associated with being Muslim in Albanian communities like Shepparton; these were significant elements that contributed to their place in the country and established sentiments of community among its members. In the early twenty–first century, most Albanians in areas such as Shepparton and Dandenong are secular or non–observant Muslims, but there are also some devout Muslims. Australian Albanians perceive community as integrated into Australia, tolerant Muslims with relaxed religious practices and a "laid back" outlook on religion. Albanians believe a lack of religious knowledge does not diminish one's own Muslim identity.

A small number of Albanian women, mainly elderly individuals, wear Muslim head coverings, a practice that is considered acceptable by Albanian Australians. Among some Albanians, the month long Ramadan fast is lightly adhered to; the effort is seen as important rather than the completion of fasting requirements. Australian Albanians perform certain traditions such as the sacrificing of sheep to bring good luck by Albanian imams before the construction of a house, something other imams and mainstream Islam consider un–Islamic. In Shepparton, the present local Albanian community's practice of Islam is influenced by the legacy of Sufi Bektashism in Albania.

In the Albanian community, there has been some trepidation towards, and difficulty in relating to, newly arrived Middle–Eastern Muslims whose practice of Islam is often devout and visible. Sharing a European background has made Albanians more open to the British origins of a large part of the Australian population. A lack of commonality and the turbulent Balkan legacy have distanced Albanians from efforts by some non–Albanian Muslim bodies to supersede ethnic and national organisations for a unitary, Muslim–only approach to advocating for community interests. Albanians in Australia rarely attract attention to themselves due to a legacy of discrimination and persecution experienced in the Balkans under communism, either as minorities or from war.

Australian Census 2021 (Only for Albania-born)
1. No religion 33.1 (31.7%)
2. Islam 27.1 (25.9%)
3. Roman Catholicism 19.3 (18.5%)
4. Eastern Orthodoxy 11.9 (11.4%)
5. Other Christians 2.2 (2.11%)
6. Other Religions 6.3 (6.03%)
7. Undeclared 4.6 (4.40%)

Among Albanians, people identify as "Albanian" or "Australian", and the two identities are rarely distinguished between by community members unless they are recent migrants. Both identities are viewed as similar to each other by the Albanian community. Some segments of the Australian Muslim population regard Albanians as "white Muslims". In places like Shepparton where Albanians are concentrated, the broader, non–Muslim population view them as tolerant Muslims.

Differing views exist among the Albanian community over Islam. Those belonging to the pre-1950s migration flow view their connection to Islam as intact and "authentic", and consider the Islam of recent arrivals who lived under communist-imposed atheism as severed from their past and sense of self. A sizable number of Albanian migrants from post–communist Albania identify as Muslim but do not wish to openly associate themselves with Islam due to being in Australia. Among post–1991 Albanian migrants and some older community members and those who were raised in Australia view older members of the Albanian community who were cut off from Albania for decades as holding on to past practices that no longer exist in Albania.

Some young people and newer Albanian arrivals view the opinions of older generations linking Albania and Islam as a concern and incompatible with contemporary Australia. These young people and recent immigrants are not closely attached to Islam, neither do they see a connection between Islam and their nationality, and view expressions of an Islamic heritage as a negative in Australia due to negative media coverage of Muslims. Some Albanian Australians do not view being Muslim as a barrier to integration within the mainly Christian population of Australia. Some Albanians view Christianity as the "true" faith of the Albanian people whereas others see Islam and Albanian identity as intertwined.

==== Christianity ====
In the late twentieth century, 400 Albanian Australians were Catholic and 114 were Orthodox. Following their migration, Catholic and Orthodox Albanian Australians use existing religious institutions in Australia for their religious needs. Christian Albanian Australians have difficulties preserving their heritage due to a lack of Albanian churches and Albanian–speaking clergy in Australia. In April 2022, the Catholic Albanian community erected a statue of Saint Mother Teresa in Adelaide.

== Community and culture ==
Albanian Australians of Muslim and Christian backgrounds are united by a shared heritage and common Albanian identity. Religious differences have not been a significant factor in Albanian community relations. In Australia, social networks and relations in the context of a common language, family, migration and cultural practices play a significant role in influencing being Muslim and Albanian, and belonging to a community.

Among Albanian communities in Victoria, certain geographic and political designations have been carried over from the Balkan countries of origin to identify and differentiate between individuals. Places like Shepparton are identified with Albanians from the Korçë area of Albania, and Dandenong with Albanians from the Bitola area of North Macedonia. Other identity references exist for northerners and southerners, Albanians from pre– or post–communist Albania, Kosovar Albanians, cultural and linguistic differences, religion, and Albanians settled in other parts of Australia. With some exceptions in Dandenong, these complex social and identity markers among Albanian Victorians are not sources of contention. Similarities between Albanian communities are also highlighted and there is acceptance of differences along with the notion people self–identifying as Albanians form one cohesive group. People attending large social gatherings like community festivals and New Year parties are all identified as Albanian by Albanian Australians.

As the geopolitical situation has changed in both the Balkans and Australia, it has become increasingly difficult to identify differences among Albanians from their countries of origin like Albania, Macedonia, Kosovo and Montenegro. Many identify Albania as "home" when referring to an individual's heritage or the nation of origin, even if they had arrived from Montenegro or Macedonia. Connections to villages and urban centres in the Balkans from which Albanian Australians originated are maintained and are reflected in the social links between people and families in Australia, which are based on those places of origin.

There are efforts among Albanians to maintain some of their cultural traditions. Albanian cultural media such as Albanian television programmes and music, and local recordings of Albanian social events like large weddings are present in households. Other traditions such as the cultural concept of Besa continue to be observed.

=== Community organisations and clubs ===
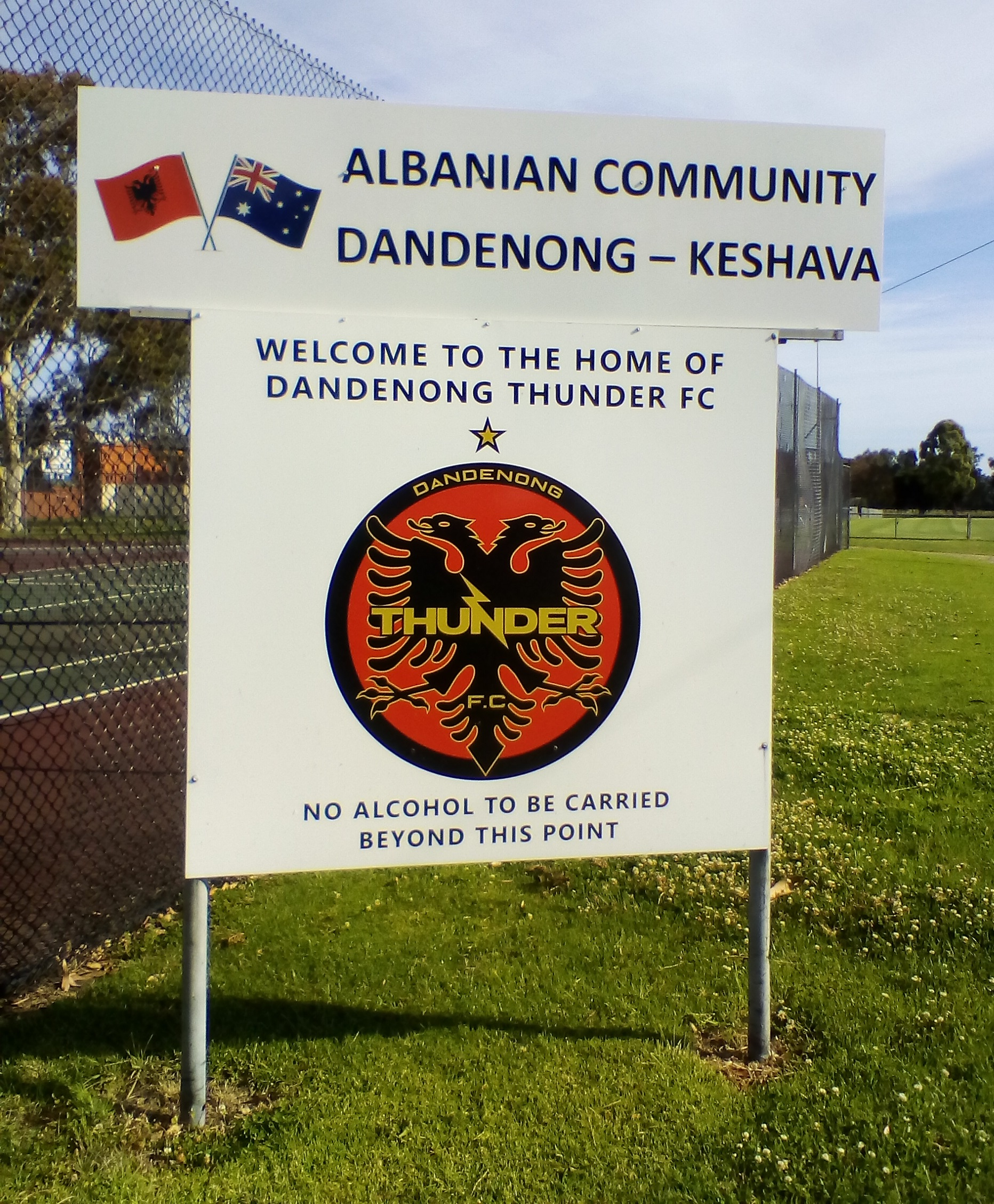
Dandenong Thunder sign marking entrance to soccer home ground

Albanian Australians have established community organisations, religious associations and sports clubs to cater for the needs of their geographically dispersed community. In Carlton North, Melbourne, is the Albania Australia Community Association (AACA) and Albanian Australian Islamic Society, which share the same premises. Other Albanian Islamic societies exist in Dandenong and Shepparton. An Albanian Catholic Society is based in St Albans. Other such organisations are the Albanian Teachers' Association, the Australian Albanian Women's Association, the Australian Albanian Prespa Association, the Australian Albanian Pensioners Association, and the United Albanians of Australia Association. The Albanian Folk Dance Group is based in Melbourne. A branch of the political party Balli Kombëtar, which was established by post–war refugees with anti–communist sentiments, was present in Victoria.

In Melbourne, Albanian Australians founded some of the city's soccer clubs. Dandenong Thunder is based in Dandenong and North Sunshine Eagles is in St Albans; other Albanian-founded teams are Heidelberg Eagles and South Dandenong.

An Albanian Association of Brisbane exists in Queensland; and in the rural interior is the Albanian Australian Moslem Society of Mareeba. In Adelaide, South Australia, there is an Albanian Australian Association, the Mother Teresa Albanian Catholic Society and Adelaide Albanian Folk Dance Group.

=== Cultural events ===
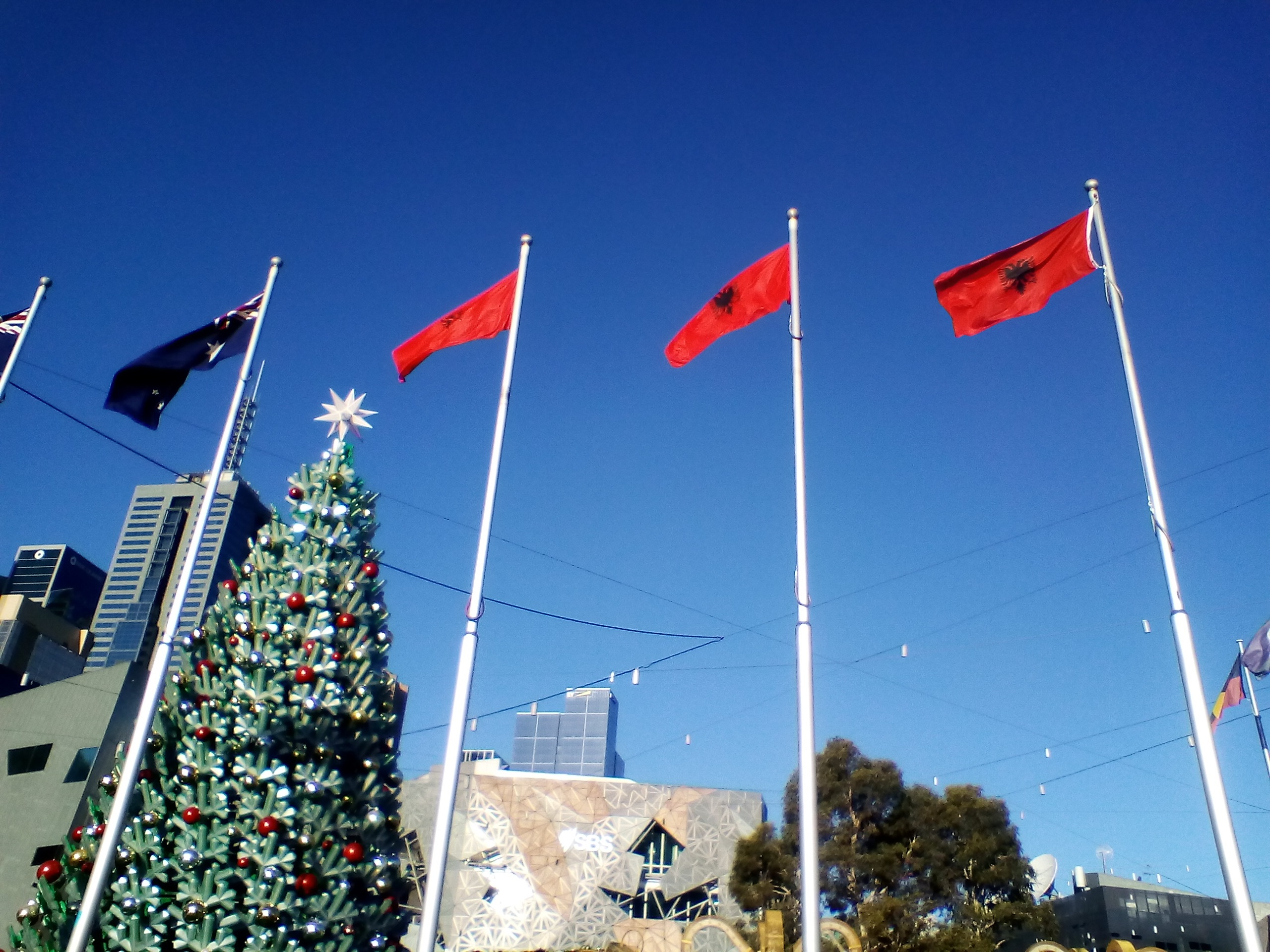
Albanian flags are annually flown in Federation Square, Melbourne, to mark Albania's Independence Day.

Festivals and other celebrations showcasing Albanian culture, music and food serve as reminders or links for Albanian Australians of their Albanian identity and ancestral past. They also serve to strengthen social networks and friendships. Albanians belonging to various generations, religions, affiliations and origins freely gather and associate at community cultural events celebrating Albania and its culture. Albanians in Australia celebrate Albanian Independence day (28 November), host and attend community New Year's celebrations and Albanian music concerts, and partake in other functions. Celebrations marking the conclusion of Ramadan are also a focal point for the community.

In Shepparton, events are organised by the local Albanian Islamic Society, which also holds the annual Albanian Harvest Festival at the Shepparton showgrounds; the event is attended by around 2,000 people, mainly Albanian Australians. In Dandenong, the Albanian–Australian Community Association organises community events; its annual Albanian festival is held in the Dandenong Ranges. The festival is held on the first Sunday in December and at times it has been also held in Melbourne's inner–western suburbs. Albanian music and dance feature at both festivals and the events attract Albanians from other areas of Victoria, and are important for connecting the dispersed Albanian community, families and friends.

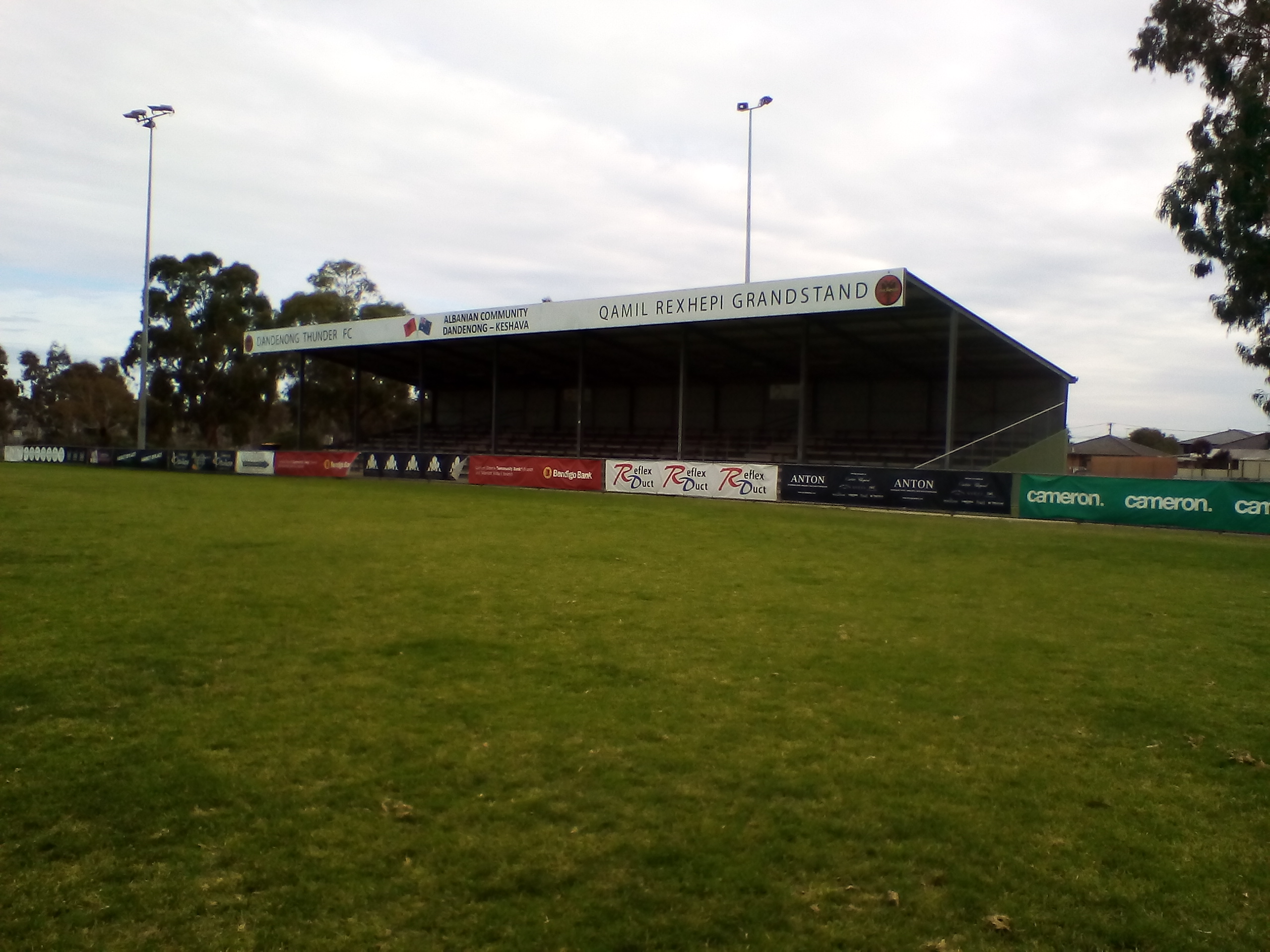
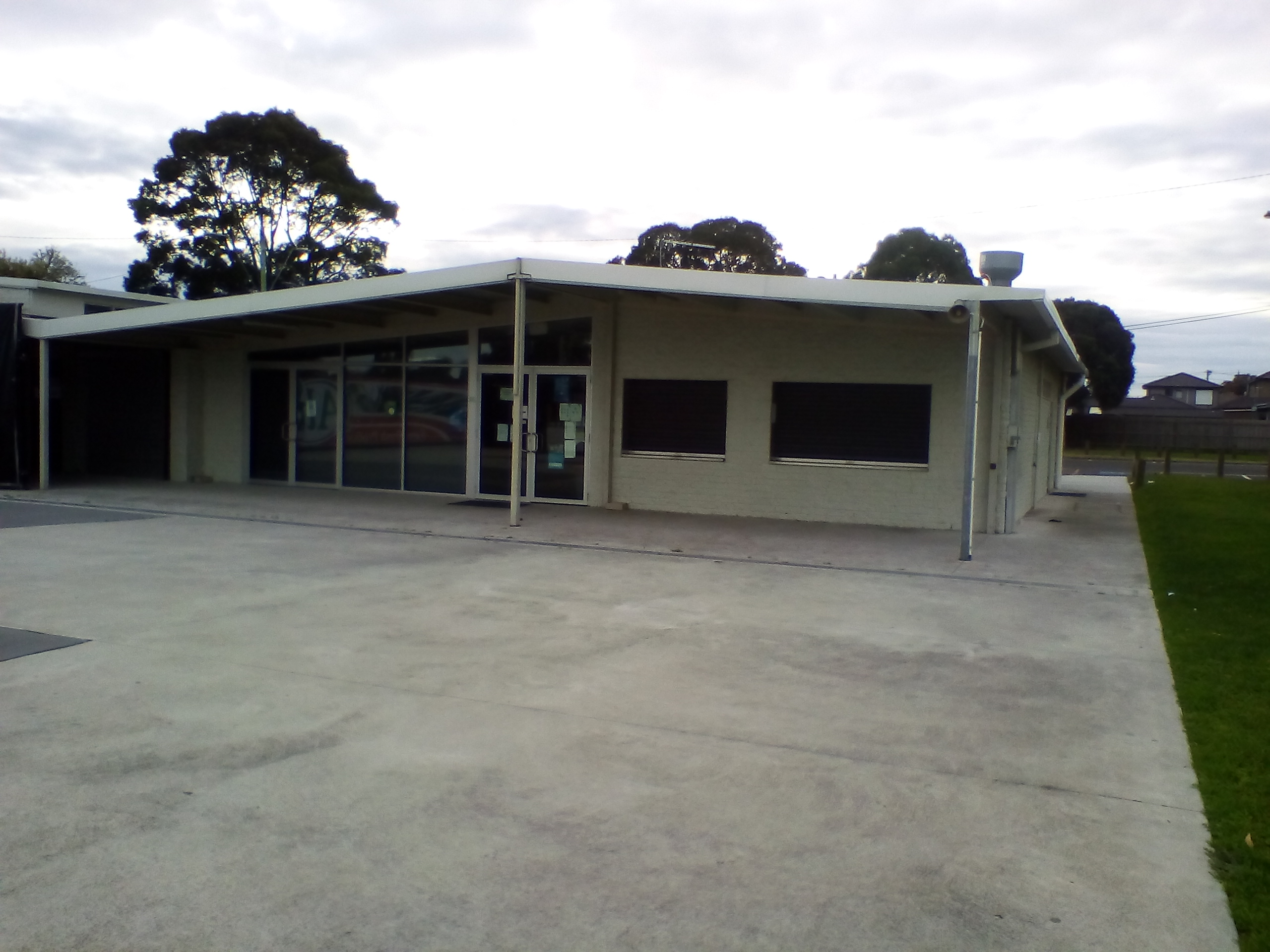
Dandenong Thunder soccer ground (left) and its clubhouse and ground (right)

The Albanian community sometimes participate in multicultural events like the Shepparton Festival in Shepparton and the Piers Festival in Dandenong. Albanian culture, including folklore, music, dance and national costume, is celebrated.

Events hosted by Albanian soccer clubs are important for socialisation between Albanians and people from the broader community. The club grounds of Dandenong Thunder are used by the Albanian–Australian Community Association for community events, such as music concerts featuring Albanian performers from the Balkans. The club grounds also hosts the Qamil Rexhepi Cup, which is played each January between Melbourne–based Albanian soccer clubs. In Dandenong, Albanian men socialise at the coffee shop and gym, and Albanian women socialise at other women's houses, the shopping centre, the park and the swimming pool.

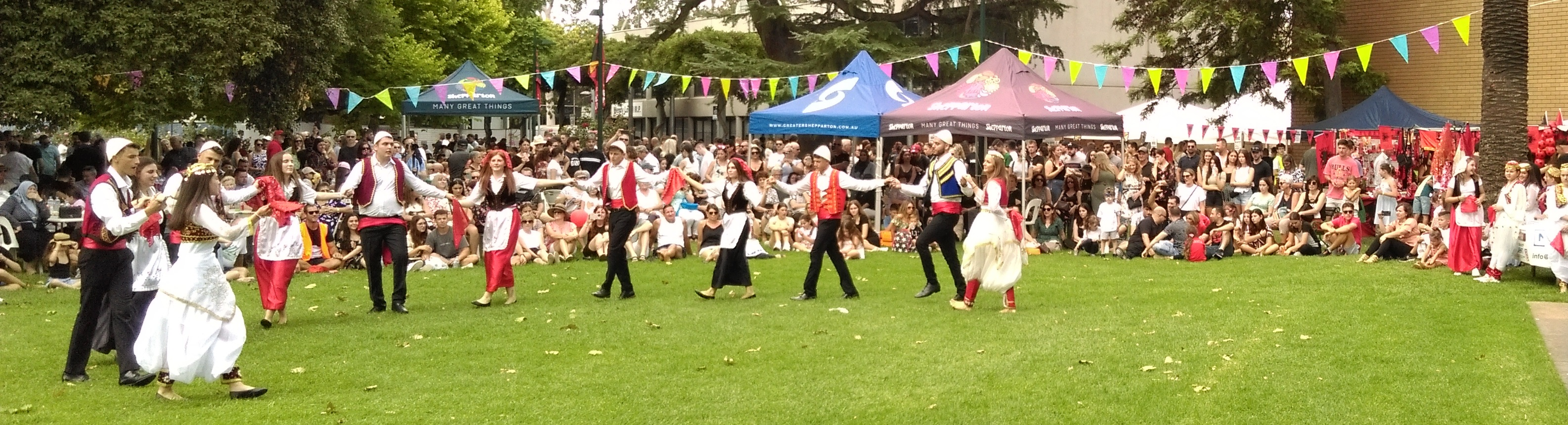
Shepparton Albanian Harvest Festival, 2022

In Queensland, Albanians socialise at picnics, barbecues and at community dinners where traditional drinks are served and communal singing is enjoyed. Queensland Albanians also celebrate Albanian Independence Day with Albanian folkloric music and dancing. Weddings are important events among the Albanian community. Often, they are big celebrations, lavish and full of symbolism. Marriages signify an important transition and position in the social status of a new couple, their parents and grandparents within the Albanian community.

=== Food ===
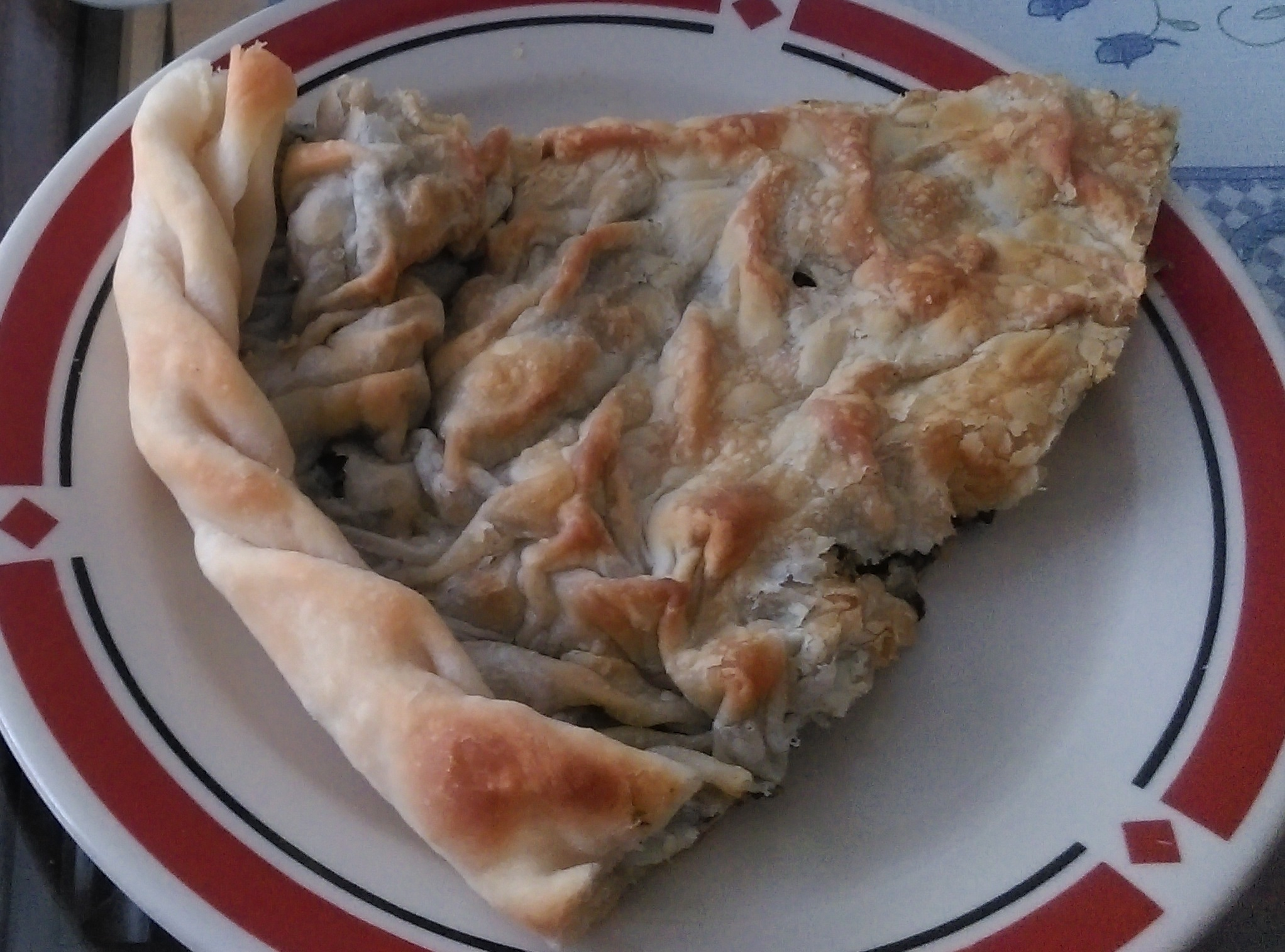
Lakror with spinach filling made by Prespa Albanians in Melbourne

Albanian cuisine is consumed in Australia. Abanian dishes include Lakror, a pastry with fillings such as cheese and spinach, tomato, onion and pepper, fried doughballs called Petulla; Revani, a semolina and sherbet cake; and Bakllava, a sweet, multilayered pastry filled with nuts. Some households attempt to pass on Albanian culinary traditions to younger generations.

=== Musical traditions ===
Various musical genres and dances exist among Albanians in Australia, reflecting the regions within the Balkans from where they migrated and stylistic differences that typify traditional music from northern and southern Balkan–Albanian areas. Polyphonic singing is associated with southern Albanian musical traditions; a singer begins a song and is followed by a second singer entering at a different melodic line while others maintain a drone (iso); this is mainly performed by elderly Prespa Albanians of both genders, though separately, at weddings.

Northern Albanian musical traditions of solo singing are performed by Albanians from Kosovo. The repertoire of songs, which often involves love songs and narrative ballads about historical or legendary events, is played on a stringed musical instrument like the çifteli and lahutë. Some local Albanian music bands are composed of a vocalist and other members who play clarinet, drums, electric guitar and piano accordion, though the latter is increasingly substituted with an electric keyboard. These bands perform at weddings or other gatherings and their music repertoire often reflects the influences from their places of origin in the Balkans, though some create new musical compositions.

Bands who reflect a Kosovo–Albanian origin often sing about patriotic and political themes, alongside traditional songs. Their music contains Turkish influences dating from the Ottoman era. Traditional dances are performed, some of the most popular of which the Shota for Kosovo Albanians, the Ulqin for Montenegro Albanians and the Devollice for Southern Albanians. Some dances that were previously performed by only one gender are increasingly being danced by both males and females, and many younger members of the Albanian community partake in traditional dancing.

== Notable people ==
=== Community leaders ===
- Memet Zuka – community leader and a founder of the Albanian Australian Islamic Society
- John P. Duro – community leader and founder of the Albanian Association of Queensland
- Jeanette Mustafa – community leader and a founder of the Australian Albanian Women's Association
- Erik Lloga – community leader, Australian–Albanian National Council chairman, interpreter

=== Science and academia ===
- Zihni Buzo – civil engineer
- Jerry X. Mitrovica, professor
- Avni Sali – professor, surgeon, clinician, researcher
- Përparim Xhaferi – academic

=== Business ===
- Remzi Mulla – tobacco farmer, Queensland Tobacco Board chairman
- Zimi Meka – mining engineer, founder of multinational resources company Ausenco

=== Politics and the judiciary ===
- Jim Memeti – Dandenong mayor
- Dinny Adem – Shepparton mayor
- Shane Sali – Shepparton mayor
- Rauf Soulio – District Court judge

=== Religion ===
- Rexhep Idrizi – imam
- Eljam Bardi – imam
- Benjamin Murat – imam
- Bekim Hasani – imam, scholar

=== Arts and entertainment ===
- Alex Buzo – playwright, author
- Arta Muçaj – actress
- Agim Hushi – tenor
- Gabriella Cilmi – musician

=== Sports ===
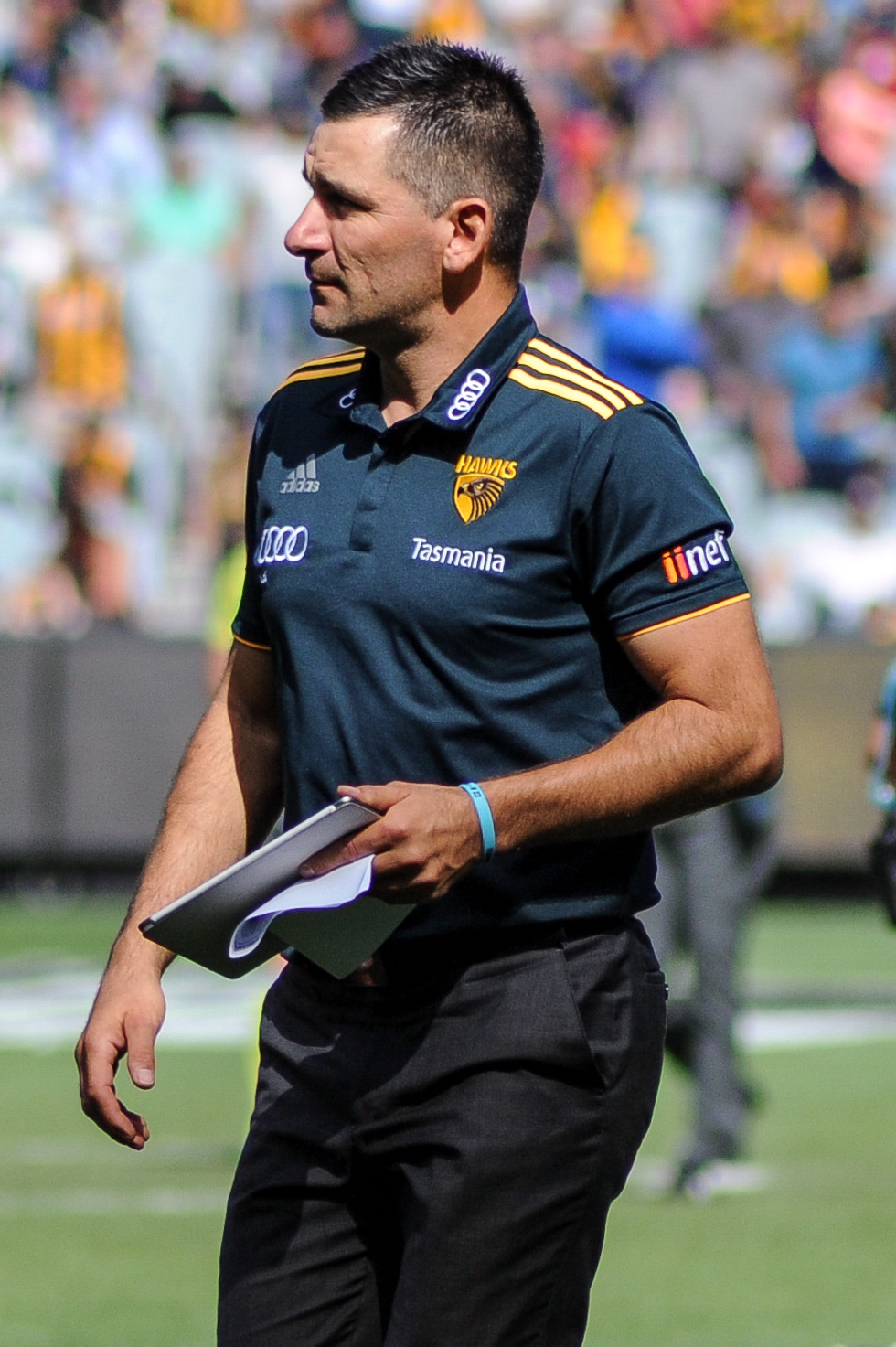
Adem Yze, AFL Richmond coach

- Ibrahim Balla – boxer, Olympic and Commonwealth Games athlete
- Qamil Balla – boxer, Commonwealth Games athlete
- Besart Berisha – soccer player
- Ellvana Curo – soccer player
- Mehmet Duraković – soccer player and coach
- Labinot Haliti – soccer player
- Medin Memeti – soccer player
- Susie Ramadan – boxer
- Taip Ramadani – handball player, handball coach
- Adem Yze – AFL footballer, AFL coach

== See also ==
- Albanian New Zealanders
- Albanian diaspora
- Albanians in North Macedonia
- Albanians
- Australia–Kosovo relations
- European Australians
- Europeans in Oceania
- Immigration to Australia

== External sources ==
=== Documentaries ===
- Where Are You Really From? Season 3 Episode 4 (News and Current Affairs). SBS. 14 July 2020. – documentary on Shepparton Albanian Australians
- Australia My Home; An Albanian Migration. 18 June 2020. Archived from the original on 21 December 2021. – documentary trailer on Albanian Australian migration
- I found a Hidden Muslim Town in The Aussie Outback. OnePath Network. 13 March 2024. – documentary on Mareeba Albanian Australians

=== Audio ===
- "Kujtimet e Emigrantëve" [Memories of Immigrants] (in Albanian). SBS. 7 September 2015. – Interview with the Memishi family and Jeannette Mustafa regarding migration and the Albanian Australian community
- "Modern Australia from the 1920s, a short Albanian History on the continent burned by the sun". SBS. 25 January 2019. – interview with Erik Lloga on the Albanian Australian community and its migration history
- "Early Migrant Stories: Albanian life in Mareeba". SBS. 17 August 2019. – interview with Remzi Mulla on life in Australia
