= Buzo =

Buzo is a surname

- Alex Buzo (1944–2006), Australian playwright and author
- Andrés Buzo, co-inventor of the Linde–Buzo–Gray algorithm
- Eva Buzo, Australian marathon swimmer
- Zihni Buzo (1912–2006), Albanian Australian civil engineer

== See also ==
- Sergio Buzó, Paraguayan artist
