= 1991 Australia Day Honours =

The 1991 Australia Day Honours are appointments to various orders and honours to recognise and reward good works by Australian citizens. The list was announced on 26 January 1991 by the Governor General of Australia, Bill Hayden.

The Australia Day Honours are the first of the two major annual honours lists, the first announced to coincide with Australia Day (26 January), with the other being the Queen's Birthday Honours, which are announced on the second Monday in June.

† indicates an award given posthumously.

== Order of Australia ==
=== Companion (AC) ===
==== General Division ====
Recipient	Citation	Notes
Sir Emil Herbert Peter Abeles	For services to Industry to Government and to the community	
The Honourable Lionel Frost Bowen	For service to the community and politics	
Michael Henry Codd	For service as Secretary to the Department of the Prime Minister and Cabinet	
Emeritus Professor Sir John Warcup Cornforth, CBE	For service to science, particularly in the field of organic chemistry	
Lieutenant General Sir Donald Beaumont Dunstan, KBE CB	For service to the Crown as Governor of South Australia	
Gerald Edward Fitzgerald	For service to the law and to the people of Queensland	
The Honourable Justice Michael Donald Kirby, CMG	For service to the law, the law reform, to learning and to the community	
Her Excellency the Honourable Dame Roma Flinders Mitchell DBE	For service to the law, to learning and to the community	
His Honour The Honourable James Henry Muirhead	For service to the community and to the law	
Sir Donald Henry Trescowthick, KBE	For service to the community, to the arts and to sport	

=== Officers (AO) ===
==== General Division ====
Recipient	Citation	Notes
Dr Gordon Thomson Archer	For service to medicine, particularly in the field of haemotology	
Kenneth Ivan Axton	For service to education	
Henry Bosch	For service to industry, commerce and to government	
Geraldine Rose Briggs	For service to the community, particularly the Aboriginal community	
William John Brown	For service to industrial relations	
Creighton Lee Burns	For service to the media and to international relations	
Stuart David Challender	For services to music	
Kenneth Henry Clarke	For service to medicine, particularly in the field of medical biophysics	
Professor Teresa Rita O'Rourke Cramond, OBE	For service to medicine, particularly in the field of anaesthesia and to the community	
William Allan Dick	For service to public health and to education	
Professor John Michael Dwyer	For service to public health, particularly through the treatment and prevention of infectious diseases	
Rhonda Louise Galbally	For service to the community	
Dr Allan Kerr Grant, RFD ED	For service to medicine, particularly in the field of gastroenterology and to medical education	
Dr Kathleen Athel Hockey	For service to medicine, particularly through the care of people with disabilities and to medical education about the genetic implications of certain disabilities	
Alan Robert Jackson	For service to business, to industry and to government	
Malcolm Alexander Kinnaird	For service to engineering and to the community	
Robert Broughton Lansdown, CBE	For service to communications	
Sir Francis (Thomas) Moore	For eminent services to the tourist industry and to the community	
Victor Berkeley Pullar	For service to civil engineering and to education	
His Excellency David Marshall Sadleir	For service to international relations	
Professor Rodney Phillip Shearman	For service to medicine, particularly in the fields of obstetrics, gynaecology and neo-natal welfare	
Kenneth Charles Stone	For service to industrial relations and to the community	
Michael John Terlet	For service to business and commerce and to exportation	
Dr Gordon Walgrave Trinca, OBE	For service to road safety and to medicine, particularly through the treatment of road accident casualties	
Derek Volker	For public service	
Dr Kevin William Walsh	For service to neuropsychology	
Professor Colin Peter Wendell-Smith	For service to public health	
Emeritus Professor Henry Malcolm Whyte	For service to clinical science and to the community	

==== Military Division ====
Branch	Recipient	Citation	Notes
Navy	Rear Admiral Kenneth Allan Doolan	For service to the Royal Australian Navy, particularly as the Assistant Chief and Deputy Chief of Naval Staff (Development)	
Navy	Rear Admiral Ian Donald George Macdougall	For service to the Royal Australian Navy, particularly as the Maritime Commander	
Army	Major General Arthur James Fittock, AM	For service to the Australian Army as Commander of the 1st Division	
Army	Major General John Cedric Grey	For service to the Australian Defence Force as Assistant Chief of Defence Force Logistics	
Army	Colonel John Murray Sanderson, AM	For service to the Australian Defence Force, particularly as Assistant Chief of Defence Force — Development	
Air Force	Air Commodore Peter Graeme Newton	For service to the Royal Australian Air Force as Assistant Chief of the Air Staff — Supply	

=== Member (AM) ===
==== General Division ====
Recipient	Citation	Notes
Marshall Berkeley Addison	For service to the Australian Red Cross Society and to youth	
Professor David Ernest Allan	For services to the legal education	
Laurie Alsop	For service to people with disabilities	
Darrel John Baldock	For service to the Tasmanian parliament and to Australian Rules Football	
Peter Leonard Barnett	For service to public communication, particularly through Radio Australia	
George Ernest Beard	For service to the community and veterans	
Allan Montgomery Beech	For service to medicine as a surgeon	
John Patrick Bennett	For service to the dairy industry	
Dr Evelyn Livingston Billings	For service to public health	
Dr John James Billings	For service to public health	
Maude Rose Bonney, MBE	For service to aviation	
Dirk Willem Bonouvrie	For service to the manufacturing industry	
Alan Dewane Brown	For service to international relations	
Maxwell Allan James Cameron	For service to the meat and livestock industry	
Sister Dorothy Margaret Campion	For service to education, particularly through the Sisters of Mercy in Australia	
Jean Kathleen Carman	For service to the arts, through the study of natural eucalypt dyes, and to the community	
Giovanni Angelo Cattalini	For service to the Italian community and local government	
Jeffery Wing Fai Cheung	For service to the Chinese community	
Robert Lewis Clifford	For service to public health as Chairman of the Institute of Medical and Veterinary Science Council and to the community	
Michael Kevin Collins	For service to education and to children with disabilities	
Rex Joseph Collins	For service to local government and to commerce	
Clinton Edward Condon	For service to primary industry	
Patrick John Conroy	For service to broadcasting, particularly through children's programmes	
Neil Raymond Crane	For service to communications	
Gilbert Currie	For service to industrial relations and to the community	
Sister Bernadine Daly	For service to the Aboriginal community	
Robert Davies	For service to the trade union movement	
William Rivers Dickinson	For service to education	
Dr Andrew Leslie Elek	For service to international relations	
Professor Catherine Joan Ellis	For service to music education and ethnomusicology, particularly Aboriginal music	
Francis Xavier Falzon	For service to the Maltese community	
Raymond Bernard Finnegan	For service to the Public Service	
Dr Alan Eric Fisher	For service to medicine as a general practitioner and to the community	
Edgar Noel Fitzpatrick	For service to agriculture	
John Dunbar Fowler	For service to construction	
Patrick John Galvin	For service to heritage, the arts and the Public Service	
Trevor John Garland	For service to nursing in Australia and overseas	
Daryl Stephen George	For service to industry	
Freda Glynn	For service to broadcasting and to the Aboriginal community	
Ardino Gosatti	For service to exportation and to the Italian community	
Dr Francis Walter Graham	For service to psychiatry and to psychotherapy	
Dr Lachlan Hardy-Wilson	For service to gynaecological oncology and to the arts	
Joan Harris (Mrs Parslow)	For service to the performing arts	
Steven Anthony Heathcote	For service to ballet	
The Honourable Dr Henry Alfred Jenkins	For service to the Australian parliament and to the community	
Professor Margaret Joy Kartomi	For service to ethnomusicology particularly south east Asian music	
Dr John Stirton Kinross	For service to dentistry	
Ken Laing	For service to music and to the community	
Mari Ann Lewis	For service to art and to the community	
Emeritus Professor Jack Frederick Loneragan	For service to education, particularly in the field of biology	
Constance Elizabeth Longworth	For service to the community, particularly to children with disabilities	
Alan Hamilton Loxton	For service to education and to the law	
William Richards Lumley	For service to the community, particularly in the field of ambulance services	
Beatrice Louise Maddock	For service to art and to art education	
George Winnington Martin	For service to construction and engineering	
Lady Beverley McKay	For service to Australian-British relations	
Alexander McDonald McLachlan	For service to engineering	
Percival Clarence Millar	For service to the Australian Parliament	
John David Moir	For service to the community, particularly in the areas of medical research and youth	
Neil Wighton Naismith	For service to pharmacy	
Dr Graeme Harrison Neilson	For service to medicine, particularly in the field of cardiology	
Dr James William Nixon	For service to the community, particularly in the field of child health education	
Maxwell Charles Olding	For service to music and to music education	
Eric Gordon Osboine	For service to people with disabilities	
Dr Hubert George Osborne	For service to veterinary science	
George Nicholas Pappas, MBE	For service to the Greek community	
Dr Robert Lyons Pearce, RFD	For service to community health	
Douglas Humphrey Perry	For service to forestry and to entomology	
Colonel John Francis Pilbeam, ED	For service to sport administration, particularly through the Australian Deaf Sports Federation, and to the community	
His Excellency Edward Robert Pocock	For service to international relations	
Father Julian Stanley Carrington Punch	For service to the community, particularly in the area of homeless and disturbed youth	
Graham Robert Ratcliff	For service to amateur radio organisations	
Phyllis Mary Reid	For service to nursing, particularly the provision of health services to the Aboriginal community	
Thomas Reynolds	For service to conservation and the environment, and to international measures against chemical warfare	
Dr Peter Netherton Richards	For service to applied science and technology	
Councillor John Lester Roach	For service to local government and to the community	
Robert John Robb	For service to primary industry and to the community	
John Percival Robertson	For service to the community	
Dorothy Dickson Ross, OBE	For service to women's affairs and to the community	
Kenneth Leslie Rowell	For service to the performing arts, particularly in the area of stage and costume design	
Philip James Ryan	For service to the community and to sport	
Irving David Saulwick	For service to the dairy industry	
Patricia Scott	For service to children's literature	
Michael John Sharpe	For service to accountancy	
Kenneth William Shugg	For service to architecture	
James Robert Smith	For service to community health and to education	
Allan Trevor Sorell	For service to community health and to education	
The Reverend Dr Donald Edward Stewart	For service to the community, particularly to aged people	
Owen William Sturgess	For service to primary industry, particularly the sugar industry	
Dr George Svéd	For service to education, particularly in the field of engineering	
Professor Francis Graham Swain	For service to education, particularly in the field of agriculture	
Dr Eric Gay Chee Tan	For service to international relations and to the community	
The Honourable Alexander Donald Taylor	For public service and service to the Western Australia Parliament	
Margaret Rose Timpson	For service to women's affairs and to the community	
Marie Celeste Van Hove	For service to music	
Allan Raymond Vosti	For service to industrial relations	
Christine Avis Walsh	For service to ballet	
William Fielding Fearn Wannan	For service to literature, particularly to Australian folklore	
Dr Arthur John Watson	For service to local government	
Dr William George Wells	For service to scouting	
Mawuyul Yanthalawuy	For service to education and to Aboriginal culture	

==== Military Division ====
Branch	Recipient	Citation	Notes
Navy	Captain Timothy Harvey Cox	For service to the Royal Australian Navy, particularly as the Chief Staff Officer (Operations) at Maritime Headquarters, Sydney	
Navy	Commodore Hector John Donohue	For service to the Australian Defence Force, particularly as the head of the Structural Review Implementation Team	
Navy	Lieutenant Andrew Charles Hamilton	For service to the Royal Australian Navy, particularly as Marine Engines Officer, HMAS Derwent	
Navy	Commodore Leonard Max Sulman	For service to the Royal Australian Navy, particularly as the Chief of Naval Support Command	
Army	Lieutenant Colonel Douglas John Ball	For service to the Army Reserve as Commanding Officer 8th/7th Battalion the Royal Victoria Regiment	
Army	Colonel Colin John Brewer	For service to the Australian Army as Commandant Army Apprentices School and Area Commander, Albury Wodonga Military Area	
Army	Colonel John Allan Crocker	For service to the Australian Army as Commander of the 2nd Australian Contingent United Nations Transition	
Army	Colonel Robert George Law	For service to the Australian Army in the field of Logistics	
Army	Lieutenant Colonel John Morgan McNamara	For service to the Australian Army as Commanding Officer of the 2nd Field Supply Battalion	
Army	Lieutenant Colonel Igors Pauza	For service to the Australian Army as Director of the Royal Australian Army Pay Corps	
Army	Lieutenant Colonel Michael Geoffrey Smith	For service to the Australian Army as the Commanding Officer 2/4th Battalion, the Royal Australian Regiment	
Air Force	Wing Commander Grant Stanley Buggy	For service to the Royal Australian Air Force as Administrator Staff Officer Headquarters RAAF Base Tindal	
Air Force	Wing Commander Roger Ashton Clark	For service to the Royal Australian Air Force as Commanding Officer No 2 Operational Conversion Unit	
Air Force	Wing Commander Alexander Ilife Johnson	For service to the Royal Australian Air Force as the Foundation Director of Personnel Information Services Air Force	
Air Force	Squadron Leader Mark Calvin King	For service to the Royal Australian Air Force as Tactical Flight Commander with No 36 Squadron	
Air Force	Flight Lieutenant John Tasman Oldfield	For service to the Royal Australian Air Force as Acoustic Warfare Standards and Training Officer No 10 Squadron	
Air Force	Air Commodore Douglas John Stuart Riding	For service to the Royal Australian Air Force as Officer Commanding RAAF East Sale	
Air Force	Group Captain Peter John Rushbridge	For service to the Royal Australian Air Force as Director of Project Management and Acquisition	

=== Medal (OAM) ===
==== General Division ====
Recipient	Citation	Notes
Colin William Allwood	For service to the community, particularly in the field of prosthetics	
Thelma Margaret Angel	For service to the community health, particularly through the Muscular Dystrophy Association of South Australia	
John Lewis Ashcroft	For service to music and to the community	
Donald Geoffrey Astley	For service to the community	
Joan Menzies Austin	For service to the community, particularly through the Save the Children Fund	
The Reverend Charles Marshall Bailey	For service to the community, particularly through the development of Chaplaincy and Pastoral care in Australia	
Edward John Barker	For service to education	
Elaine Valmai Barnett	For service to the social welfare of Defence personnel and youth	
Joyce Bayley	For service to the Public service	
Helen Shirley Bazley	For service to the visually impaired	
Chief Inspector Brian Anthony Blanch	For service to the community and public service	
Paul Francis Bolt	For service to the people with disabilities	
Kerry Anne Bowden	For service to the arts, particularly in the field of Aboriginal art	
Roma Jean Bowtell	For service to people with intellectual disabilities, particularly through the Helping Hand Association	
Douglas John Bradshaw	For service to brass band music	
John Patrick Brennan	For service to broadcasting	
James Howard Browne	For service to conservation, particularly in the field of botany	
Lady Alpha Loyal Batt Burley	For service to the community, particularly the Hobart Orchestral Subscriber's Association	
Zihni Jusuf Buzo	For service to the community	
Jacki Byrne	For service to social welfare	
Rosemary Major Campbell	For service to the arts, particularly the Australian Ballet Society	
Domenica Lucia Campi	For service to the community, particularly through the Endeavour Foundation and the Australian Red Cross Society	
Roma Joan Carlson	For service to the community through music	
Cecil Emil Carr	For service to local government and tertiary education	
Vernon George Carter	For service to the visually impaired, particularly through the Guide Dogs for the Blind Association of Queensland	
Roberta Carter-Brown	For service to nursing, particularly through education and administration	
Keith Portlock Chinchen	For service to the community, particularly the aged and to young people with disabilities	
Norman Leslie Chinn	For service to the community, particularly through the preservation of historic rail transport	
Robert Foo Hee Chong	For service to the Chinese community	
Edwin Henry Churchward	For service to the sugar cane industry	
Florence Beryl Cigler	For service to education, particularly the teaching of English as a second language	
Lionel Keith Clark	For service to agriculture, particularly through the eradication of noxious plants and the development of the Narromine Citrus Growers' Co-operative	
Stephanie St Clair Coleman	For service to music	
Ronald Victor Conway	For service to the community, particularly as a medical science communicator	
John Anthony Costa	For service to the Italian community and the aged	
Barbara Joy Cox	For service to veterans	
Philip Cox	For service to the Aboriginal community	
Howard Edward Henry Craven	For service to the broadcasting industry	
Ivana Cristina Csar	For service to the Spanish community	
Ashley James Dally	For service to scouting	
Tony Bernard Dalton	For service to the community, particularly homeless people	
Dr John Alfred Daly	For service to the sport of athletics	
Hampton Neil Dansie	For service to sport	
William David Dean	For service to sport	
Connie Victoria Dolphin	For service to the community	
Michael Leonard Donnelly	For service to local government	
Bernard Francis Doohan	For service to the sport of target rifle shooting	
Patrick Richard Dougheney	For service to scouting	
Keith Charles Edmonston	For service to the community, particularly in the field of traffic safety education for school children	
Allan Robert Edwards	For service to the sport of cricket	
Vincent Michael Egan	For service to the community and to veteran's welfare	
Mabel Amy Ehrlich	For service to the community and to the sport of lawn bowls	
Margaret Doreen Louisa Elliott	For service to the community	
Coral Ellen Farrelly	For service to veterans	
Joseph Augustine Fleming	For service to the community, particularly people with intellectual disabilities	
Michael Whitfield Forbes	For service to the tourism and hospitality industry	
Daryl Hugh Foster	For service to the sport of cricket	
Winifred Stella Frusher	For service to the community	
John Thaddius Gebhardt	For service to the Polish community and to multiculturalism	
Jennifer Gibbons	For service to the visually impaired	
Betty Christina Gill	For service to children with disabilities	
Audley Sinclair Gillespie-Jones	For service to the law and the community	
Victor John Gillman	For service to the community	
Colin McFarlane Glass	For service to community health	
Mary Lindsay Glue	For service to children with disabilities	
Maurine Gertrude Alice Goldston-Morris	For service to community history	
Stanley Noel Griffin	For service to hockey	
Leonard Henry Griffiths	For service to veterans and to the community	
Deaconess Gwyneth Hall	For service to the community, particularly the Healing Ministry of St Andrew's Cathedral	
Mary Jean Hamilton	For service to the community	
Frances Yvonne Hampshire	For service to the community and to local government	
Dr David John Harris	For service to the community and to preservation, particularly through the National Trust	
Leonard Albert Haycraft	For service to table tennis	
Reverend David Clifford Hayes	For service to veterans, particularly as chaplain, Repatriation General Hospital Concord	
The Reverend Father Michael Kerry Hayes	For service to the Aboriginal and Islander community	
Geoffrey Albert Heath	For service to local government and to the community	
The Reverend Roy Brian Henson	For service to youth particularly through Caloola farm employment training centre	
Rennie Elaine Herbert	For service to music	
Patricia Mary Hill	For service to the community particularly aged people	
Violet Winifred Hingerty	For service to the community, particularly aged people	
William Elton Hitchcock	For service to local government	
Madeleine Beryl Hoffman	For service to the community	
Nevin Lloyd Holland	For service to the egg industry	
Mary Elisabeth Hopkins	For service to the University of Queensland, particularly through the annual Alumni Association Book Fair	
Russell Ian Howey	For public service	
Irene Clara Hughes	For service to the community	
Leslie David Hume	For service to people with disabilities	
Ian Ross Huntington	For service to junior cricket administration	
Mary Ellen Linda Hutchin	For service to the community	
John Irving	For services to veterans and to Legacy	
Kenneth Jessup	For service to the community	
Robert Stanley Jones	For service to rowing	
Dr Reynaldo Dante Galura Juanta	For service to education, multiculturalism and to the Filipino community	
Sister Germanus Kent	For service to the community, particularly the Aboriginal community	
John Addison Kidston	For service to scouting	
Ian Bruce Carrick Kiernan	For service to conservation and the environment through the clean-up Australia campaign	
John Bryant King	For service to people with hearing disabilities in Australia and overseas	
Marjorie May Knox	For service to youth through the Launceston Student Workshop	
Brunon Jozef Kowalski	For service to the Polish community	
Anthony Felix Lannoy	For service to scouting	
Group Captain Justyn Ronald Lavers, AFC, AFM	For service to veterans, particularly through the Regular Defence Force Welfare Association	
Marion Florence Lawrence	For service to the Australian Red Cross Society	
Lloyd Vere James Lawson	For service to aged people	
Catherine Anne Le Page	For service to conservation and the environment	
Jean Limpus	For service to music	
Dalton Gokbo Liu	For service to the banana industry	
Joseph Alfred Loves	For service to ballroom dancing	
Harry Hing War Lowe	For service to the Chinese community	
John Henry Machin	For service to the community and to people with disabilities	
Jeannette Machlin	For service to the community, particularly the National Council of Jewish Women	
John Henry Main	For service to music	
Vida Merle Maney	For service to visually impaired children and to the community	
Francis Trueman Martin	For service to people with disabilities and to the community	
Donald Blackwood McCredie	For service to agriculture, water conservation and the irrigation industry	
Ellen Margery McCulloch	For service to ornithology	
John Francis McGirr	For service to the trade union movement	
Brian Francis McGrath	For service to the community, particularly through Lions International	
George McIntyre	For service to community health, particularly to mentally ill and intellectually handicapped people	
Donald William McLeod	For service to the Aboriginal community	
Elaine Alma Melzer	For service to nursing education in Australia and overseas	
Helen Ann Mitchell	For service to women's cricket	
Mark Campbell Moncrieff	For service to the poultry industry	
Audrey Adelaide Moore	For service to the community	
Doreen Munn	For service to the community, particularly through Meals on Wheels	
Bob Natoli	For service to the Italian community	
Bruce Arthur Neal	For service to pipe band music	
Anthony John Nesbit	For service to the community	
Zillah Lola Norrak	For service to the community	
Alan Joseph Norvill	For service to hospital administration and to the community	
Gordon George Noscov	For service to adult education and to the community	
Bohdan Nyskohus	For service to soccer	
Heather O'Connor	For service to women's affairs	
John Thomas O'Dwyer	For service to sport and to the community	
Mervyn David O'May	For service to golf	
George O'Neill	For service to badminton	
Dr David More O'Sullivan	For service to community history	
Angeline Oyang	For service to the community multiculturalism and to the Chinese community	
Donald Paginton	For service to local government	
John Frederick Parker	For service to local government	
Brenda Joy Pearl	For service to athletics administration	
Marion Monteith Pinkard	For service to aged people, particularly through Meals on Wheels	
Harold Pollard	For service to brass band music	
Russell Clive Porter	For service to education, particularly for the children of veterans	
Veronica Elizabeth Prochazka	For service to aged people, particularly those suffering from Alzheimer's disease	
Dianne Proctor	For service to the community	
Francis Rutherfoord Pullar	For service to the community	
Margaret Mary Quinn	For service to choral music	
Patricia Rawlings	For service to softball	
John Thompson Ridge	For service to the Anglican Men's Society	
Francis Henry Robertson MBE	For service to the community, particularly through the Toowoomba Art Gallery and the Toowoomba Chamber of Commerce	
Claude Ewald Roediger	For service to local government and to the community	
Dawn Roscholler	For service to community health	
Donald Norman Royce	For service to junior cricket	
Gordon Thomas Ryan	For service to community health, particularly as a radiographer	
Nora Elizabeth Ryan	For service to Legacy	
Justine Saunders	For service to the performing arts, particularly the National Aboriginal Theatre	
James Fulton Scholfield	For service to hospital administration and to the community	
Richard Charles Scott	For service to the community, particularly through emergency services	
Jack Victor Seekamp	For service to conservation and the environment	
Myrtle Eva Sharpe	For service to scouting	
Olive Ruth Shipp	For service to early childhood education and to the community	
Roger Francis Shipton	For service to the Australian Parliament and to politics	
Kevin Barry Skehan	For service to the community	
Alan Carnegie Smith	For service to the community, particularly through Rotary International	
The Reverend Nat Lewis Sonners	For service to visually impaired people	
George Hawley Stancombe	For service to the community	
Ross Milton Stanford DFC	For service to the community, particularly through the Ryder-Cheshire Foundation	
Marea Stenmark	For service to children with hearing and visual impairments	
Marie Patricia Stokes	For service to homeless youth	
Richard Thomas Stokes	For service to the Anglican Church and to the community	
Beryl Joan Strom	For service to community history and to the community	
Ronald Bock Kim Tan	For service to multiculturalism	
Marion Elizabeth Taylor	For service to conservation and to education	
Arthur Ronald Thorogood	For service to hospital administration and to the community	
Merle Tonkin	For service to women's affairs	
Pamela Tye	For service to hockey administration	
Joan Lorraine Wagstaff	For service to the community	
Emeritus Professor Charles Edward Wallington	For service to aviation meteorology, particularly in relation to air sports	
James Henry Watson	For service to veterans and to the community	
Darryl Charles Wells	For service to the community, particularly through emergency services	
John Horace George Wilkes	For service to the study of political science	
Colleen Frances Rosalie Wilson	For service to community health education	
Benjamin George Wooden	For service to veterans	
Major Donald Thomas Woodland	For service to the community, particularly through the Salvation Army	
Dr Elizabeth Jean Woods	For service to primary industry	
Norma Grace Woods	For service to veterans and to youth	
Albert Frederick Yarrington	For service to marine safety	
Ethel Marion Young	For public service, particularly as a librarian	
Rose May Young	For service to librarianship and to children's literature	

==== Military Division ====
Branch	Recipient	Citation	Notes
Navy	Chief Petty Officer Michael Barry Apperley	For service to the Royal Australian Navy, particularly as Officer-in-Charge Naval Stores, HMAS Parramatta	
Navy	Chief Petty Officer Stephen Edward Connor	For service to the Royal Australian Navy, particularly as Base Technical Officer, HMAS Kuttabul	
Navy	Chief Petty Officer Leslie Allan Crisp	For service to the Royal Australian Navy, particularly as Officer-in-Charge of Naval Tug Tammar during Kangaroo 1989	
Navy	Chief Petty Officer Gregory William Crooks	For service to the Royal Australian Navy, particularly as the Seaman Regulating Chief Petty Officer, HMAS Stuart	
Navy	Chief Petty Officer Alan Roy Rollinson	For service to the Royal Australian Navy, particularly as the Marine Engineering Officer, HMAS Townsville	
Army	Warrant Officer Class One Graeme Robert Andrews	For service to the Australian Army as an ammunition technician	
Army	Warrant Officer Class One Brian Thomas Boughton	For service to the Australian Army as the Regimental Sergeant Major of the 5th/7th Battalion (Mechanised) The Royal Australian Regiment	
Army	Warrant Officer Class One Matthew Charles Burke	For service to the Australian Army as Regimental Sergeant Major of the Army School of Transport	
Army	Warrant Officer Class One John Alexander Carter	For service to the Australian Army and Australian Defence, particularly as Regimental Sergeant Major of Northern Command	
Army	Warrant Officer Class One Garry Dennis Chillingsworth	For service to the Australian Army in the field of Air Defence Artillery	
Army	Warrant Officer Class One Ian Charles Crack	For service to the Australian Army as Regimental Quartermaster Sergeant of the 2nd Australian Contingent, United Nations Transition Assistance Group, Namibia	
Army	Warrant Officer Class One Norman Peter de Grussa	For service to the Australian Army, particularly the Pipes and Drums of The Royal Australian Regiment	
Army	Sergeant John Douglas George Dougall	For service to the Army Reserve as Unit Recruiting Sergeant 41st Battalion, The Royal NSW Regiment	
Army	Warrant Officer Class One Andrew Francis John Field	For service to the Australian Army as the Signals Staff Sergeant at the Royal Military College, Duntroon	
Army	Sergeant Robert William Hicks	For service to the Army Reserve and the community, particularly during the Newcastle earthquake relief operation	
Army	Warrant Officer Class One Norman Joseph Maher	For service to the Australian Army and community during the Nyngan Flood Disaster	
Army	Warrant Officer Class One Gary John Mapson	For service to the Australian Army as Supervisor Technical Telecommunications 6th Signal Regiment	
Army	Sergeant Heather May Smithson	For service to the Army Reserve in the field of catering	
Army	Warrant Officer Class One Frank Sykes	For service to the Army Reserve as an instructor with the Special Air Service Regiment Reserve Component	
Air Force	Warrant Officer John Stewart Howard	For service to the Royal Australian Air Force for engineering duties on the Black Hawk Helicopter Project	
Air Force	Sergeant Geoffrey Lovi	For service to the Royal Australian Air Force as an Engine Fitter with the No 38 Squadron	
Air Force	Warrant Officer David Leslie McManus	For service to the Royal Australian Air Force as Duty Air Movements Officer RAAF Base Fairbairn	
Air Force	Sergeant Mark Edward Monkley	For service to the Royal Australian Air Force as an Air Frame Fitter with the No 76 Squadron	
Air Force	Sergeant Russell Thomas Screaigh	For service to the Royal Australian Air Force as Senior Non-Commissioned Officer-in-Charge of the Aircraft Preparation and Recovery Crew with the No 2 Aircraft Depot	
Air Force	Flight Sergeant Gregory Ronald Shaw	For service to the Royal Australian Air Force as an Airman Manner in the Directorate of Personnel Airmen	
Air Force	Flight Sergeant Douglas Frederick John Vickers	For service to the Royal Australian Air Force as a Metal Machinist in developing the Computer Numerical Control course	
