= Uramba Bahía Málaga National Natural Park =

National park in Colombia

Parque Natural Nacional Uramba Bahía Málaga
- IUCN category II (national park)
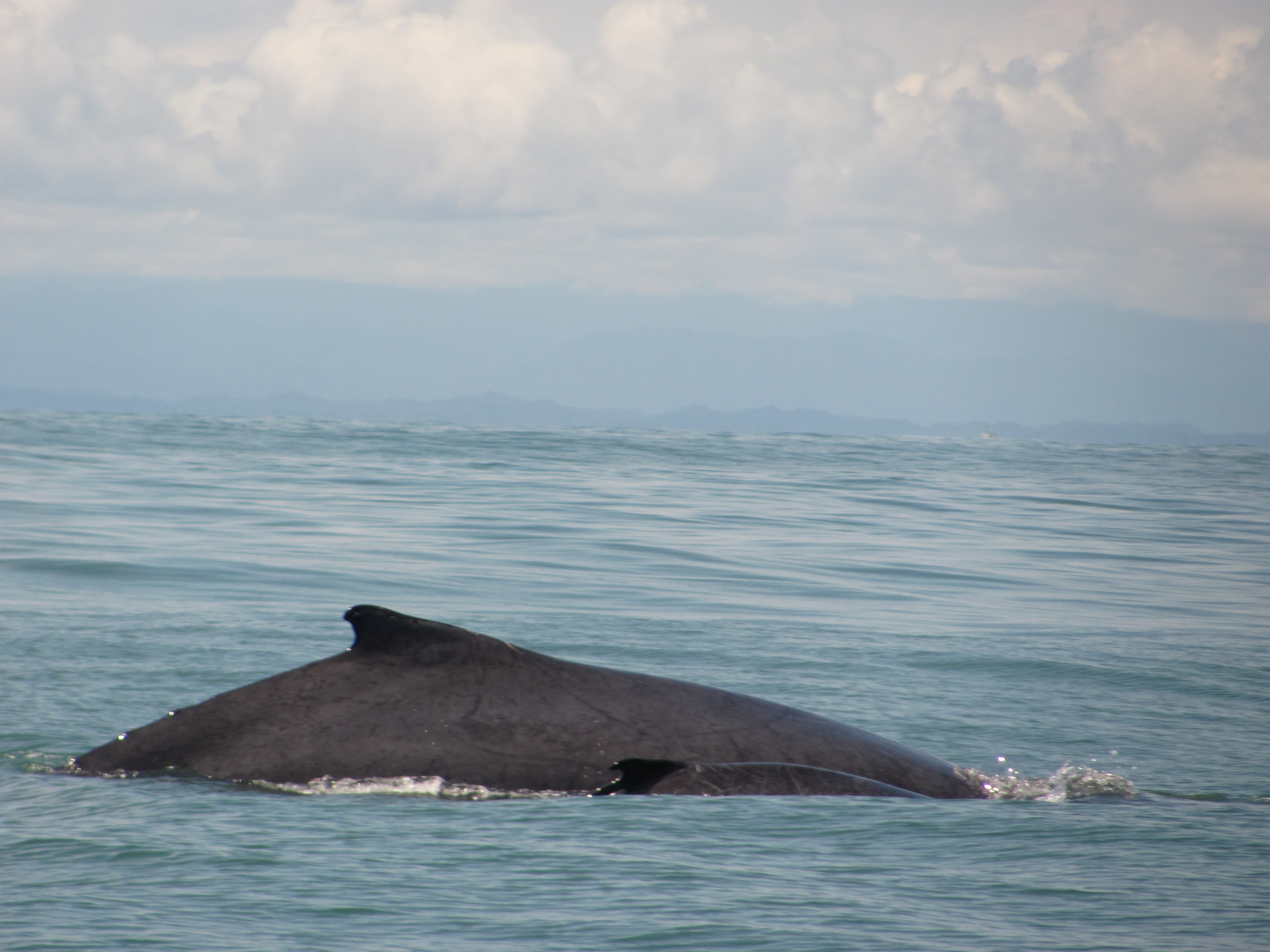

- Location within Colombia
- Location: Valle del Cauca Department, Colombia
- Nearest city: Buenaventura
- Coordinates: 04°01′N 77°26′W
- Area: 471 km^{2} (182 sq mi)
- Established: 2010
- Governing body: SINAP

Uramba Bahía Málaga National Natural Park, is one of the newest Colombian national parks and a popular ecotourism destination. It is located in and around Málaga Bay on the Colombian Pacific coast in the district of Buenaventura, Valle del Cauca, Colombia. It is an area of high biodiversity and a favorite spot for reproducing humpback whales, making this area a popular whale watching destination. Most of natural area is pristine with the exception of the areas around a few small towns like Juanchaco, Ladrilleros, and La Barra, as well as a Colombian naval base. The national park was created in 2010 and is Colombia's 56th national natural park.

== Geography ==
The protected area is composed of 471 km^{2} (182 sq mi) of coastal land and marine areas.

== Biodiversity ==
The ecosystems found within the protected area include wet tropical forest, transitional forest, flooded forest, mangroves, estuaries, beaches, and pelagic zones.

The main animal of interest in this area is the humpback whale (Megaptera novaeangliae). The whales use the waters of this protected area to raise calves between June and October. It is said that this area has the largest concentration of breeding humpbacks along the Colombian Pacific coast.
