= Rooted (film) =

- Based on: Play by Alex Buzo
- Written by: Alex Buzo
- Directed by: Ron Way
- Starring: James Laurie; Genevieve Mooy; Peter Mochrie; Terry Serio; Kathleen Allen
- Country of origin: Australia
- Original language: English

Production
- Producer: Alan Burke
- Running time: 81 minutes
- Production company: Australian Broadcasting Corporation (ABC)

Original release
- Network: Australian Broadcasting Corporation
- Release: 1985

Rooted is a made-for-TV Australian film based on the play by Alex Buzo. It was produced for the Australian Broadcasting Corporation (ABC) and released in 1985.

== Cast ==
- James Laurie as Bentley
- Genevieve Mooy as Sandy
- Terry Serio as Gary
- Peter Mochrie as Richard
- Kathleen Allen as Diane
- Shane Connor
- Ian Spence

== Production ==
Buzo was approached to make the film by Alan Burke. "He approached me to do this for what I felt were all the right reasons," said Buzo. "I thought he would do it with style and flair, rather than being pedestrian and naturalistic. But I didn't breathe my sigh of relief with Rooted until I saw the final version."

The film was set in Manly in the mid-sixties. According to Buzo, "I've been told Rooted hasn't dated, but with a telemovie it has got to have a more definite time and place."

Buzo said making a telemovie was tough. "It is so silent, it is like swimming underwater. When I saw the rough cut I was a bit shocked because the film medium seems unsubstantial compared to the stage... I think the stage is more malleable; if something doesn't work you can change it immediately. If something doesn't work on television you just can't go back and change it."

Buzo was happy with the end product. "If all television could turn out like this I would be very happy because if it bad been done badly it would have reflected on the play. If it is good, it's like having something embalmed, like having 'St Rooted'."

The film remained stylised. "I hate the naturalism of all these mini-series," said Buzo. "It is so boring. I prefer things to be like Rooted, more quirky, like a black comedy."

== Reception ==
The Age's Jason Romney calls it "a peculiar mix of domestic drama, black comedy and social satire" and says "Although too long, Rooted is nonetheless a merciless examination of the social centrifuge that can send a man to the "outer"." The Age columnist Barbara Hook wrote "Unfortunately, Buzo gets rather caried away with his own cleverness. 'Rooted' is far too long and palls towards its enigmatic ending. But in between it is hugely entertaining and so sharp it could cut itself."
