= Cramond (disambiguation) =

Cramond is a village and suburb of Edinburgh, Scotland.

Cramond may also refer to:

== Places ==
- Cramond Island, an island in the Firth of Forth, near Edinburgh
- Cramond (Strafford, Pennsylvania), a historic home in Chester County, Pennsylvania, U.S.

== People ==
- Lord Cramond, a 17th- and 18th-century title in the nobility of Scotland
- Albert Cramond (1881–1954), New Zealand cricketer
- Gordon Cramond (1949–1989), Scottish footballer
- Tess Cramond (1926–2015), Australian doctor
- Zoe Cramond (born 1984), New Zealand actress
