= Eva Buzo =

Australian marathon swimmer

- Buzo in Buenaventura, Colombia, in 2025

Personal information
- Nationality: Australian
- Born: 1986 (age 39–40)
- Relatives: Alex Buzo (uncle), Zihni Buzo (grandfather)

Sport
- Sport: Swimming

Eva Buzo (born 1986) is an Australian marathon swimmer and human rights barrister. She is the first woman to complete the Strait of Otranto swim, holds the record for earliest English Channel crossing in the season by a woman, and is the first person to complete a swim between Juanchaco and Buenaventura in Colombia. Her human rights work focuses on international criminal law and conflict situations. She was the lawyer of slain Rohingya activist Mohib Ullah. She is the granddaughter of Australian Albanian civil engineer Zihni Buzo (1912-2006) and niece of Australian writer Alex Buzo (1944-2006).

== Marathon swimming ==
After swimming competitively as a child, Buzo took up marathon swimming in 2020 during the COVID-19 pandemic in Australia. Her first recorded marathon swim was a two-day, 77-km Derwent River swim in Tasmania, Australia on 24 and 25 March 2022.

=== Notable swims ===
Buzo has completed three swims which are recognised as "firsts":

==== Strait of Otranto ====
After her first attempt in June 2023 was unsuccessful, Buzo swam 92 kilometres (ratified by the Marathon Swimmers Federation as 77.2km point-to-point) from Lecce, Italy to Vlorë, Albania on 17-19 August 2024 in 34 hours and 52 minutes. She is recognised as the first woman to complete the crossing. She chose the swim to pay tribute to the 50 Albanians who died in March 1997 trying to cross from Albania to Italy and to honour her Albanian Australian grandfather, Zihni Buzo (1912-2006).

==== English Channel ====
Buzo departed Shakespeare Beach, Dover at 23:15 on 5 June 2024, completing the crossing in 10 hours and 49 minutes. The water temperature during the swim was 13 degrees Celsius. She currently holds the record for the earliest Channel crossing in the season by a woman.

==== Juanchaco to Buenaventura, Colombia ====
Buzo completed the 40km swim from Juanchaco to Buenaventura on 21 June 2025 in more than 10 hours. Her stated goal was to "pay tribute and give visibility to the resistance of the people of Buenaventura". She is considered the first person to complete the swim.

Other notable swims include:

==== Protest swim around Sazan Island ====
Buzo decided to undertake the swim after learning that her younger cousin was at the Flamingo Revolution protests. On 6 June 2026, she swam 15km around Sazan Island in Vlorë, Albania to protest the development of the island by the Trump family.

=== Against the Tide campaign ===
In 2026, Buzo undertook a series of swims under the name Against the Tide, pairing open-water endurance swims with advocacy by local communities. She discussed the campaign on BBC Radio 4's Woman's Hour on 10 November 2026.

==== Cabo Rojo, Puerto Rico ====
On 4 October 2026, Buzo swam 40km from Rincón to Boquerón Bay in Cabo Rojo, Puerto Rico, the first swim of the campaign. The swim was in solidarity with opposition to Esencia, a proposed luxury tourism development in an ecologically sensitive part of Cabo Rojo.

==== Half Moon Bay to Montego Bay, Jamaica ====
On 25 October 2026, Buzo swam 34km along the north coast of Jamaica from Half Moon Bay in Trelawny to One Man Beach in Montego Bay, entering the water at 06:39 and finishing at 17:28. The swim supported the Jamaica Beach Birthright Environmental Movement (JaBBEM) and its campaign to repeal the Beach Control Act 1956, a colonial-era law that vests the foreshore in the state. Her collaboration with JaBBEM began in August 2026, following her swim around Sazan Island. Buzo has described the lack of public access to Jamaica's beaches as a human rights issue.

== Human rights work ==
Buzo is a human rights barrister and executive director of human rights organisation Humanus. Her decision to join the human rights field was inspired by her late grandfather Zihni Buzo's passion for serving others and by watching the breakup of Yugoslavia and the situation with Kosovo. Her work has focused on international criminal law and conflict situations, specifically in Myanmar with the Rohingya people. She represented Rohingya activist Mohib Ullah at the time of his murder. Through Humanus she has also represented civilian victims of United States military operations in Somalia.
