= Ann Mitchell (disambiguation) =

Ann Mitchell (born 1939) is a British actress.

Ann or Anne Mitchell may also refer to:

- Ann Mitchell (cricketer) (born 1945), Australian cricketer
- Anne Mitchell (born 1950), American educator
- Ann Katharine Mitchell (1922–2020), British cryptanalyst and author
- Anne Mitchell-Gift, Tobago politician

== See also ==
- Kerri-Ann Mitchell (born 1983), Canadian sprinter
