= Arthur! and the Square Knights of the Round Table =

- Arthur! and the Square Knights of the Round Table (DVD cover)
- Also known as: Arthur (UK)
- Genre: Comedy; Adventure
- Written by: Alexander Buzo; Rod Hull; John Palmer
- Directed by: Zoran Janjic
- Voices of: John Meillon; Lola Brooks
- Composer: Clare Bail
- Country of origin: Australia
- Original language: English
- No. of episodes: 12 (36 segments)

Production
- Producer: Walter J. Hucker
- Production location: Sydney
- Running time: 24 minutes
- Production company: Air Programs International

Original release
- Network: ABC
- Release: 1966 – 1968

Arthur! And the Square Knights of the Round Table is a 1966–1968 Australian animated series based on the legend of King Arthur of Camelot.

The series was produced by Air Programs International and written by Melbourne playwright Alex Buzo and British-born entertainer Rod Hull, with Lyle Martin, Michael Robinson, and John Palmer. The characters included King Arthur, Guinevere, Lancelot, Merlin, the Jester, the Black Knight, and Morgana le Fay. The actors who voiced the character parts in the series included: John Meillon (as "Arthur"), Lola Brooks (as "Guinevere" and "Morgana le Fay"), John Ewart, Kevin Golsby, and Matthew O'Sullivan.

By 1969, the series had been sold for broadcast in the United Kingdom and North America. In Australia, where it was made and produced, it was sold also to the Australian Broadcasting Commission, for broadcast on the ABC-TV network. Typically it was broadcast on Saturday mornings and initially also, on Monday evenings. As the Australian television industry did not go to colour broadcast until March 1975, viewers saw the series in black and white for the first six years of its Australian transmission.

ABC-TV continued repeated the series for most of the 1970s; its last appearance as children's programming was March 1985.

The series was broadcast in Italy in the early 1970s. French television purchased it for broadcast in 1980-81, supplying a French soundtrack, without the original music. It was broadcast on the French television channel, TF1. In 1993, the series was also broadcast on German cable television.

== Original episodes ==
| No. | Title |
|---|---|
| 1 | "Octopus" |
| 1 | "Would You Believe, A Beanstalk?" |
| 1 | "Which Wizard Versus What Witch" |
| 2 | "There's An Elephant at the Drawbridge" |
| 2 | "A Nice Knight for a Wedding" |
| 2 | "Paris Picnic" |
| 3 | "It's the Only Kingdom I've Got" |
| 3 | "Old Moody" |
| 3 | "I'll See If I'm There" |
| 4 | "The Inn" |
| 4 | "Seventeen Going on Seventy" |
| 4 | "Will the Real Arthur Please Stand Up" |
| 5 | "The Genie Who Came to Dinner" |
| 5 | "No Laugh Olaf" |
| 5 | "Some Maidens Just Aren't Fair" |
| 6 | "New Armour for the King" |
| 6 | "Smile, Smile, Smile" |
| 6 | "That's What I Call Music" |
| 7 | "It's the Gift That Counts" |
| 7 | "King's Champion" |
| 7 | "Undercover Knight" |
| 8 | "How Do You Like Them Apples" |
| 8 | "Pink is In" |
| 8 | "Get Your Wish Here" |
| 9 | "Little Bundle" |
| 9 | "The Crown Jewels" |
| 9 | "Mail-Order Bride" |
| 10 | "The Unicorn of Camelot" |
| 10 | "Belle of the Ball" |
| 10 | "While Camelot Sleeps" |
| 11 | "Play Gypsy Play" |
| 11 | "Be Kind to Dragons" |
| 11 | "The Search For Guinevere" |
| 12 | "Even Knights Have To Eat" |
| 12 | "The Wrecker" |
| 12 | "Assault On Castle Morgana" |

== Home releases ==
Revelation Films released a DVD titled "Arthur and the Square Knights of the Round Table" in 2003. This Region "0" DVD has a 200-minute running time and contains the first 8 episodes, thus containing 24 cartoons of the 36.

Prior to this, Castle Vision had released two VHS video cassettes in 1992. Each of these tapes has 2 episodes, which accordingly have three cartoon stories per episode, making it a total of six stories per 48-minute tape. The Castle Vision tapes were released in the UK, under licence from the rights holders in Australia. Both tapes are in the European PAL format.
