= Margaret J. Kartomi =

Australian ethnomusicologist

Margaret Joy Kartomi AM FAHA (née Hutchesson) is an Australian ethnomusicologist who is known especially for her contributions to the study of Asian music. She is an emeritus professor of Monash University in Melbourne. She specialises in the music of Indonesia and Southeast Asia.

== Biography ==
Born in Adelaide, Margaret Kartomi studied at the University of Adelaide, and then got her doctorate in musicology in Berlin, from the Humboldt University. She started at Monash University in 1969, where she had a research fellowship (1969), then a lectureship (1979), and a readership (1976); she became a professor in 1989. At Monash, she founded the Sumatra Music Archive, the Asian Music Archive, and the Australian Archive of Jewish Music.

She is on the editorial board of the Ethnomusicology Monograph Series of the University of Chicago Press, and of the Music, Dance and Theatre Iconography series of the Hollizer Wissenschaftsverlag. She has published many books, four monographs, and a number of important journal articles.

== Awards and recognition ==
In 1982 Kartomi was elected Fellow of the Australian Academy of the Humanities.

She was appointed a Member of the Order of Australia in the 1991 Australia Day Honours for " service to ethnomusicology, particularly south east Asian music ".

=== Bernard Heinze Memorial Award ===
The Sir Bernard Heinze Memorial Award is given to a person who has made an outstanding contribution to music in Australia.

Year	Nominee / work	Award	Result	Ref.
2015	Margaret J. Kartomi	Sir Bernard Heinze Memorial Award	awarded	

== Bibliography ==
- Kartomi, Margaret J; Monash University (1974), Matjapat songs in central and west Java, Australian National University Press in association with Monash University and the Faculty of Asian Studies, Australian National University, ISBN 978-0-7081-0355-5
- Kartomi, Margaret J; Monash University (1981), Five essays on the Indonesian arts : music, theatre, textiles, painting and literature, Monash University, ISBN 978-0-86746-074-2
- Kartomi, Margaret J; Indonesian Arts Society (1985), Musical instruments of Indonesia, Indonesian Arts Society, ISBN 978-0-9589225-0-0
- Kartomi, Margaret J (1990), On concepts and classifications of musical instruments, University of Chicago Press, ISBN 978-0-226-42549-8
- Kartomi, Margaret J (2002), The gamelan Digul and the prison camp musician who built it : an Australian link with the Indonesian revolution (Ed. 1 ed.), University of Rochester Press, ISBN 978-1-58046-088-0
- Kartomi, Margaret J. (Margaret Joy); Monash University. Monash Asia Institute (2005), The year of voting frequently : politics and artists in Indonesia's 2004 elections, Monash Asia Institute, Monash University Press, ISBN 978-1-876924-38-6
- Kartomi, Margaret J (2012), Musical journeys in Sumatra, University of Illinois Press, ISBN 978-0-252-03671-2
