= Bea Maddock =

Australian artist (1934–2016)

- Bea Maddock in 1976
- Born: Beatrice Louise Maddock; 13 September 1934; Hobart, Tasmania, Australia
- Died: 9 April 2016 (aged 81); Launceston, Tasmania, Australia
- Known for: Painting, Printmaking

Beatrice Louise "Bea" Maddock AM (13 September 1934 – 9 April 2016) was an Australian artist.

== Biography ==
Born in Hobart, Tasmania, Bea Maddock studied art education at the University of Tasmania, Hobart and taught secondary school in her home city before travelling abroad to study at the Slade School of Art, London. Her teachers included William Coldstream, Ceri Richards and Anthony Gross. Maddock visited Paris, Italy, the Netherlands and Germany, where she closely studied the work of the German Expressionists, who were a formative influence. She also stopped in Bombay, India during the return trip by ship to Australia.

Maddock returned to Australia to teach in Launceston, Tasmania, before settling in the state of Victoria. She taught printmaking at the Victorian College of the Arts for several years from 1970 and returned to Tasmania as Head of the School of Art, Launceston in 1983–84. Maddock was a Creative Arts Fellow at the Australian National University, Canberra in 1976.

Maddock lived and worked at Mount Macedon, Victoria until the Ash Wednesday fires of 1983 forced her to flee. Her house, studio and a large archive of many decades' work were destroyed. She later returned to her native state of Tasmania. In 1987 Maddock participated in the 'Artists in Antarctica' program with Jan Senbergs and John Caldwell. While on that voyage, she badly fractured her leg on Heard Island, which compromised her mobility for several years afterwards.

She was appointed Member of the Order of Australia in the 1991 Australia Day Honours for "service to art and to art education".

== Work ==
Maddock is best known as a printmaker, in which area she profoundly impacted contemporary practice in Australia, combining printing with encaustic painting and installation art to explore the natural environment, Aboriginal Australia, and Australian history.

She won many prizes and is represented in the National Gallery of Australia, all Australia State galleries, the Museum of Modern Art in New York, and the USA's National Gallery in Washington.

Maddock's most recent major work, 'Terra Spiritus... With a Darker Shade of Pale', is a 51 part inscribed etching of the entire coastline of Tasmania, each feature labelled with both the English and the Aboriginal Tasmanian topographic names. The pigments used to make the drawing are locally occurring Tasmanian ochres.

Staff of the Queen Victoria Museum and Art Gallery in Launceston, Tasmania are currently preparing a catalogue raisonné. It will contain entries on 978 works produced by the artist between 1952 and 1983.

== Selected individual exhibitions ==
- Ingles Building, Launceston, Tasmania: 1964
- Crossley Gallery, Melbourne: 1967, 1968, 1971
- Queen Victoria Museum and Art Gallery, Launceston, Tasmania: 1970
- Gallery A, Sydney: 1974, 1978
- National Gallery of Victoria, Melbourne: 1975 (Three Printmakers), 1980
- National Art Gallery of New Zealand, Wellington: 1982-3 (touring retrospective)
- Stuart Gerstman Galleries, Melbourne: 1988
- Tasmania Museum and Art Gallery, Hobart: 1988 (Antarctic Journey, with John Caldwell and Jan Senbers), 1990 (Australian Printmakers, with Ray Arnold and Rod Ewins)
- Australian National Gallery, Canberra: 1992-3 (Being and Nothingness, touring retrospective)

== In collections ==
Her work is represented in the collections of the National Gallery of Victoria (92 works), the National Gallery of Australia, the Art Gallery of South Australia, the Museum of Modern Art, the National Gallery of Canada (2 works), Te Papa (10 works) and the Lawrence Wilson Art Gallery at UWA.

== See also ==
- Art of Australia
