= The Old Curiosity Shop (1984 film) =

1984 Australian animated film

- DVD cover
- Directed by: Warwick Gilbert
- Written by: Alex Buzo
- Based on: novel by Charles Dickens
- Produced by: Eddie Graham
- Production company: Burbank Films
- Release date: 17 February 1984
- Running time: 75 mins
- Country: Australia
- Language: English

The Old Curiosity Shop is a 1984 Australian animated film based on the 1841 novel by Charles Dickens about a young girl (Nell) who lives with her grandfather in a shop, and what happens after they are evicted from the shop by Quilp, a moneylender. It was made by Burbank Films who produced a number of animated films based on classic novels. Their slate cost an estimated $11 million. The Dickens films sold to 20th Century Fox in the US and to the Seven Network in Australia.

== Cast ==
- John Benton
- Jason Blackwell
- Wallas Eaton
- Penne Hackforth-Jones
- Brian Harrison
- Doreen Harrop
- Ross Higgins
- Sophie Horton
- Jennifer Mellet
