= Kevin Walsh (neuropsychologist) =

Australian neuropsychology pioneer

Kevin William Walsh
- Born: 13 July 1925; Australia
- Died: 4 December 2017 (aged 92); Victoria, Australia
- Citizenship: Australian
- Scientific career
- Fields: Clinical neuropsychology
- Workplaces: University of Melbourne

Kevin William Walsh AO (13 July 1925 – 4 December 2017) was an Australian pioneer of the profession of clinical neuropsychology.

== Career ==
Walsh served with in the Royal Australian Air Force during World War II, then commenced medical studies in 1946. In the first year of his medical training, he became interested in psychology and enrolled in the University of Melbourne’s newly established Department of Psychology.

After completing his medical studies, Walsh became interested in abnormal behaviour, and during his tenure as a Neuropsychiatric Medical Officer at the Mont Park Mental Hospital, he studied the complex behavioural alterations induced by prefrontal leucotomy, for which the degree of Master of Science was awarded in 1960. Working as a medical officer, he saw a clinical discipline that would unite psychological depth with neurology.

In 1961, Walsh joined the teaching staff of the University of Melbourne's Department of Psychology, initially in an honorary position. Walsh taught a syndrome-oriented approach to neuropsychology, informed by an understanding of neuroanatomy, neurological and neuropsychological syndromes and psychometrics. He taught his students to listen to and observe the patient, talk to the family and to think logically, describing neuropsychology as 'a body-contact sport.' Walsh collaborated with his friend Peter Bladin, director of neurology at the Austin Hospital, Melbourne, to establish a postgraduate training program in Clinical Neuropsychology at the university and a Clinical Neuropsychology Unit at the hospital. The first student intake was in 1977. Walsh retired from teaching in 1991.

One of his most influential works was Neuropsychology: A Clinical Approach, first published in 1978, intending it to be an introduction to the field. The book was published with David Darby in 1999, then published as Walsh's Neuropsychology in 2005, and was translated into a number of languages.

== Conference and organisation ==
In 1977, Walsh and Gordon Stanley founded the Australian Society for the Study of Brain Impairment (ASSBI), with Walsh as the inaugural president. The organisation has focused on giving aspiring neuropsychologists an environment to meet their peers and more experienced clinicians and researchers.

Walsh, Bladin and Stanley hosted a conference called the Brain Impairment Workshop at the Austin Hospital in Melbourne in 1976, where the ASSBI organisational name and logo were chosen and it became the annual conference of the organisation. At the 1978 conference, Walsh gave the opening address entitled ‘The Nature of Modern Neuropsychology’ in which he spoke about the studies of neurologists Hans-Lukas Teuber, Brenda Milner and Alexander Luria, who looked at missile wounds from World War II and applied the concept of the neuropsychological syndrome. This was in contrast to the single construct of organic brain damage being advocated by clinical psychologists in the United States of the time. Annual conference proceedings were published until 2000 when the society launched Brain Impairment, a peer-reviewed scientific journal.

== Awards ==
Walsh was honoured with the Order of Australia in the 1991 Australia Day Honours for service to neuropsychology.

In 1995, the International Neuropsychological Society (INS) awarded Walsh with an Honorary Membership in recognition of his contribution to Neuropsychology and in 2013 was awarded a Distinguished career Award.

== Books ==
- Walsh, Kevin W (1978). Neuropsychology: A Clinical Approach. Churchill Livingstone.
- Molloy, Maureen; Walsh, Kevin (1979). Early detection of falloff in cognitive function in chronic alcoholics. University of Melbourne.
- Walsh, Kevin W (1985). Understanding Brain Damage: A Primer of Neuropsychological Evaluation. Churchill Livingstone.
- Walsh, Kevin W; Darby, David (1999). Neuropsychology: A Clinical Approach. Churchill Livingstone.
- Darby, David; Walsh, Kevin W (2005). Walsh's Neuropsychology: A Clinical Approach. Elsevier Churchill Livingstone.
