= Coralie Lansdowne Says No =

- Original language: English
- Written by: Alex Buzo
- Genre: comedy

Premiere
- Date: 1974

Coralie Lansdowne Says No is a play by Alex Buzo about a woman's struggle for independence.

== Plot ==
Coralie is an independent woman who refuses to settle down to one man. When she stays at an ex lover's beach house, a series of visitors make her re-think her place in the world.

== Production history ==
The play was first produced by the Nimrod Theatre in 1974 as part of the Adelaide Festival of the Arts.

== 1980 TV adaptation ==
"Coralie Lansdowne Says No"
- Australian Theatre Festival episode
- Episode no.: Season 1 Episode 1
- Written by: Alex Buzo
- Original air date: 20 July 1980
- Running time: 93 mins

The play was filmed by the ABC in 1980 as the first part of the Australian Theatre Festival.

Producer Alan Burke says Buzo changed his own play significantly but was very happy with the result saying it better represented what he wanted to write.

=== Cast ===
- Wendy Hughes as Coralie Landsdowne
- David Waters as Stuart
- Brian Blain as Peter
- Robert Coleby as Paul
- Elaine Mangan as Anne
- Mary-Lou Stewart as Jill
- Basil Clarke as Dr. Salmon

=== Reception ===
The Sydney Morning Herald TV critic called it "a TV flop". Brian Courtis of The Age praises the performance of Hughes writing "It is a marvellous performance and her apparent enjoyment of Buzo's crackling dialogue highlights a crisply-directed television adaptation of the play."
