= Ronald Conway =

Australian psychologist and author

Ronald Victor Conway OAM (4 May 1927 – 16 March 2009) was an Australian psychologist and author, best known for his sociological works of the 1970s and 1980s, including The Great Australian Stupor which sold around 70,000 copies (a considerable number by Australian standards), and The Land of the Long Weekend (1978). Among other books by him were The End of Stupor? (1984), Being Male (1985), The Rage for Utopia (1994) and a memoir, Conway's Way (1988).

== Career ==
Conway was born in the Melbourne suburb of Oakleigh, the second son of Leslie Conway and his wife Elizabeth, and grew up as an only child (his brother Keith having died before Ronald was born). In later years, he said that his love of books came from his father and his mother taught him to stand up to the world (his Who's Who entry does not mention her). He also suggested that single-child families should be banned by governments.

His early education was constrained by the Great Depression and the family's limited finances, as well as his parents' alleged lack of interest in his abilities. He went to both state and Catholic schools, including Hawksburn state school (where he won a prize for his essay about The Ugly Duckling by Hans Christian Andersen) and later, when the fees for Christian Brothers College were too much his family, he attended St Joseph's Technical College in the Melbourne suburb of Abbotsford, which he left aged 15 for a job at the Hill of Content bookshop in Bourke Street, in Melbourne's central business district.

During the final years of the Second World War, Conway progressed to electrical fitting in the Royal Australian Air Force which he had joined in late 1944. He was later employed as a psychologist by Melbourne's St Vincent's Hospital, from 1961 until his retirement. He also maintained a busy private practice at his homes in the Melbourne suburbs of Canterbury and (later) Hawthorn, specialising in male difficulties and personal issues.

Many of Conway's articles appeared in The Age, The Australian, Quadrant and the now defunct National Times. He was a longtime film critic and media commentator for the (Catholic) Advocate. He had a long-standing association with the National Civic Council (NCC), led by right-wing Catholic activist B. A. Santamaria; at times Santamaria published Conway in the NCC's flagship journal, News Weekly. This association ended when an impassioned censure by Conway of the NCC, particularly concerning the issues of contraception, homosexuality and the parameters of papal infallibility ("Mr Santamaria - And Goodbye To All That", Quadrant, December 1990), led to a lasting estrangement between the two men. Conway also regretted the 1980s' split in the NCC which saw industrial elements of the organisation ejected. He believed Santamaria to have been the guiding force behind the split.

Conway also worked as a consultant for the Melbourne Catholic archdiocese, assessing seminary candidates. His admirers included Tony Abbott, Prime Minister 2013-15 (and Catholic). In his books and essays (as the above-mentioned reference to the Quadrant piece implies) Conway questioned Catholic teaching on sexual matters, allying himself with Freud, with Jung (both Freud and Jung are openly praised in The Great Australian Stupor as great pioneers in the study of the human psyche) and, periodically, with Eastern mysticism. This was chiefly because of Conway's interest in world religions and human belief systems in general. He emphasised the importance of wider human experience as an antidote to the "psychophobia" present in so many public exchanges.

Conway questioned the validity of Catholic teaching on artificial contraception, pointing to the misery of Africa and South America and maintaining that women had the right to regulate the size of their families in an acceptable fashion. He saw contraception as a "morally neutral" issue that the Church had no reason or right on which to opine. He also believed the church over-emphasised sexual sin above all others, which bemused him.

Conway was awarded the Medal of the Order of Australia in the 1991 Australia Day Honours for "service to the community, particularly as a medical science communicator".

One staunch defence of Freud by Conway was an article published in The Australian on 22 June 1994: "Integrity Attack Ignores Fruit of Freud's Genius". Conway also praised the psychotherapeutic use of LSD in the 1960s and 1970s, under the guidance of trained practitioners, and was critical of its withdrawal from use in the early 1970s. In his opinion the ban on LSD was caused largely by the questionable professional machinations of Timothy Leary in the US. Conway was also friends with Stanislav Grof, an early pioneer in the use of LSD as an aid in his consulting practice. He never changed his opinion that LSD was the most useful tool available for psychotherapists. Politically, Conway saw himself as an "old-time Whig conservative" with "gnostic" leanings and professionally "eclectic". Others saw him broadly as a neo-Freudian.

After the 1996 accession to Melbourne's archiepiscopate of George Pell, Conway grew less prominent in the media, although now and then he wrote for the Sydney Catholic magazine Annals Australasia, and Melbourne's Herald Sun newspaper, as well as periodically appearing on television.

Conway died at St Vincent's Hospital after suffering from Parkinson's disease and peripheral brain damage. He was farewelled in a Funeral Mass at St Patrick's Cathedral, attended by many prominent friends and former clients. His ashes were then interred at the cemetery in Brighton alongside the remains of his parents.

Following his death, accusations that he had sexually interfered with male patients were published by Broken Rites and, in 2019, by The Age.

== Bibliography ==
- Conway, Ronald (1971). The great Australian stupor : an interpretation of the Australian way of life. Melbourne: Sun Books. ISBN 9780725101282.
- — (1978). Land of the long weekend. Melbourne: Sun Books.
- The End of Stupor?: Australia Towards the Third Millennium (Melbourne: Sun Books, 1984)
- Being Male: A Guide for Masculinity in a Time of Change (South Melbourne: Macmillan, 1985)
- Conway's Way: Memories, Endeavours and Reflections (Blackburn, Victoria: Collins Dove, 1988)
- The Rage for Utopia (St Leonards, New South Wales: Allen & Unwin, 1992)
- — (May 1996). "The mind business". Letters. Quadrant. 40 (5): 4–5.
- — (July–August 1996). "The Freudian trigger". Letters. Quadrant. 40 (7–8): 5.
