= Norm and Ahmed =

- Written by: Alex Buzo
- Characters: Norm; Ahmed
- Original language: English
- Subject: Race relations
- Genre: Drama

Premiere
- Date premiered: 1968
- Place premiered: Old Tote Theatre, Sydney

Norm and Ahmed is a 1968 Australian play by Alex Buzo.

== Plot ==
A middle aged war veteran, Norm, has an encounter with a Pakistani student Ahmed, at a bus stop one night.

== Censorship controversy ==
The play script originally ended with the line "fucking' boong". This was changed to "bloody boong" for its debut production at the Old Tote, which was directed by Jim Sharman.

In April 1969 the play was performed at the Twelfth Night Theatre in Brisbane, using the writer's original line. After one performance, two policemen arrested Norman Staines, the actor who said the line, on a charge of using obscene language in public. Staines was set free on bail and continued to use the line. After a series of trials which went all the way to the High Court, the conviction was quashed.

At a performance of the play at La Mama Theatre in Melbourne in 1969 the actor playing Norm was summoned and ordered to appear in court. The actor, and director Graeme Blundell, were later fined.

== Adaptations ==
The play was adapted as a short feature in 1988 with Max Cullen as Norm and Alex Pinder as Ahmed.
