= Maureen Molloy =

Australian neuropsychology pioneer

Maureen Philomena Molloy
- Born: 25 August 1925; Ashfield, New South Wales, Australia
- Died: 21 May 2011 (aged 85); Melbourne, Victoria, Australia
- Citizenship: Australian
- Spouse: John Molloy
- Children: 7
- Scientific career
- Fields: Neuropsychology, cognitive rehabilitation, forensic neuropsychology
- Workplaces: University of Melbourne, University of Sydney

Maureen Philomena Molloy (née Clifton; 25 August 1925 – 21 May 2011) was an Australian pioneer of clinical neuropsychology, cognitive rehabilitation therapy and forensic neuropsychology.

== Early life ==
Maureen Molloy was born on in Ashfield, New South Wales in 1925 to John and Aileen Clifton. She was educated at Loreto Convent in Kirribilli, where she became head prefect and sports captain. She was awarded a bursary to study at University of Sydney and graduated with a Bachelor of Science, majoring in physics. She was the only female graduate in that year and was quickly appointed as a lecturer in physics at the university.

After meeting John Molloy at the university and falling in love, they married in 1950 and moved to New Caledonia for four years to support his career with Mobil Oil. She had seven children between 1951 and 1963. The last child had a severe intellectual disability, which prompted her to study psychology at the University of Melbourne.

== Career and studies ==
Studying psychology, Molloy gained a bachelor’s degree, master’s degree and PhD, with her studies increasingly focusing on the phenomenon of brain injuries and the effects and disturbances induced by such injuries. In the 1980s, she worked as a neuropsychologist at the Austin and St Vincent’s hospitals, while also working at the Commonwealth Rehabilitation Centre at Glen Waverley.

Molloy set up the Cognitive Rehabilitation Centre in 1986, a medical practice to provide rehabilitation for people suffering brain injuries from transport and workplace accidents. She used computer-based tools to aid the brain's recovery from injury. She visited overseas centres to meet with international scholars in the field and published a book on the subject with Julie Ann Garner.

In the 1990s, Molloy studied a Master of Science degree in cognitive neuroscience and focused on the use of artificial intelligence systems to model brain function. Her thesis focused upon the feasibility of developing a computer-based diagnostic advisory system with the potential to provide reliable assistance in the prediction of outcome for patients who had sustained head injuries. In the years after her thesis, she explored computer-generated options for assessing the neuroplasticity of the brain and models for assessing recovery from brain injury after traumatic injuries. In her own practice, Molloy began to specialise in the diagnosis and measurement of acquired brain injury and she became one of Australia’s leading private practitioners in the field.

By the late 1990s, Molloy was regularly called to be an expert witness in litigation related to head injury, a common outcome of motor vehicle and workplace accidents. This led her to study a law degree, graduating at 80 years old. As Molloy’s forensic career developed, she became the favoured neuropsychologist for plaintiff lawyers in Victoria. She continued in practice until the year prior to her death, continuing to assess the nature and extent of brain injuries from diverse sources, including from heavy metal poisoning.

== Maureen Molloy Medal ==
In 2017, the Maureen Molloy Prize in Clinical Neuropsychology was established at University of Melbourne as an award for the student with the highest average mark in the Master of Psychology (Clinical Neuropsychology) degree. The award is presented annually by the Melbourne School of Psychological Sciences and the Molloy family.

== Education ==
- Bachelor of Science in physics, University of Sydney (1945)
- Bachelor of Arts with Honours in psychology, University of Melbourne (1975)
- Master of Arts in psychology, University of Melbourne (1977)
- PhD in Neuropsychology, University of Melbourne (1984)
- Master of Science in cognitive neuroscience, University of Melbourne (1995)
- Bachelor of Laws, Deakin University (2006)

The subject of Molloy’s PhD was “Memory Outcome Following Blunt Head Injury”. It reviewed a sample of 150 patients who had sustained blunt trauma injury to the head and studied the sequelae of bilateral damage to their frontal-temporal-limbic structures. She concluded that deficits in the organisational aspects of memory are evidenced by tendencies to perseverate in errors and to lack flexibility in patterns of responding and in the feedback from errors, despite ongoing correction from such errors. This suggested to her the presence of cognition processing disorders related to attentional functions and to the organisational aspects of memory.

== Teaching ==
- Lecturer in Physics, University of Sydney (1946)
- Lecturer in Neuropsychology, University of Melbourne (1977)

== Books ==
- Molloy, Maureen; Stanley, G V; Walsh, K W (1979). Brain Impairment: Proceedings of the 1978 Brain Impairment Workshop. University of Melbourne.
- Molloy, Maureen; Walsh, Kevin (1979). Early detection of falloff in cognitive function in chronic alcoholics. University of Melbourne.
- Molloy, Maureen; Stanley, G V; Walsh, K W (1980). Brain Impairment: Proceedings of the 1979 Brain Impairment Workshop. University of Melbourne.
- Molloy, Maureen; Garner, Julie (1988). Neuropsychological Rehabilitation: Recovery from Brain Injury. Spectrum Publishing.

== Journal articles and thesis papers ==
- Molloy, Maureen (1983). "New perspectives in cognitive rehabilitation". Australian Rehabilitation Review. 7 (1): 34–37.
- Molloy, Maureen; Rand, Elizabeth; Brown, Wendy (1984). "Memory Retraining: A Study of Four Cases". Australian Occupational Therapy Journal. 31 (1): 20–27. doi:10.1111/j.1440-1630.1984.tb01450.x.
- Molloy, Maureen (1980). Memory outcome following blunt head injury. University of Melbourne.
- Molloy, Maureen (1995). Comparison of expert system and supervised and unsupervised machine learning approaches for the diagnosis of memory disorder following head injury. University of Melbourne.
