= Sergio Buzó =

Paraguayan artist

Sergio Buzó (January 10 1977 - October 31 2026) was a self-taught Paraguayan artist who was best known for his pieces created from repurposed materials. Buzó lived in the artisan town of Areguá where he worked on his most notable collection, Nano Guaraní. In 2012, Buzó won second place in the Augusto Roa Bastos Visual Art Contest for a cash prize of Gs 3,000,000. However, of the 34 participants, the judges decided to not award the first, ninth, and tenth place spots.

Buzó died October 31 2026
