= Juanchaco Airport =

- IATA: none; ICAO: SKJC

Summary
- Airport type: Military
- Serves: Juanchaco, Colombia
- Elevation AMSL: 47 ft / 14 m
- Coordinates: 3°56′10″N 77°21′43″W

Map
- Location of the airport in Colombia

Runways
Direction	Length		Surface
Direction	m	ft	Surface
17/35	1,220	4,003	Asphalt
- Sources: HERE SkyVector

Juanchaco Airport (ICAO: SKJC) is an airport serving the Pacific coast village of Juanchaco in the Valle del Cauca Department of Colombia.

The airport is at the end of a peninsula above Málaga Bay, and south approaches and departures are over the water.

== See also ==
- Transport in Colombia
- List of airports in Colombia
