= Ann Mitchell (cricketer) =

Australian cricketer and administrator

Helen Ann Mitchell OAM (born 5 April 1945, in Sydney, New South Wales) is an Australian former cricket player and administrator.

Mitchell began playing senior grade cricket with the Sydney University Cricket Club in 1962. A right-arm medium-pace bowler, Mitchell played 18 matches for the New South Wales women's cricket team from 1972 to 1982, and took 19 wickets at a bowling average of 19.52.

Mitchell was the president of the International Women's Cricket Council from 1982 to 1988.

Mitchell managed the Australia national women's cricket team for nine international series between 1976 and 1988, including the team's wins in the 1982 Women's Cricket World Cup and the 1988 Women's Cricket World Cup.

In the 1991 Australia Day Honours, Mitchell was awarded the Medal of the Order of Australia for "service to women's cricket".
