= Ladrilleros =

- Populated center
- Location in Valle del Cauca Department and Colombia Ladrilleros (Colombia)
- Coordinates: 3°56′21.84″N 77°21′51.48″W
- Country: Colombia
- Department: Valle del Cauca
- Municipality: Buenaventura
- Elevation: 75 ft (23 m)

Population (2005)
  - Total: 558
- Time zone: UTC-5 (Colombia Standard Time)

Ladrilleros is a populated center of Colombia in Buenaventura Municipality, Valle del Cauca Department in Colombia. The Juanchaco Airport serves both Ladrilleros and the nearby village of Juanchaco.

== Climate ==
Ladrilleros has an extremely wet tropical rainforest climate (Af) with very heavy to extremely heavy rainfall year-round.

Climate data for Ladrilleros
Month	Jan	Feb	Mar	Apr	May	Jun	Jul	Aug	Sep	Oct	Nov	Dec	Year
Mean daily maximum °C (°F)	29.3 (84.7)	29.8 (85.6)	30.0 (86.0)	30.0 (86.0)	29.9 (85.8)	29.6 (85.3)	29.4 (84.9)	29.1 (84.4)	28.7 (83.7)	28.4 (83.1)	28.5 (83.3)	28.8 (83.8)	29.3 (84.7)
Daily mean °C (°F)	25.8 (78.4)	26.1 (79.0)	26.2 (79.2)	26.3 (79.3)	26.2 (79.2)	25.9 (78.6)	25.9 (78.6)	25.8 (78.4)	25.4 (77.7)	25.3 (77.5)	25.3 (77.5)	25.6 (78.1)	25.8 (78.5)
Mean daily minimum °C (°F)	22.3 (72.1)	22.4 (72.3)	22.5 (72.5)	22.6 (72.7)	22.6 (72.7)	22.3 (72.1)	22.4 (72.3)	22.5 (72.5)	22.2 (72.0)	22.2 (72.0)	22.2 (72.0)	22.4 (72.3)	22.4 (72.3)
Average rainfall mm (inches)	350 (13.8)	293 (11.5)	342 (13.5)	469 (18.5)	685 (27.0)	660 (26.0)	673 (26.5)	763 (30.0)	865 (34.1)	879 (34.6)	799 (31.5)	594 (23.4)	7,372 (290.4)
Source: Climate-Data.org
