= Ian Spence =

Ian Spence may refer to:

- Ian Spence (footballer), Scottish former football player and manager
- Ian Spence (psychologist) (born 1944), Canadian psychologist
