= Juanchaco =

- Populated center
- Location in Valle del Cauca Department and Colombia Juanchaco (Colombia)
- Coordinates: 3°55′46.2″N 77°21′13.68″W
- Country: Colombia
- Department: Valle del Cauca
- Municipality: Buenaventura
- Elevation: 75 ft (23 m)

Population (2005)
  - Total: 946
- Time zone: UTC-5 (Colombia Standard Time)

Juanchaco is a populated center of Colombia in Buenaventura Municipality, Valle del Cauca Department in Colombia. The Juanchaco Airport serves both Juanchaco and the nearby village of Ladrilleros.

== Climate ==
Juanchaco has an extremely wet tropical rainforest climate (Af) with very heavy to extremely heavy rainfall year-round.

Climate data for Juanchaco
Month	Jan	Feb	Mar	Apr	May	Jun	Jul	Aug	Sep	Oct	Nov	Dec	Year
Mean daily maximum °C (°F)	29.3 (84.7)	29.8 (85.6)	30.0 (86.0)	29.9 (85.8)	29.9 (85.8)	29.6 (85.3)	29.4 (84.9)	29.0 (84.2)	28.8 (83.8)	28.4 (83.1)	28.5 (83.3)	28.7 (83.7)	29.3 (84.7)
Daily mean °C (°F)	25.8 (78.4)	26.1 (79.0)	26.2 (79.2)	26.1 (79.0)	26.2 (79.2)	25.9 (78.6)	25.8 (78.4)	25.6 (78.1)	25.5 (77.9)	25.3 (77.5)	25.3 (77.5)	25.4 (77.7)	25.8 (78.4)
Mean daily minimum °C (°F)	22.3 (72.1)	22.4 (72.3)	22.5 (72.5)	22.4 (72.3)	22.6 (72.7)	22.3 (72.1)	22.3 (72.1)	22.3 (72.1)	22.2 (72.0)	22.2 (72.0)	22.2 (72.0)	22.2 (72.0)	22.3 (72.2)
Average rainfall mm (inches)	349 (13.7)	293 (11.5)	342 (13.5)	469 (18.5)	684 (26.9)	658 (25.9)	672 (26.5)	763 (30.0)	864 (34.0)	879 (34.6)	799 (31.5)	594 (23.4)	7,366 (290)
Source: Climate-Data.org
