= James Howard Browne =

Australian photographer and botanist (1919–2004)

James Howard Browne OAM (September 1919 – 31 March 2004) was an Australian amateur botanist, plant photographer and collector of Mallee areas.

Browne was born in Melbourne in 1919 and grew up in Red Cliffs. He was awarded an Order of Australia medal in January 1991 and an honorary Master of Science degree from La Trobe University in April 1992 in recognition for his contribution to teaching and research. He was a great-nephew of John Nisbet, author of "Burma Under British Rule" and other works on forestry who also contributed to the "Victorian County Histories", and of Pollok Sinclair Nisbet and Robert Buchan Nisbet RSA RSW, Scottish artists.
