= Henry Bosch =

Australian businessman (1931–2026)

Henry Bosch AO
- Born: 20 January 1931
- Died: 25 January 2026 (aged 95)
- Education: Sydney University, Oxford University, Centre d’Etudes Industrielles
- Occupation: Businessman
- Known for: Worked to increase standards of corporate governance
- Notable work: Held over 30 directorships
- Awards: Officer of the Order of Australia, John Story Medal

Henry Bosch AO (20 January 1931 – 25 January 2026) was an Australian businessman, who was a CEO, chairman and governance advocate. He worked to increase standards of corporate governance, leading to his authorship of such reports as the 1991 Bosch Report: “Corporate Practices and Conduct”, The Workings of a Watchdog and The Director at Risk – Accountability in the Boardroom.

== Life and career ==
Bosch studied at Sydney and Oxford Universities and at the Centre d’Etudes Industrielles in Geneva. He resided at Wesley College while studying at Sydney University. Bosch spent his initial career in the manufacturing sector in the aluminum, steel, man-made fibres and plastics industries in Switzerland, Canada, the United Kingdom and Australia.

He held over 30 directorships including the following companies:

- Company Director of John Lysaght 1972
- Managing Director of Nylex Corporation 1980
- President of the Plastics Institute
- Chairman of the Chemicals and Plastics Industry Council
- Bosch committee in 1995

Bosch was appointed an Officer of the Order of Australia in 1991 for services to industry, commerce and government. He was awarded the John Story Medal by the Australian Institute of Management Education and Training in the same year.

He was adjunct professor in the School of Management at RMIT University.

Bosch died at home on 25 January 2026, at the age of 95.

== Bibliography ==
- (1986). Shareholder's Rights - ISBN 978-1-86350-348-8
