= Henry Malcolm Whyte =

Australian scientist (1920–2026)

Malcolm Whyte AO, FRCP, FRACP
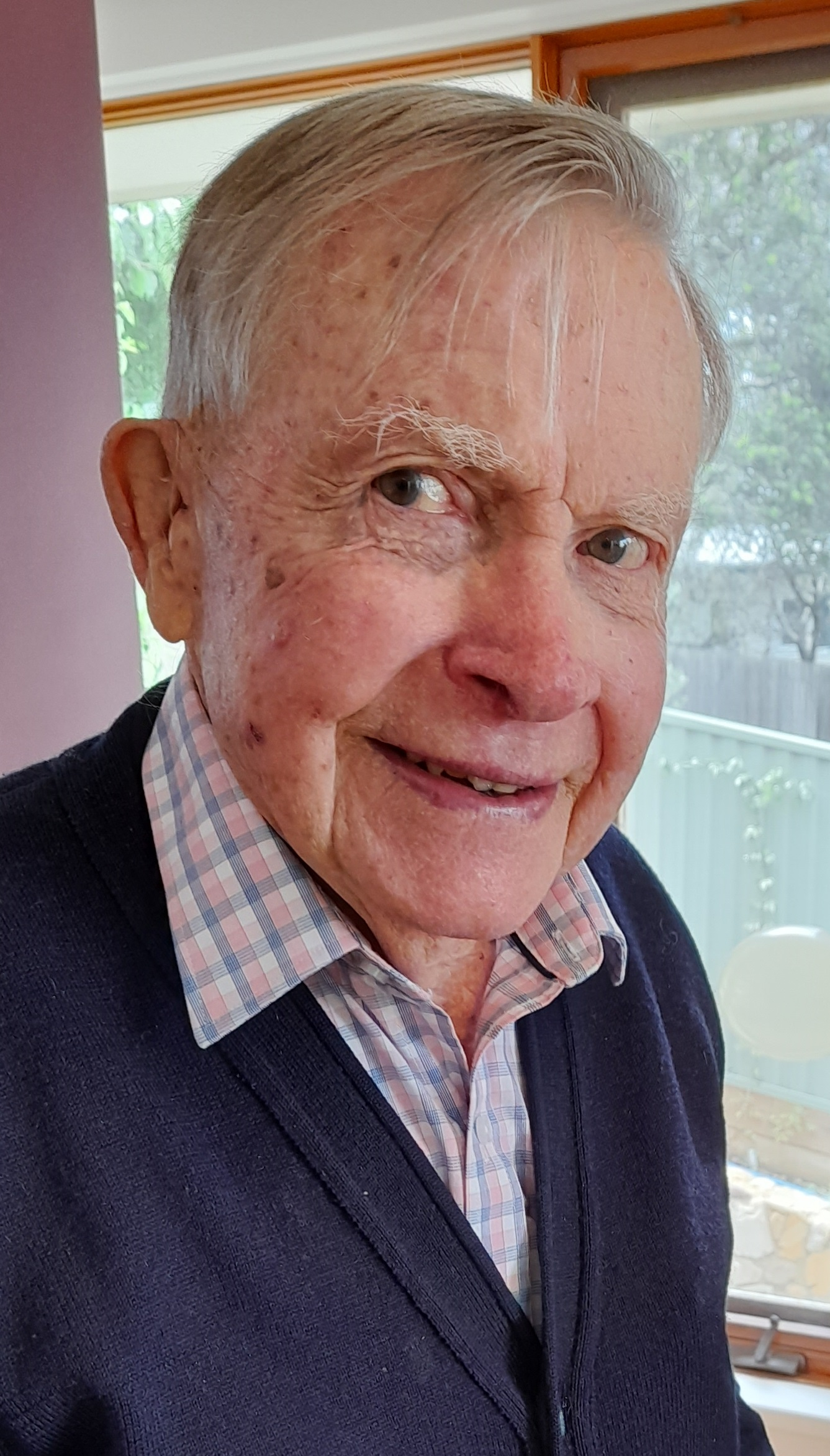
- Whyte in 2020
- Born: Henry Malcolm Whyte; 26 October 1920; Jammalamadugu, Madras Presidency, British India
- Died: 3 June 2026 (aged 105); Canberra, Australian Capital Territory, Australia
- Education: University of Oxford
- Awards: Officer of the Order of Australia
- Scientific career
- Workplaces: University of Queensland; John Curtin School of Medical Research, Australian National University
- Thesis: The local thermal effects of radiant heat in rheumatic and other subjects (1951)
- Military career
- Branch: Australian Army
- Service years: 1945–1946
- Rank: Captain
- Service number: Q273086; QX57647
- Unit: Australian Army Medical Corps
- Conflicts: Second World War; Borneo campaign

Henry Malcolm Whyte (26 October 1920 – 3 June 2026) was an Australian clinical scientist. A graduate of the University of Queensland, he served with the Australian Army in Borneo and Makassar in the aftermath of the Second World War. After the war he became a lecturer in Physiology at the University of Queensland. In 1947 he went to Oxford University on a Rhodes Scholarship, and earned his Doctor of Philosophy degree. He returned to Australia in 1952 and became a research fellow at the Kanematsu Memorial Institute of Pathology at Sydney Hospital.

In 1966, Whyte became the foundation professor and head of the Department of Clinical Science at the John Curtin School of Medical Research at the Australian National University in Canberra. He was made an Emeritus Professor in 1980. In later life, his activities included work with the community-based Alcohol and Drug Dependence Unit of the Australian Capital Territory Health Commission, service as acting director of Lifeline Canberra, and being a consultant for the Canberra Marriage Counselling Service. He was made an Officer in the Order of Australia in 1991.

== Early life and education ==
Henry Malcolm Whyte was born in Jammalamadugu, Madras Presidency, British India, on 26 October 1920, the youngest of four children of Australian Congregational missionaries Henry William Whyte and his wife Ruby Addison née Flower. He was educated at schools in Sydney and Ipswich Grammar School in Queensland.

In December 1937, Whyte was awarded a scholarship to the University of Queensland. He entered King's College there the following year and earned his Bachelor of Science degree in May 1942, and then Bachelor of Medicine and Bachelor of Surgery degrees in 1944, winning the University Medal. He participated in rowing as a coxswain. He did his residency at Brisbane and Maryborough General Hospitals.

== Second World War ==
The Second World War broke out while Whyte was at university, and Whyte was commissioned as an honorary captain in the Reserve of Officers. He was called up for service the Australian Army on 6 November 1944, but his service was deferred to allow him to complete his residency. He was inducted on 24 May 1945 with the substantive rank of captain. Four days later he volunteered for overseas service with the Second Australian Imperial Force (AIF), and received the AIF service number QX57647. On 17 August, he was appointed Regimental Medical Officer (RMO) of the 1st Parachute Training Centre.

Whyte proceeded overseas by air to Morotai on 2 September and then went to Balikpapan as RMO of the 2/14th Battalion. The battalion moved to Makassar to accept the surrender of the Japanese forces there. On 24 February 1946, he embarked for Australia on the SS Georgetown Victory. He was posted to the 102nd General Hospital and then to the 112th General Hospital on 18 July 1946. On that day, he married Marguerite Mary Lamont at St Andrew's Presbyterian Church in Brisbane. He was released from active service on 21 August 1946 and transferred to the Reserve of Officers, where he remained until his service obligation ended on 26 September 1952.

== Academia ==
Whyte returned to the University of Queensland as a senior lecturer in physiology. In November 1946, he was chosen as a Rhodes scholar for 1947. The Rhodes scholarship scheme had been suspended during the war, and when it was reinstated, the criteria were relaxed, allowing scholars to be older and married, as Whyte was. He studied at the University of Oxford as an assistant to the Nuffield Professor of Clinical Medicine, Leslie John Witts. In 1951, he was awarded his D.Phil. degree, writing his thesis on "The local thermal effects of radiant heat in rheumatic and other subjects", and became a member of the Royal College of Physicians. He became a fellow in 1971.

Whyte returned to Australia, where he became the senior clinical research fellow at the Kanematsu Memorial Institute of Pathology at Sydney Hospital and part-time lecturer in physiology at the University of Sydney. He became the director of the Kanematsu Memorial Institute in 1960. He became a member of the Royal Australasian College of Physicians in 1956 and a fellow in 1962. In 1966, he became the foundation professor and head of the Depart of Clinical Science at the John Curtin School of Medical Research in Canberra. He remained there until 1977, except for a period of six months as a visiting member of staff in the Department of Clinical Epidemiology and Biostatistics at McMaster University Medical School in Canada. He became a fellow of the Royal College of Physicians in 1971.

== Later life and death ==
On 10 October 1974, after divorce from Marguerite Lamont, Whyte married Judith Angus., from whom he was divorced in 1999. From 1977 to 1984, he was a senior specialist with the Drug and Alcohol Service of the Australian Capital Territory Health Commission. He was a visiting fellow with the Department of Clinical Science at the Australian National University (ANU) and became an emeritus professor in 1980. He was a visiting fellow at the ANU National Health and Medical Research Council's Social Psychiatry Unit from 1977 to 1979 and at the Department of Psychology from 1983 to 1984. From 1984 to 1985 he was a Consultant in Community Health with the Northern Territory Department of Health based in Darwin. On return to Canberra, from 1985 to 1987 he was a medical officer with the Red Cross Blood Transfusion Service and a sessional senior specialist with the Commonwealth Rehabilitation Service in Canberra from 1987 to 1991. He was also a consultant at Canberra Marriage Counselling Service for a time in 1988 and part-time acting director of Lifeline Canberra for six months in 1988 and 1989. He chaired a review of health sciences education in South Australia in 1991, and was Commissioner of Complaints for the National Health and Medical Research Council from 1997 to 1999.

In 1991 Whyte was made an Officer in the Order of Australia for service to clinical science and to the community.

Whyte died on 3 June 2026, at the age of 105.
