= Zihni Buzo =

Albanian Australian civil engineer

Zihni Buzo OAM
- Born: Zihni Jusuf Buzo; 1912; Berat, Albania
- Died: July 2006 (aged 93–94); Sydney, New South Wales, Australia
- Education: Harry Fultz School; Robert College; Harvard University
- Occupation: Civil engineer

Zihni Jusuf Buzo OAM (1912–2006) was an Albanian Australian civil engineer.

== Biography ==
Zihni Jusuf Buzo was born (1912) in the neighbourhood of Murat Çelepia in Berat, Albania. In Albania, Buzo attended primary school in Berat. In his youth, Buzo was a member of the Albanian boy scouts. He attended the Harry Fultz school in Tirana and achieved good results earning Buzo a scholarship to study at the American Robert College in Istanbul, Turkey. Buzo graduated with honours and gained a scholarship from the Rockefeller Foundation to study at Harvard University in the US. He graduated university with good grades and as a result of social connections made at Harvard, Buzo was employed by an Anglo-American company as a civil engineer in Albania. Water supply projects were the area where Buzo worked on in Greece and Albania, in particular to combat malaria and he had a keen interest in environmental impacts. He worked in Albania (1935–1939) until the World War II occupation of the country by Axis forces and company employees including Buzo left the country.

Buzo migrated to Australia and worked as a civil engineer, often involved in projects within the New England region of New South Wales. He got a position at New England University in Armidale, NSW. In northern NSW, Buzo joined the Oaky River Hydro Electric Scheme. Although the project experienced some environmental and fiscal challenges, Buzo developed a design and implemented the dam's construction on the Oaky River during the 1950s. The completed dam provided thousands of people in Armidale with electricity. Buzo filmed the dam construction from beginning to end. After Buzo's death in 2006, the footage was acquired by the Australian National Film and Sound Archive and made into a film about the dam and his life in 2015.

From the 1960s onward, Buzo was employed at the World Health Organization for fourteen years and worked on public health projects spanning more than forty countries in Africa, Asia and South America. During the 1990s, Buzo was involved in lobbying activities and participated in Albanian community delegations where he met Australia's Foreign Minister Gareth Evans and raised the issue of Kosovo and its Albanian population multiple times. He helped numerous Albanians from Albania settle in Australia.

== Personal life ==
In 1941, Buzo met Elaine Johnson, an Australian teacher of Irish descent and both married the following year. The couple had two sons, Alex Buzo (1944–2006), a writer and playwright born in Sydney, and Adrian Buzo born in Brisbane (1948–2025), a Korean studies scholar and former Australian diplomat. His granddaughter is Eva Buzo, an Australian human rights lawyer and long–distance swimmer who was the first woman to swim from Lecce, Italy to Vlorë, Albania in honour of her grandfather.

In the 1991 Australia Day Honours, Buzo's contribution toward the community was recognised in Australia and he was awarded the Order of Australia medal. Buzo was a member of the American Society of Civil Engineers. Engineers Australia bestowed Buzo with an Honorary Fellowship, an award he cherished above others as it was from his colleagues. Buzo died in July 2006.

== External sources ==
- Lindsay, Judy (1998). "Zihni Buzo - Interviewed 1998". Living Histories. University of Newcastle.
- The Dam Zihni Built (Film). University of Newcastle. December 2015.
- Buzo, Zihni (2000). "Albania to Australia" (Unpublished manuscript). National Library of Australia.
