= Alex Buzo =

Australian writer

- Born: Alexander John Buzo; 23 July 1944; Sydney, New South Wales, Australia
- Died: 15 August 2006 (aged 62); Sydney, New South Wales, Australia
- Citizenship: Australian
- Education: The Armidale School; International School of Geneva; University of New South Wales
- Occupations: playwright, author
- Children: 3
- Writing career
- Notable works: Norm and Ahmed; Rooted; Coralie Lansdowne Says No

Alexander John Buzo (23 July 1944 – 16 August 2006) was an Australian playwright and author who wrote 88 works. His literary works recorded Australian culture through wit, humour and extensive use of colloquial Australian English.

== Early life ==
Alex Buzo was born on 23 July 1944 in Sydney. His father Zihni Jusuf Buzo (1912-2006) was from Berat, Albania, an American Harvard University graduate and civil engineer of Albanian origin. Elaine Johnson, an Australian teacher of Irish descent was his mother. Buzo's brother, Adrian Buzo (born 1948, Brisbane) is a Korean studies scholar and former Australian diplomat.

The first school Buzo attended was the Middle Harbour Primary School. Buzo's interests in his early years were shaped by his influential mother's sister Ailsa, a theatre and movie goer. At age 10, Buzo and the whole family went to live in Armidale when his father got a position at the University of New England. Buzo attended The Armidale School where his interest in drama developed. His father later was employed in Switzerland and Buzo attended the International School of Geneva. He formed a lifelong interest for both cricket and rugby in his youth where he participated as a player in team sports. Buzo returned to Australia and held a job at the Sydney Stock Exchange for a year. He attended and was a successful student at the Australian National University. Later he went to the University of New South Wales, which had Australia's first drama course and graduated in 1965 with a Bachelor of Arts degree. At the time Buzo worked as a barman in the Sydney suburb of Neutral Bay at The Oaks hotel.

== Career ==
=== Playwriting career ===
Buzo started acting with the inner Sydney New Theatre company after being inspired by director Aarne Neeme and the National Institute of Dramatic Art (NIDA). Later in Sydney he became a playwright at 21 and Buzo emerged as a prominent figure among Australian dramatists, part of the New Wave group. Buzo was also involved with the Melbourne based Australian Performing Group (APG). His talent was nurtured and developed at the Producers Authors Composers and Talent (PACT) Centre, founded in 1964.

In 1966 Buzo wrote The Revolt. Norm and Ahmed was written in 1968 after his friend Pakistani student Mohammed Kazim ("Kaz") was harassed in a pub by an older white Australian. The play explored issues of racism within Australia and was a one act drama centred on two characters, the Anglo-Australian engineer Norm and a Pakistani student Ahmed at a bus stop. The controversial play brought Buzo into the national spotlight and it was performed widely in Australian cities and also in Britain and the US. Debates over censorship in theatre followed and the use of colourful Australian expressions like "fuckin' boong" in the play's last line resulted in obscenity charges against Buzo, then court cases with the matter ending up at the High Court in 1970. The charges were eventually quashed by the Attorney-General.

During 1969, Buzo wrote two plays The Front Room Boys and Rooted. The name Rooted got Buzo into difficulties as in Australian colloquial terminology the term used as a pun can mean sexual relations. He wrote The Roy Murphy Show, a satirical play about a rugby television panel show in 1971 and two others in 1972, Macquarie, exploring issues of Australian identity and the past and Tom. At age 28, Buzo became a resident playwright with the Melbourne Theatre Company.

In 1974, Buzo's Coralie Lansdowne Says No achieved much success and was about a woman's struggle for independence and challenges she encounters in life. Other plays explored similar themes regarding social alienation and the pursuit of individuals seeking to attain and find purpose in a world that prevents it from happening like Martello Towers in 1976 and Makassar Reef in 1978. Buzo was at the height of his career as his plays were often sold out performances and well received by attending audiences.

In 1980 Buzo wrote the Big River, in 1983 The Marginal Farm, in 1987 Stingray, in 1988 Shellcove Road and in 1995 Pacific Union. Buzo was one of the early playwrights of the New Wave group to gain international attention for Makassar Reef, Rooted and Tom, being well received in the US. Buzo's plays have also been performed in south East Asia and the UK. Over the span of his career, Buzo was also a writer-in-residence for various schools, universities and theatre companies.

Businessman David Hill, an Oaks Hotel coworker from Buzo's university days, sued him for defamation in the 1980s over an unsavoury character claimed to be based on Hill in Makassar Reef. Both Hill and Buzo reconciled in 1990.

=== Subsequent career ===
In later years, Buzo wrote fiction including prose and topics covered ranged from the misusage of everyday language to sport. Books he wrote on the Australian language and life that achieved popularity were Tautology and Meet the New Class both in 1981, Glancing Blows in 1987, The Young Persons Guide to the Theatre in 1988, Kiwese in 1994 and A Dictionary of the Almost Obvious in 1998. Two novels by Buzo were The Search for Harry Allway in 1985 and Prue Flies North in 1991. He wrote news articles about rugby and important books on cricket, the Legends of the Baggy Green (2004) and coauthored The Longest Game: A Collection of the Best Cricket Writing from Alexander to Zavos, from the Gabba to the Yabba (1992).

In his writing career he wrote for the children's animation show, Arthur and the Square Knights of the Round Table.

In 2001, he gave the 3rd annual Tom Brock Lecture.

=== Death ===
Buzo died in Sydney on 16 August 2006 after several years battling cancer.

== Style ==
Early in his career, Buzo's writing style and use of wit was similar to his Australian playwright contemporary David Williamson. Sometimes during his career, comparisons of Buzo to British playwright Harold Pinter were made. Like Pinter, Buzo's works were marked by surrealism, use of triviality, colloquial expressions and language. Over time Buzo's works also employed romanticism. The topic of social alienation was often explored in Buzo's plays through their characters. Buzo was an observer of language and it was reflected in his writing style through wit, humour and clever use of colloquial Australian English.

He wrote articles on many varied subjects including reviews and travel writing.

== Personal life ==
Buzo was married for forty years to Merelyn Johnson ("Jock"), an art teacher from Armidale and the couple had three daughters, Emma, Laura and Genevieve and several grandchildren. He supported the North Sydney Bears (later known as the Northern Eagles) and participated in the failed campaign to stop its demotion from the National Rugby League.

== Legacy ==
=== The Alex Buzo Company ===
In 2007, Buzo's eldest daughter Emma formed The Alex Buzo Company. Its aim is to produce, promote and perpetuate the work of Alex Buzo both in Australia and internationally. The company is supported by the Buzo family and manages his estate. It is dedicated to fostering the same level of excellence Buzo achieved in his career in contemporary Australian literature through innovative programs of theatre, education and training.

In honour of Buzo's life work, the Alex Buzo Shortlist Prize was created (2006) for Australian writers.

== Awards ==
- 1972 Gold Medal from the Australian Literature Society for his history play Macquarie
- 1998 an Alumni Award from the University of New South Wales
- 2005 Honorary Doctorate of Letters from UNSW for his contribution to Australian Literature.

== Works ==
=== Plays ===
- The Revolt (1967)
- Norm and Ahmed (Currency Press, 1968)
- The Front Room Boys (Currency Press, 1970)
- Macquarie (Currency Press, 1971)
- Batman's Beach-Head (1973)
- Rooted (Currency Press, 1973)
- Roy Murphy Show (Currency Press, 1973)
- Coralie Lansdowne Says No (Currency Press, 1974)
- Tom (Angus & Robertson, 1975)
- Vicki Madison Clocks Out (Currency Press, 1976)
- Martello Towers (Currency Press, 1976)
- Makassar Reef (Currency Press, 1978)
- Big River (Currency Press, 1985)
- The Marginal Farm (Currency Press, 1985)
- Stingray (Currency Press, 1987)
- Shellcove Road (1989)
- Pacific Union (Currency Press, 1995)

=== Non-fiction ===
- Legends of the Baggy Green (Allen & Unwin, Sydney, 2004)
- A Dictionary of the Almost Obvious (The Text Publishing Company, Melbourne, 1998)
- Kiwese (Mandarin, Port Melbourne, 1994)
- The Longest Game: A Collection of the Best Cricket Writing from Alexander to Zavos, from the Gabba to the Yabba, co-edited with Jamie Grant (Mandarin, Port Melbourne, 1990, ISBN 0855613793)
- The Young Persons Guide to the Theatre (Penguin, Ringwood, 1988)
- Glancing Blows (Penguin, Ringwood, 1987)
- Meet the New Class (Angus and Robertson, Sydney, 1981)
- Tautology (Penguin, Ringwood, 1981)

=== Fiction ===
- Prue Flies North (Mandarin, Port Melbourne, 1991)
- The Search for Harry Allway (Angus and Robertson, Sydney 1985)

=== Cartoon scripts ===
- With Rod Hull and others, Arthur! and the Square Knights of the Round Table (1966–1968)

=== Live-action film screenplays ===
- Ned Kelly (1970) (uncredited)

=== Animated film screenplays ===
Out of the eight Dickens adaptations by Burbank Animation Studios, four were adapted by Buzo:

- A Christmas Carol (1982)
- Great Expectations (1983)
- David Copperfield (1983)
- The Old Curiosity Shop (1984)

== Other sources ==
- A comprehensive list of articles on Alex Buzo can be found on the "Media and Links" page of The Alex Buzo Company website.
- "Playwright, Alex Buzo, dies". ABC PM.
- "Agent Details - Alex Buzo". Austlit.
- "Author Profile - Alex Buzo". Currency Press. Archived from the original on 24 July 2008.
- "Plays by Alex Buzo". The Playwrights Database. Archived from the original on 11 June 2008.
