= Tess Cramond =

Australian physician and anesthetist (1926–2015)

Teresa (Tess) Rita O'Rourke Cramond (née Brophy) AO, OBE (1926–2015) was an Australian anaesthetist and the director of the Multidisciplinary Pain Centre at the Royal Brisbane Hospital. Her career spanning fifty years, was dedicated to improving the use of anaesthesia, resuscitation and pain medicine, with specific reference to the relief of cancer pain and palliative care.

Cramond, then Brophy, was born on 26 February 1926 in Maryborough, Queensland to a devout Catholic family. Her father was a Railway Superintendent. Her three sisters also pursued higher education. Brophy attended Eagle Junction State School and St Ursula's College in Toowoomba during World War II. In 1944, she won an Open Scholarship to study at the University of Queensland, where she enrolled in medicine. Brophy was active in student life and resided at Women's College. She graduated in 1951.

== Career ==
Brophy commenced work as a Resident Medical Officer in 1951, at the Royal Brisbane Hospital. She was Senior Resident Medical Officer (Anaesthetist) in 1953 and Registrar the following year. Brophy took a Diploma degree in Anaesthetics from the Royal College of Physicians, London and the Royal College of Surgeons, UK in 1955. She received the Nuffield Prize in the same year, and moved to London, where she was Anaesthetics Registrar at Poplar Hospital, London in 1955 and at the London Hospital in 1956. It was while Brophy was in London that she studied techniques that she would bring back to Australia. In time, she advocated for new trainees to receive similar experience in overseas clinics to develop their skills.

Brophy returned to Australia as Senior Anaesthetist in the Kenneth G Jamieson Neurosurgical Unit of the Royal Brisbane Hospital from 1957 to 1991 and pursued changes in the use of anaesthesia. She was Senior Honorary Anaesthetist at Mater Children's Hospital from 1958 to 1973.

In 1961, Brophy and colleague Roger Bennett, demonstrated resuscitation techniques for use in surf lifesaving CPR. Their recommendations led to changes in rescue services and improved survival rates. Their work with the surf lifesaving association ultimately led to the signs required by all modern backyard and public pools, showing basic cardio pulmonary resuscitation, in conjunction with work by the Australian Resuscitation Council. After Roger Bennett's death in 1967 due to cancer, Brophy took up the challenging issue of pain management, but continued her commitment to surf lifesaving as their medical adviser for 30 years. She also advised the Queensland Electricity Commission's Safety Advisory Board from 1976 to 1987 on appropriate rescue and resuscitation techniques, for workers out in the field.

Brophy was made Director of the Multidisciplinary Pain Centre which she established at the Royal Brisbane Hospital in 1967, the second centre of its kind in Australia. It was renamed for her in 2008. She also served as a Consultant Anaesthetist and Army Officer Colonel (Retired) in the Royal Australian Army Medical Corps from 1977 to 1986. She was Professor of Anaesthetics at the University of Queensland from 1978 to 1993.

Brophy was a founding member of the Brisbane branch of the Order of Malta in 1974. This organization oversaw work in health and education projects in Timor Leste, the Mt Sion Eye Project in Papua New Guinea and for Mount Olivet Hospice Home Care Service in Brisbane.

== Awards ==
- 1967 Gilbert Brown Prize
- 1977 Officer of the Order of the British Empire (OBE)
- 1979 Dame Magistral Grace Sovereign, Military Order of St John of Jerusalem, Rhodes and Malta
- 1982 Gold Medal from the Faculty of Anaesthetists of the Royal Australian College of Surgeons
- 1986 Advance Australia Award
- 1987 Orton Medal from the Faculty of Anaesthetists, Royal Australian College of Surgeons (RACS)
- 1991 Officer of the Order of Australia (AO)
- 1992 Red Cross Long Service Award
- 1994 Distinguished Service Award, Australian Red Cross
- AMA Women in Medicine Award
- Distinguished Member Award of the Australian Pain Society
- Honorary Fellowship of the Australian Chapter of Palliative Medicine
- Doctor of Medicine Honoris Causa from the University of Queensland
- Doctor of the University from the Australian Catholic University

== Memberships ==
- 1978–1981 Member of the Anti-Cancer Council of Queensland
- 1981 President of the Australian Medical Association, Queensland
- 1991–1995 Member of the Royal Brisbane Hospital Foundation
- 1992–1996 Member of the Senate of the Australian Catholic University
- Honorary Life Member of Surf Lifesaving Queensland and Surf Lifesaving Australia

== Personal life ==
Brophy married widower Dr Humphry Cramond in Brisbane, in 1985. Brophy and Cramond had known one another since their days as medical students. Cramond, whose practice was in Dalby moved to Brisbane where his wife's work was focused. Brophy took her husband's surname after their marriage.

Cramond died on 26 December 2015. Her service was held at St Stephens Cathedral in Brisbane. Her husband Humphry predeceased her in 2014. She is buried beside her husband at Nudgee Cemetery. She was survived by her nieces, nephew and stepchildren.

== Legacy ==
Annual Tess Brophy Lecture
