= Albanian Mosque, Dandenong =

Mosque in Melbourne, Victoria, Australia

Albanian Mosque Albanian Islamic Centre Mosque Albanian Sakie Islamic Centre
- Albanian: Xhamija Shqiptare Dandenong Këshavë
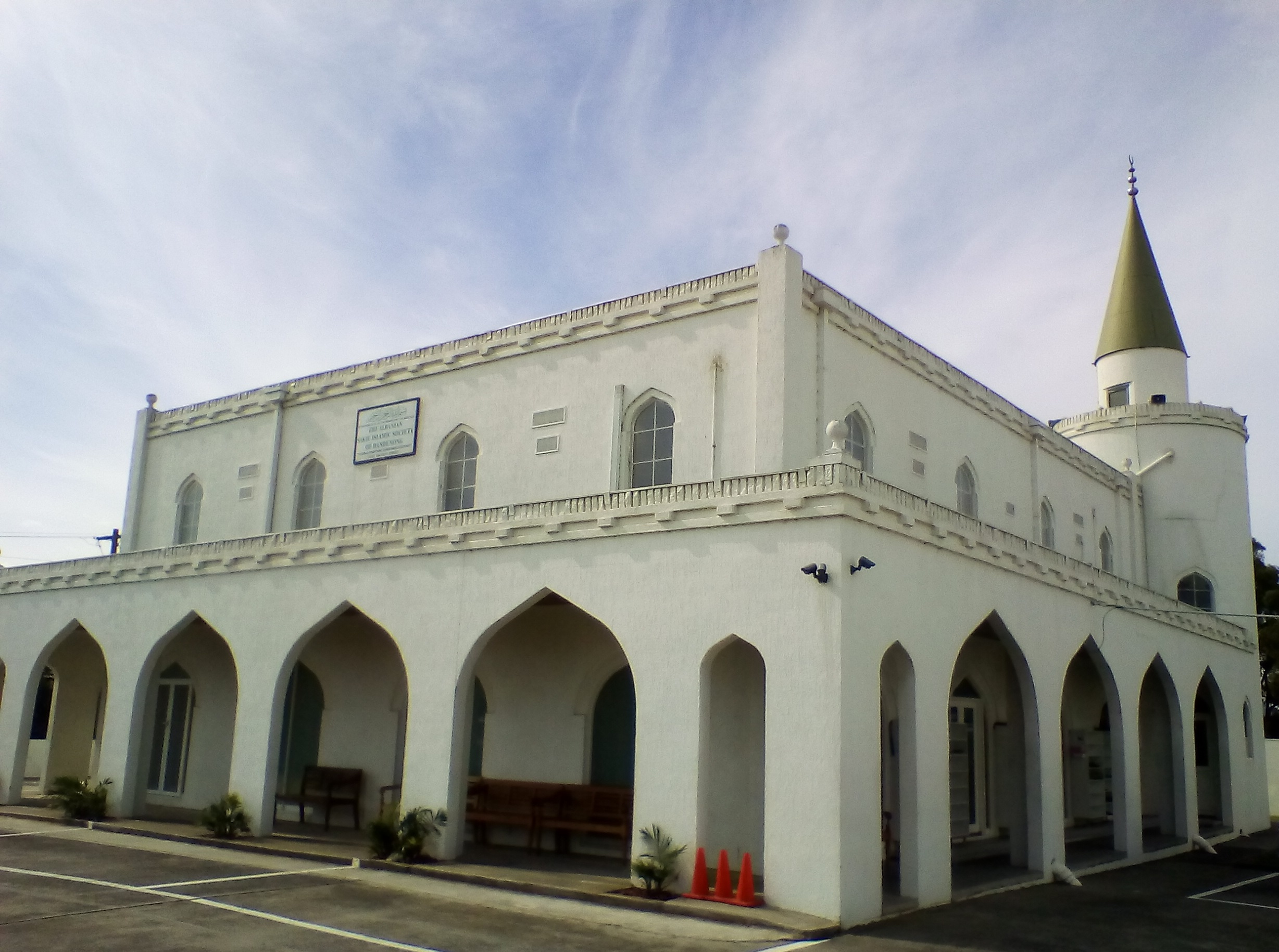

- Location in greater metropolitan Melbourne

Religion
- Affiliation: Sunni Islam
- Ecclesiastical or organisational status: Mosque
- Ownership: Albanian Sakie Islamic Society of Dandenong
- Status: Active

Location
- Location: 10-12 Dalgety St, Dandenong 3175, Melbourne, Victoria
- Country: Australia
- Coordinates: 37°59′39″S 145°12′30″E

Architecture
- Type: Mosque architecture
- Completed: 1985
- Minaret: 1

Website
- Dandenong Albanian Islamic Society

The Albanian Mosque (Albanian: Xhamija Shqiptare Dandenong Këshavë), also known as the Albanian Islamic Centre Mosque and Albanian Sakie Islamic Centre, is a mosque located in Dandenong, a south eastern suburb of Melbourne, Victoria, Australia. It is one of the earliest mosques in the country.

The mosque is a large building, built next to Dandenong Creek and residential neighbourhood, with a minaret, and community facilities. Associated with the Albanian Australian community, the mosque is owned by and the centre of the Albanian Sakie Islamic Society of Dandenong.

== History ==
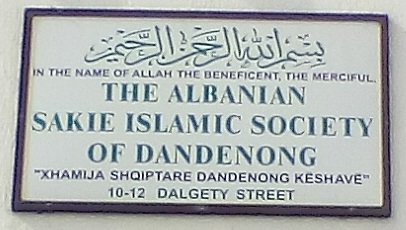
Mosque plaque

Albanian immigrants mainly from Kišava (Albanian: Këshavë), a village in south-western North Macedonia arrived and settled in Dandenong from the early 1960s onward and over many decades became a large and concentrated community living in the area. A mosque was built and opened in 1985.

At the mosque, Albanians are in charge of administrative functions, whereas the Islamic Association of Australia, an organisation with multicultural members also uses the premises. Mosque membership is mainly composed of Albanians with a Kišava origin. The committee of the Dandenong Albanian Sakie Islamic Society, an influential organisation among Dandenong Albanians, has it stipulated in the mosque constitution that only individuals with Kišava Albanian origins can be on its board. The mosque holds sway over the provision of services conducted by the imam, such as Islamic prayers, Sunday school, and undertaking other events (circumcisions, weddings, funerals and so on). Only people with membership can have a funeral at the mosque, although exceptions have occurred for other non-Albanian Muslims.

Albanians in Dandenong are composed by cultural Muslims, some of them are religious. In the early twenty first century, regular attendance to the mosque consists of a small number of Albanian men. The rest of the congregation are mainly Turks, some Afghans and Muslims from other backgrounds. Few women, often elderly, go to the mosque, unless in the event of a funeral where attendance increases especially if it is of a woman. According to community members, low attendance by local Albanians is due to work and raising children preoccupying people and making it difficult to visit the mosque and pray. Individuals attending mosque school are from a non-Albanian background. Mosque sermons are mainly conducted in the Albanian language, with some English for non-Albanian Muslim worshipers.

== Gallery ==
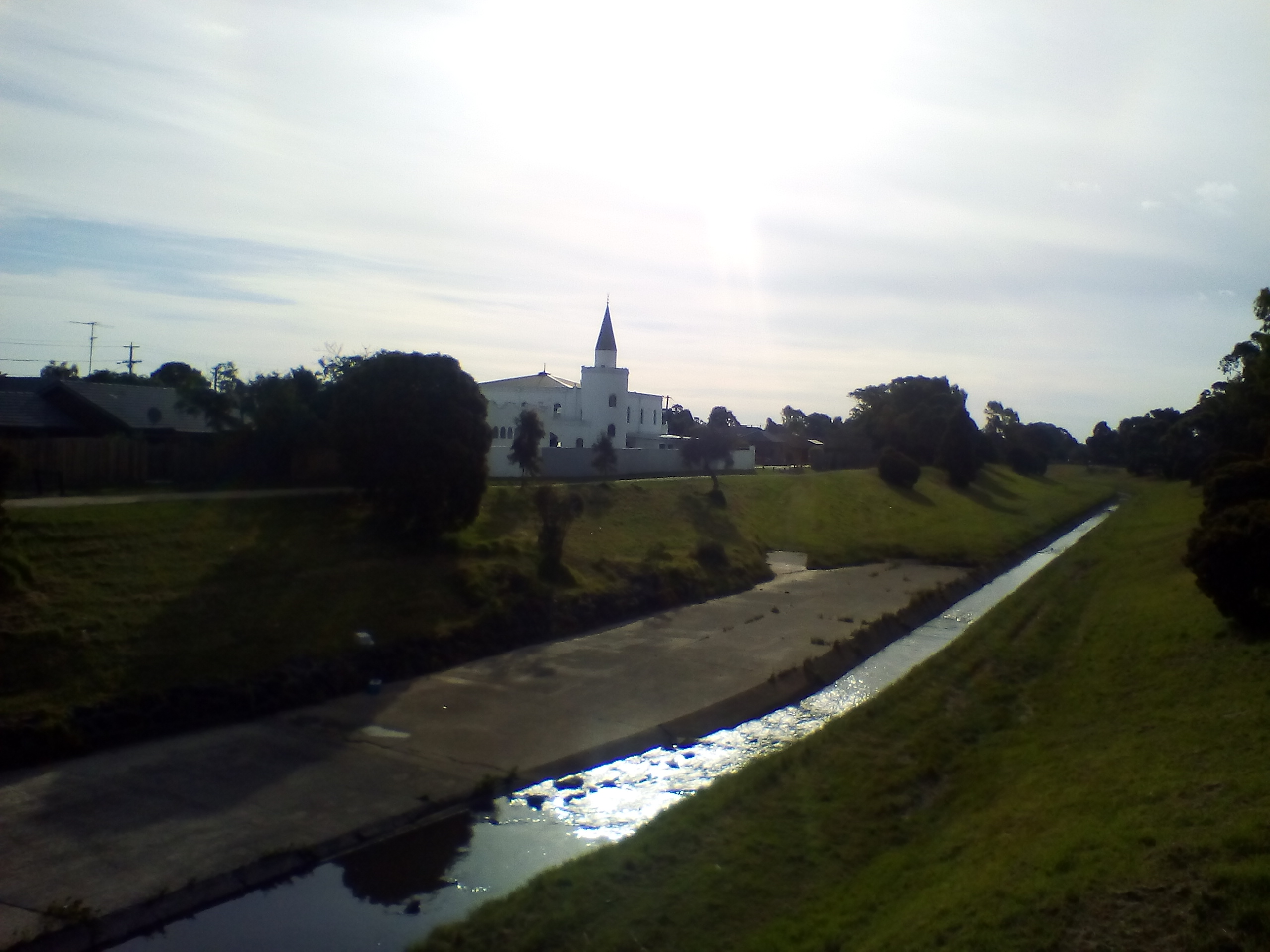
View of mosque from bridge over Dandenong Creek

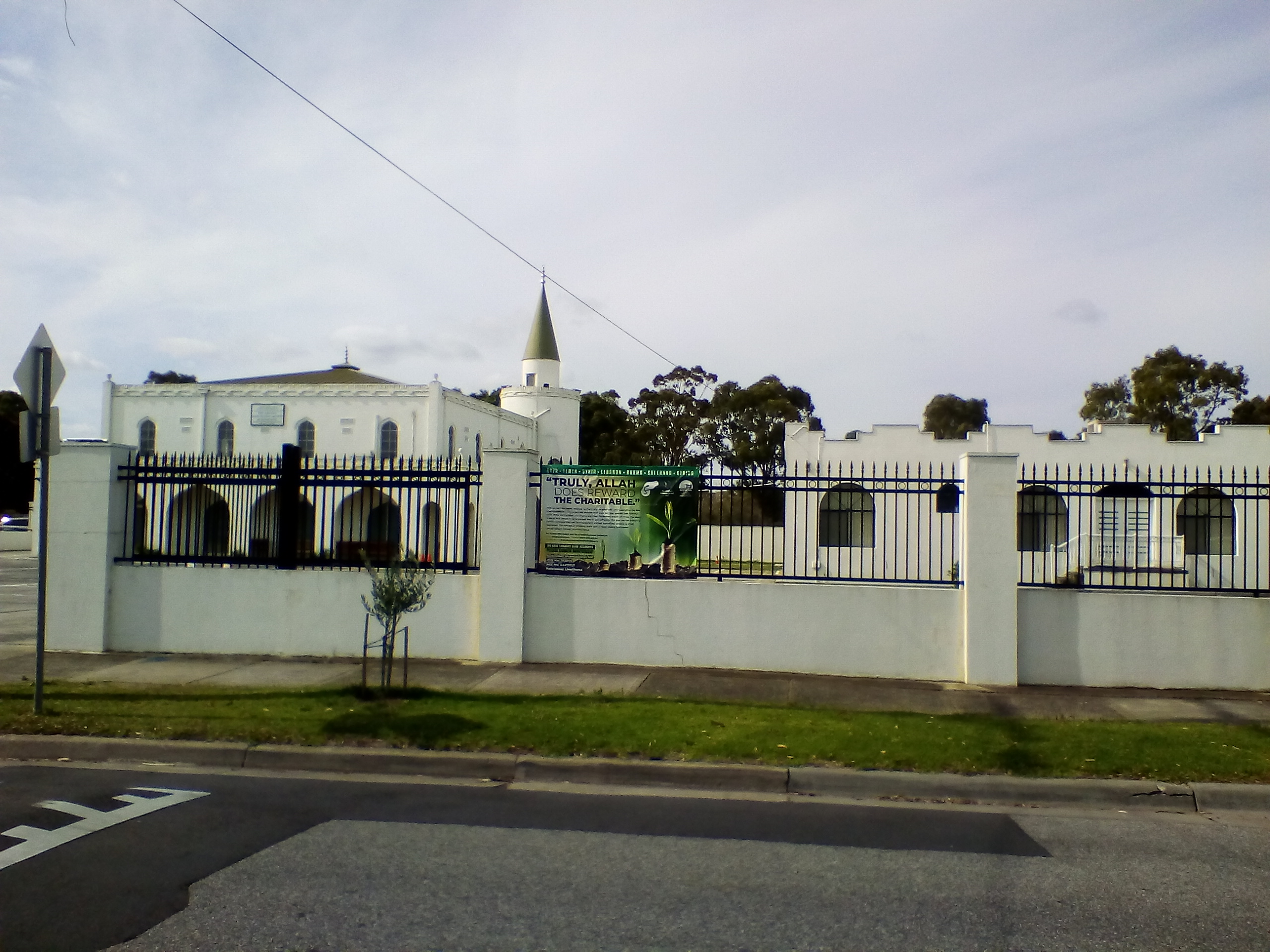
View from Dalgety Rd. Mosque (left) and its community facilities (right)

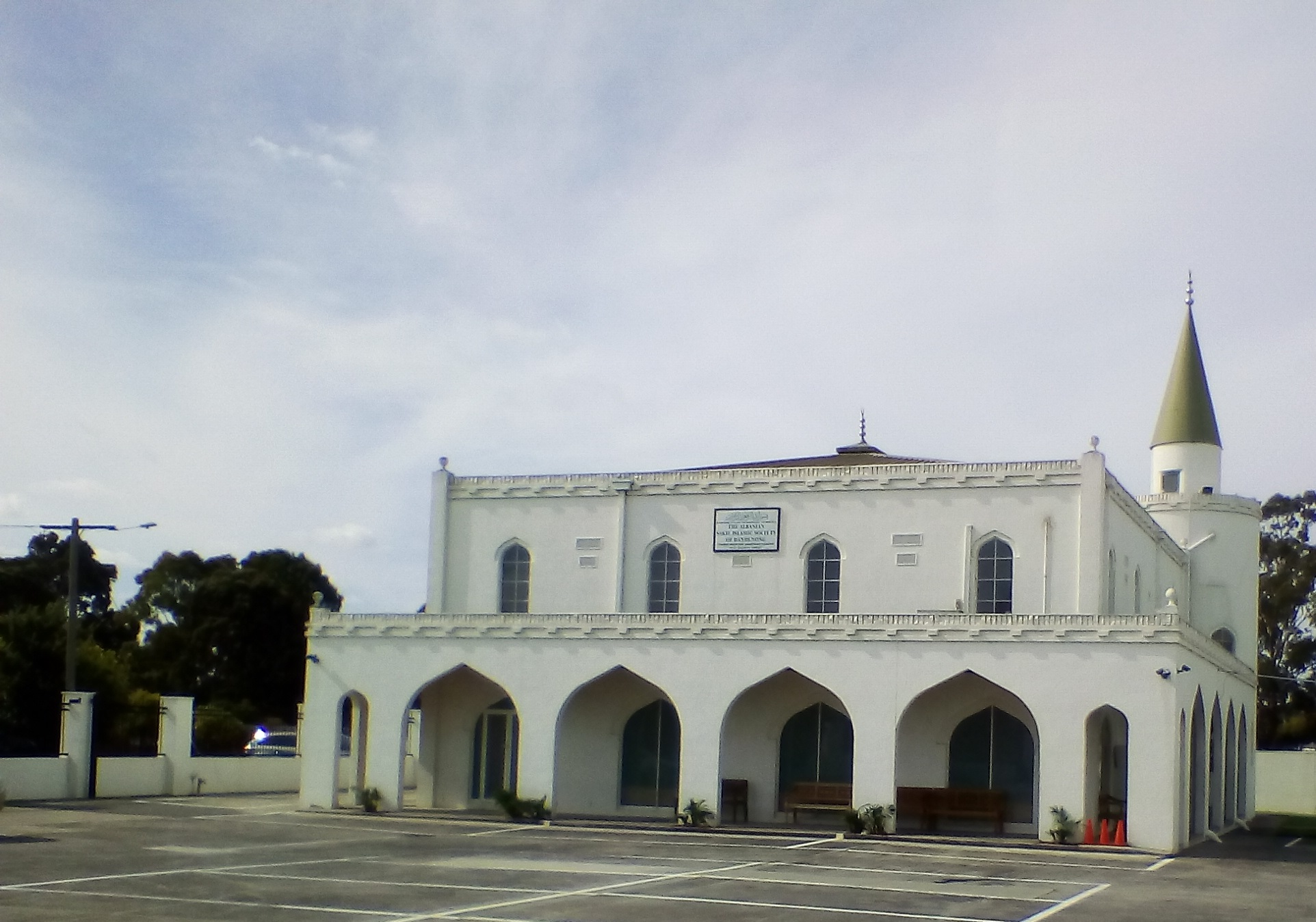
Mosque and car park

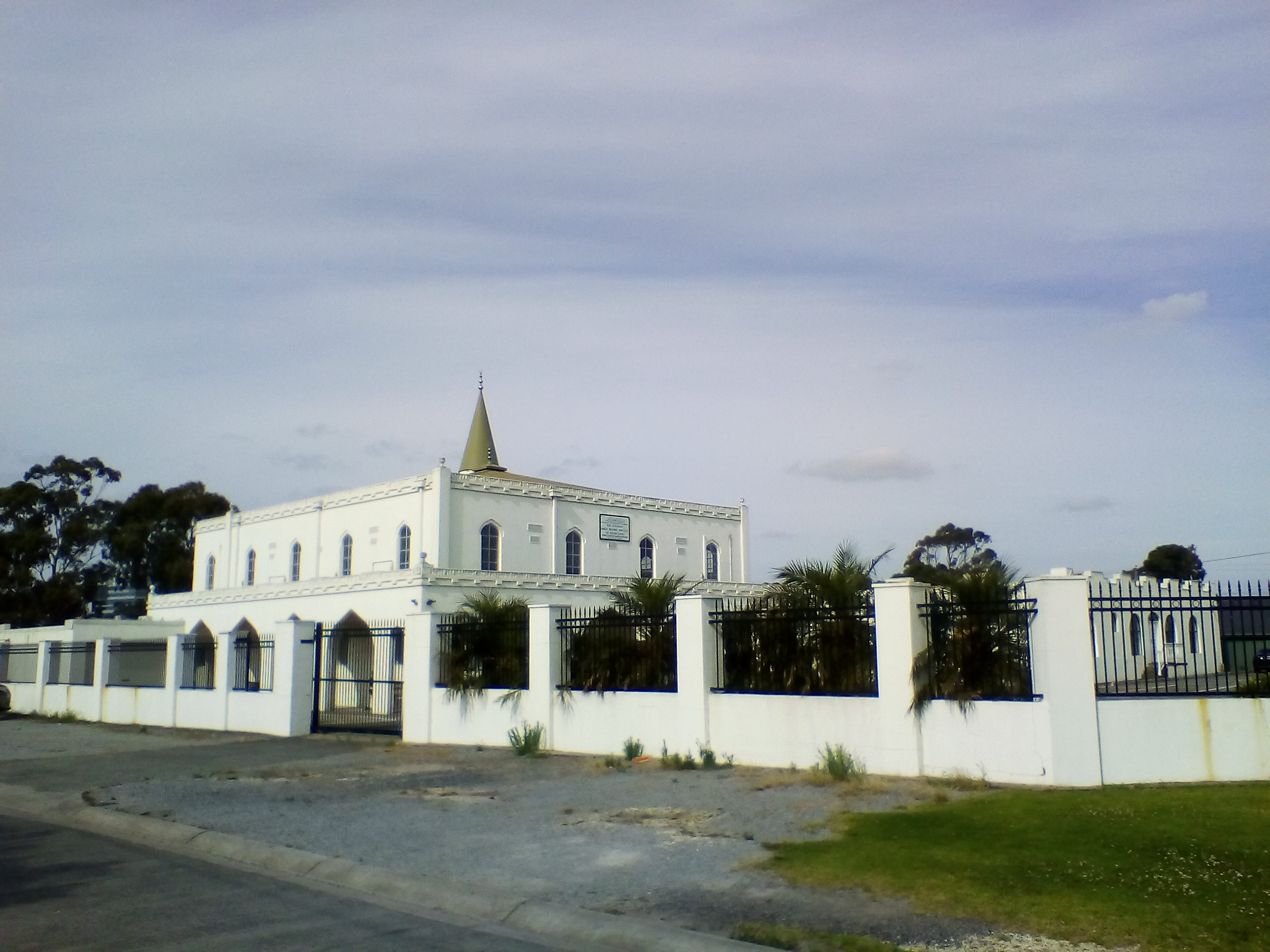
View from Canberra Ave.

== See also ==
- Islam in Australia
- List of mosques in Australia
