= Kišava =

Kišava Кишава Këshavë
- Village
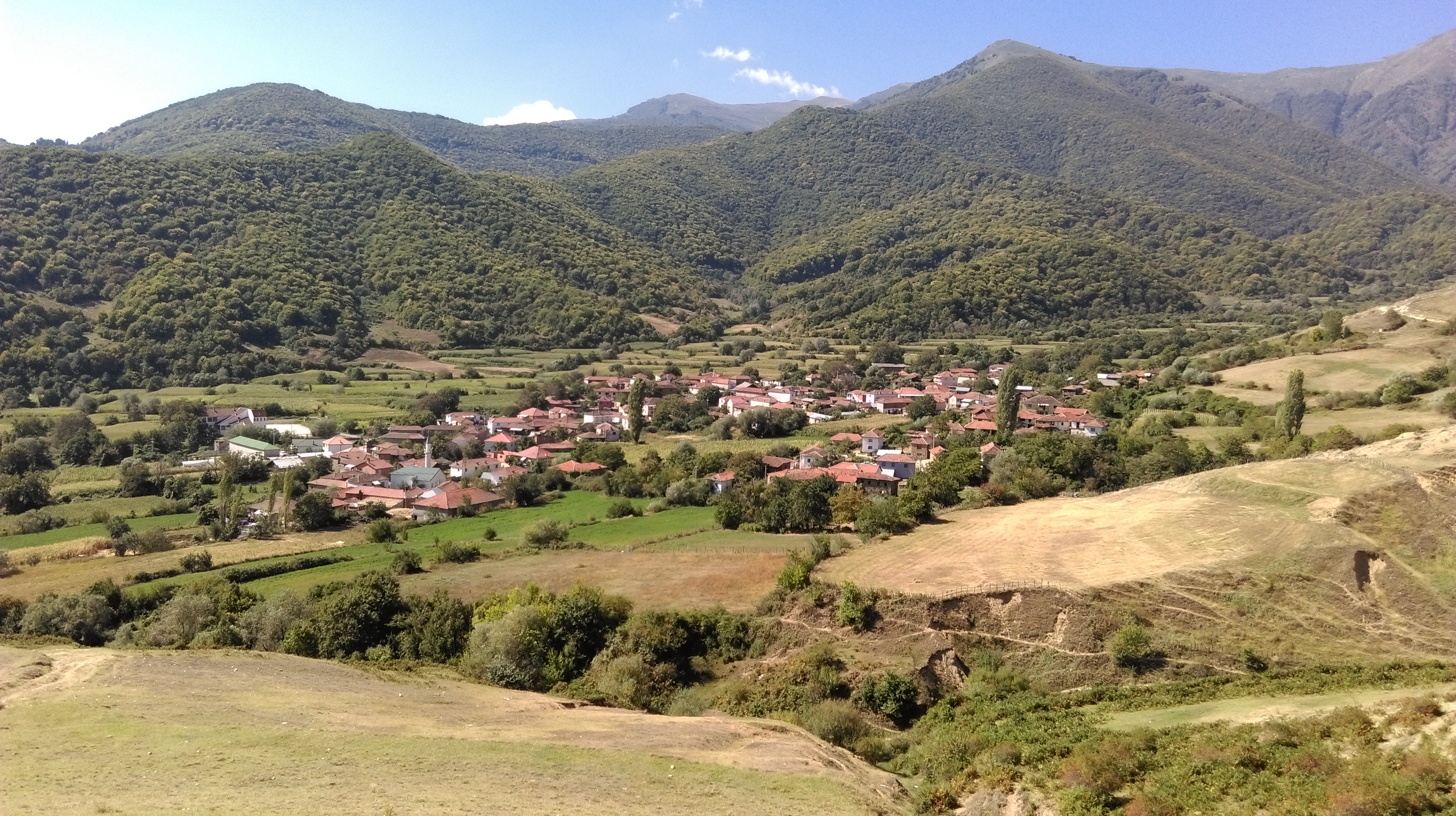
- Kišava

- Location within North Macedonia
- Coordinates: 40°52′59″N 21°19′0″E
- Country: North Macedonia
- Region: Pelagonia
- Municipality: Bitola
- Elevation: 881 m (2,890 ft)

Population (2021)
  - Total: 185
- Time zone: UTC+1 (CET)
  - Summer (DST): UTC+2 (CEST)
- Postal code: 7223
- Area code: +389 047
- Car plates: BT
- Website: .

Kišava, (Macedonian: Кишава, Albanian: Këshavë) is a village in the municipality of Bitola, North Macedonia. It used to be part of the former municipality of Bistrica.

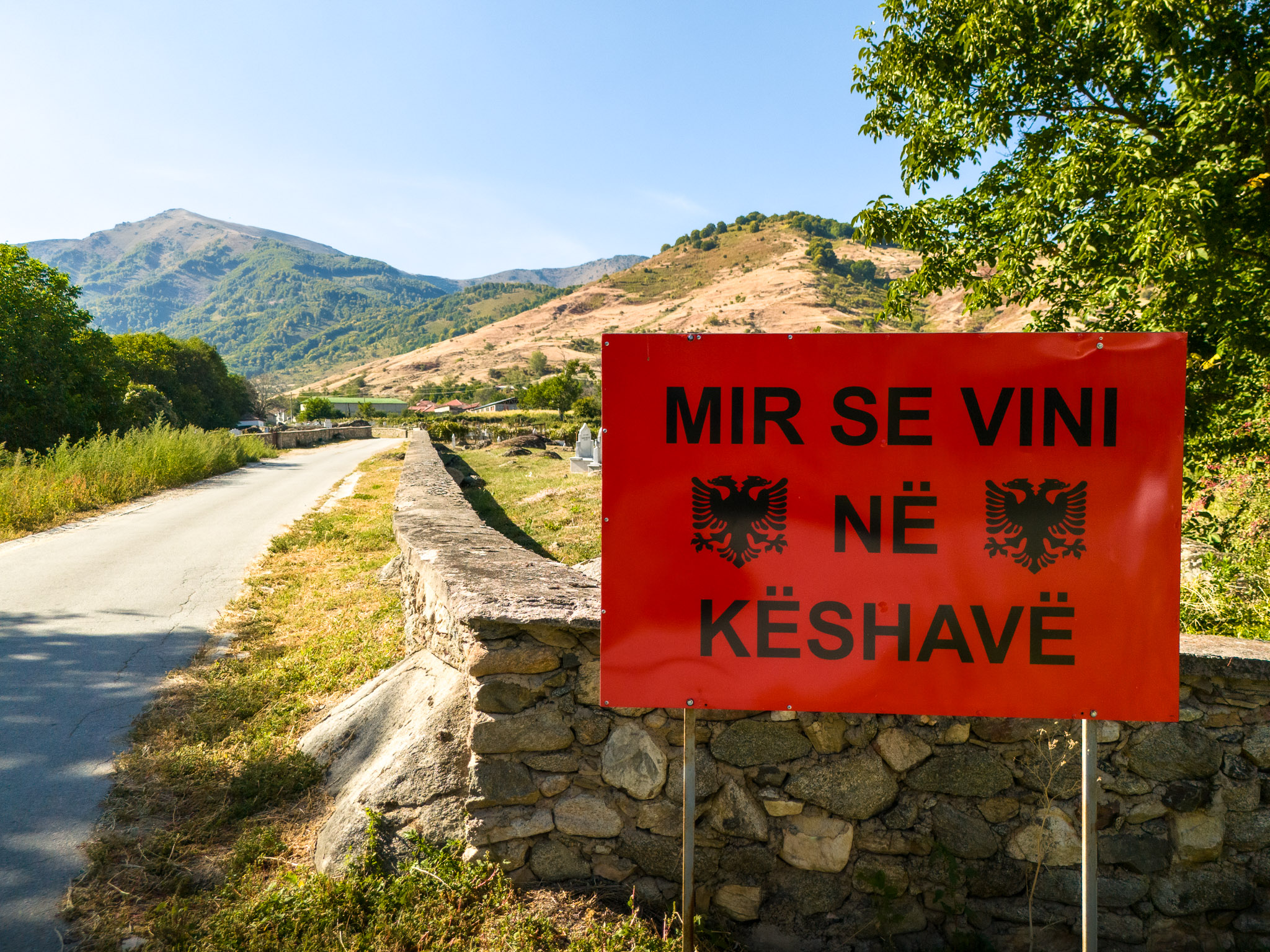
Photograph of the entrance to the village of Këshavë (Kišava), showing the main sign reading "Mirë Se Vini Në Këshavë" ("Welcome to Këshavë"). 2025

== Geography ==
Kišava is a mountainous village, close to the border with Greece. The Kišava river flows through the middle of the village. Kišava has three water springs, twelve water wells and some minor water sources surrounding the village. There are seven neighbourhoods: Xhamis, Barakalar, Grabovska, Merkan, Vilajetli, Luma and Çeshma.

== History ==
In Ottoman documents, Kišava between the 17th and 18th centuries is listed as a Christian village. Traditions among some neighbouring villages such as Dragoš referred to that population being of Slavic Christian origin. The village population dispersed to neighbouring settlements, leaving only the church.

In the early 19th century Kišava was repopulated by Muslim Albanian Tosks who originated from southern Albania and named the village after the early church, as "kisha" in Albanian means church. During the Ottoman period, Albanian villagers had extensive pastures on the Pelister mountain range and were herdsmen who owned many goats, while some also owned fields in the nearby valley of Bitola. A few owned chifliks (hereditary estates) in nearby villages such as Graešnica, Žabeni and others. Some people migrated from the village to Turkey in 1912, others left in the early 1950s and went to the provinces of Edirne, Izmir and others.

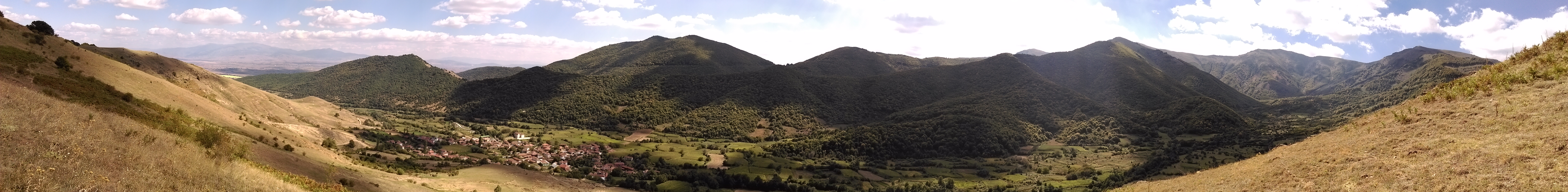
Panorama of Kišava showing the Pelagonia valley in the far west and the Baba mountains to far east

From 1963 onward, Albanians from Kišava migrated to Dandenong, a south-eastern Melbourne suburb in Victoria, Australia. Dandenong is home to a large diaspora from Kišava and various landmarks are named after the village like Dandenong's Albanian mosque, Keshava Reserve, a park honouring Albanian immigration to the area and Keshava Grove, a residential street.

== Demographics ==
Kišava is populated by Albanians.

As of the 2021 census, Kišava had 185 residents with the following ethnic composition:

- Albanians 169
- Persons for whom data are taken from administrative sources 16

According to the 2002 census, the village had a total of 308 inhabitants. Ethnic groups in the village include:

- Albanians 307
- Macedonians 1

== Culture ==
As Albanian Tosks, the speech and customs of Kišava villagers differs from nearby villages Ostrec and Zlokuḱani who are Ghegs (northern Albanians). Kišava villagers had close ties with the Albanians of Nižepole, due to cultural similarities.

Religious monuments are the Teqe of Sadik Baba, a mosque built in the 19th century and a Muslim graveyard. The village has a primary school.

In 2019, some members of the Kišava diaspora from Dandenong organised an ongoing annual festival Takimet e Keshavës (Kišava gathering) in Kišava, and is attended by the diaspora during their summer holidays in the village.

== Gallery ==
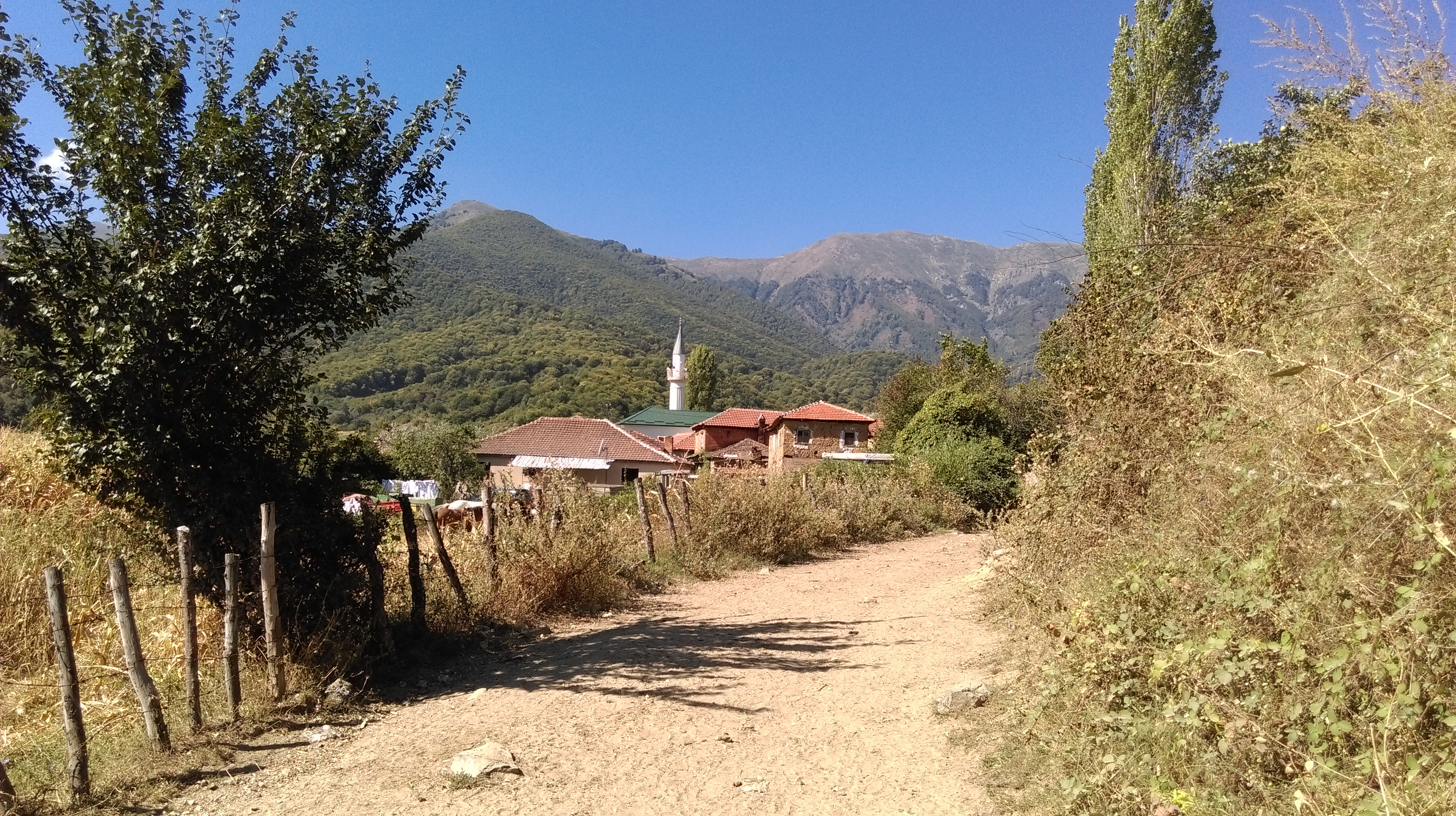
Kišava village

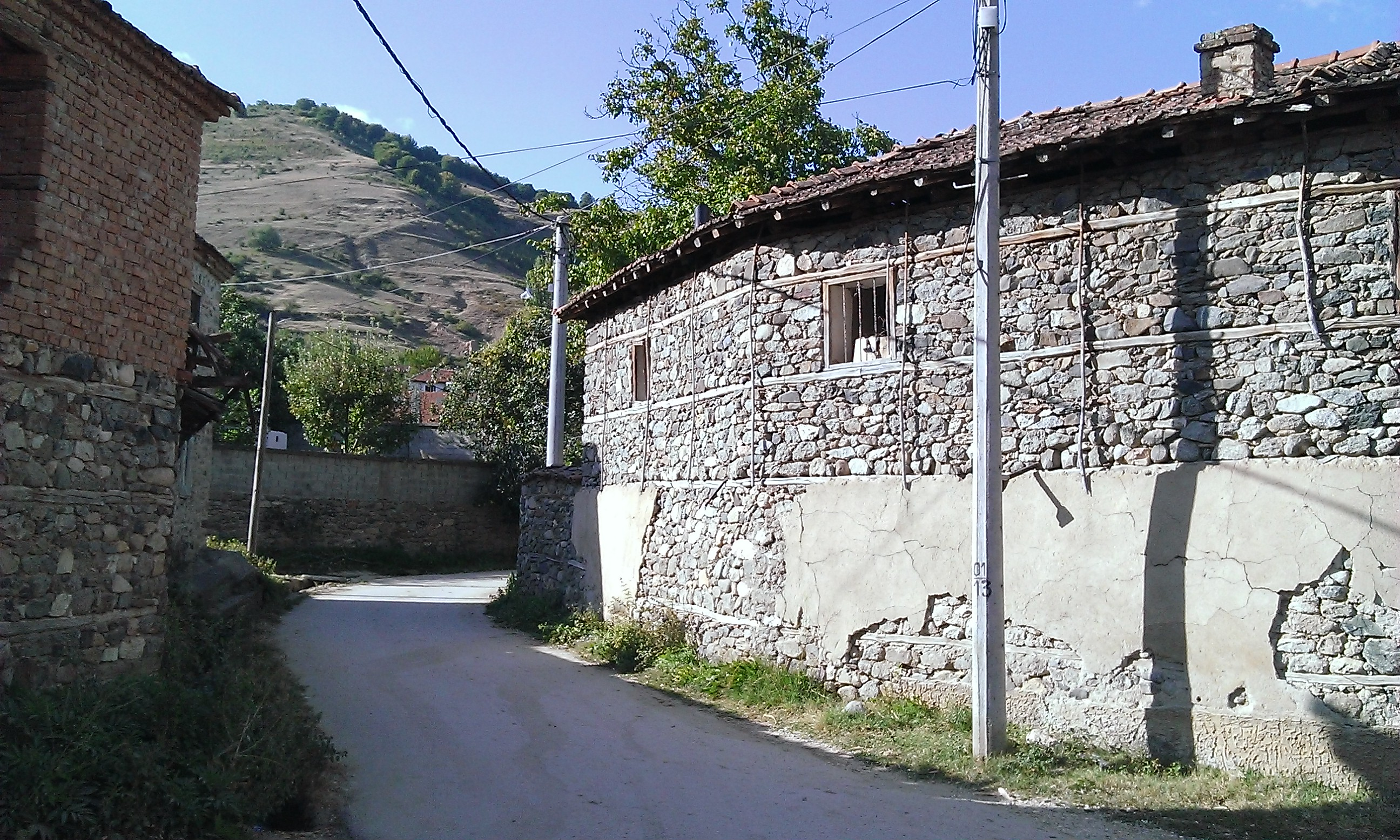
Traditional architecture of Kišava

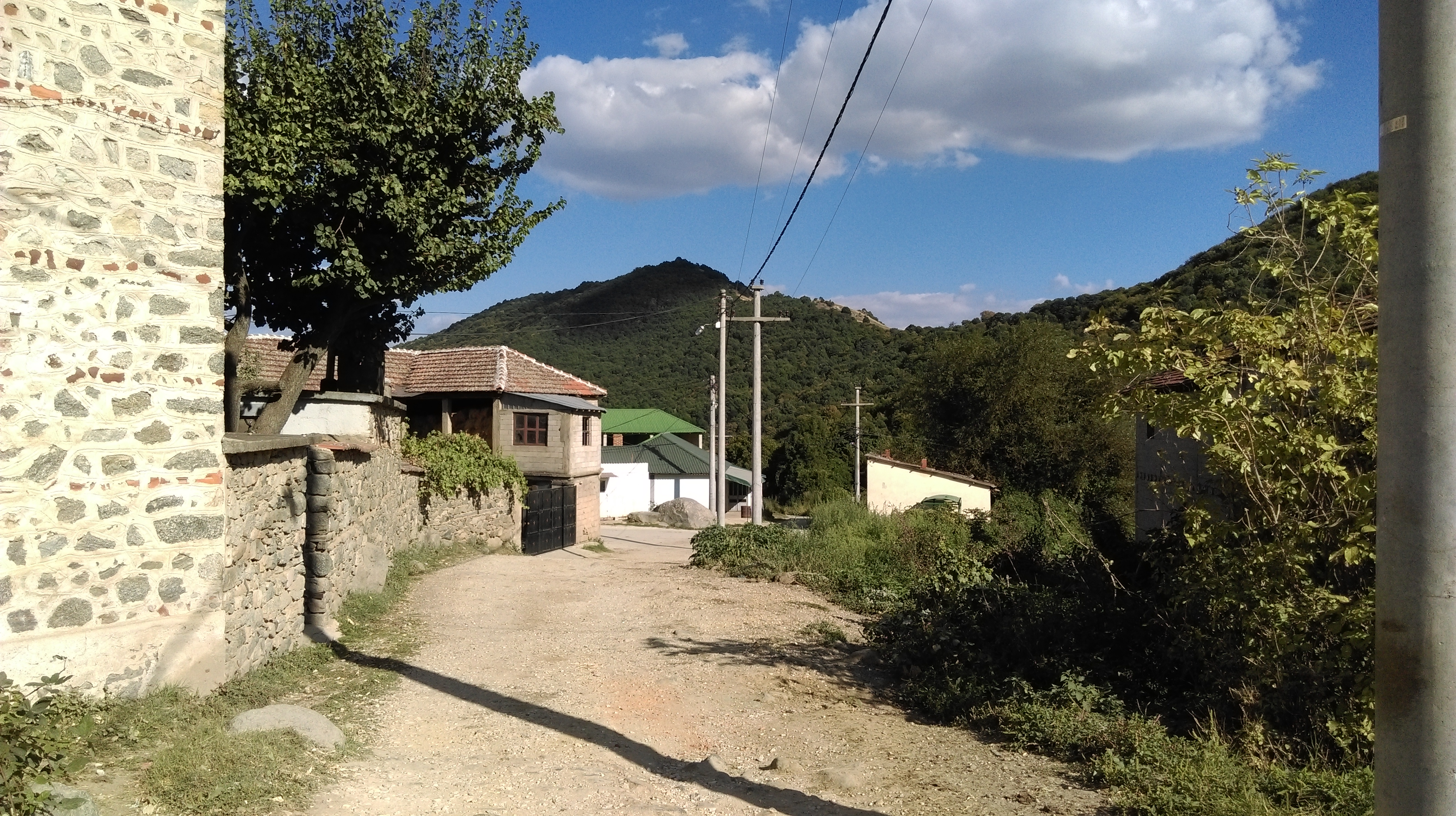
Road in Kišava

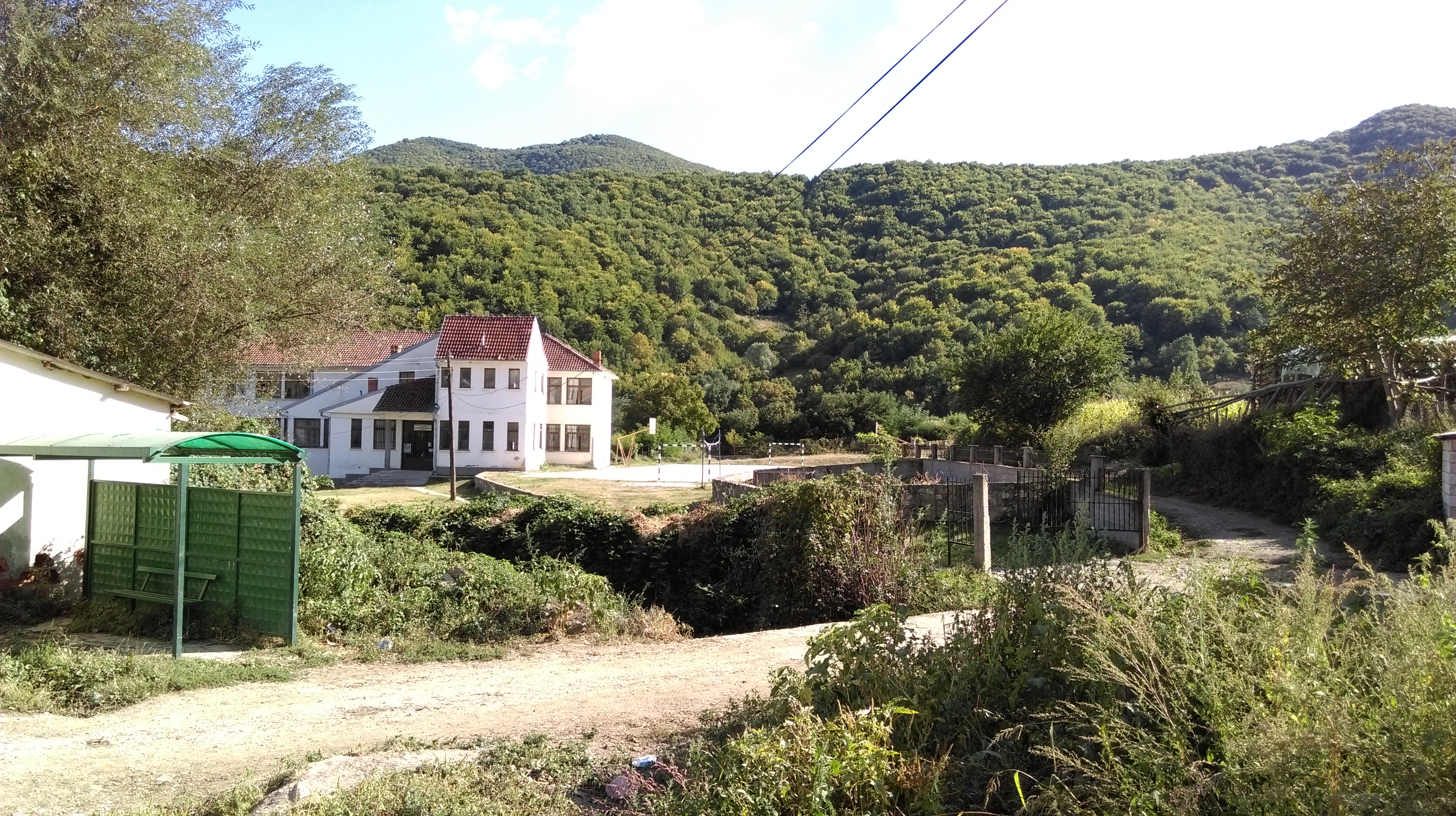
Primary school in Kišava

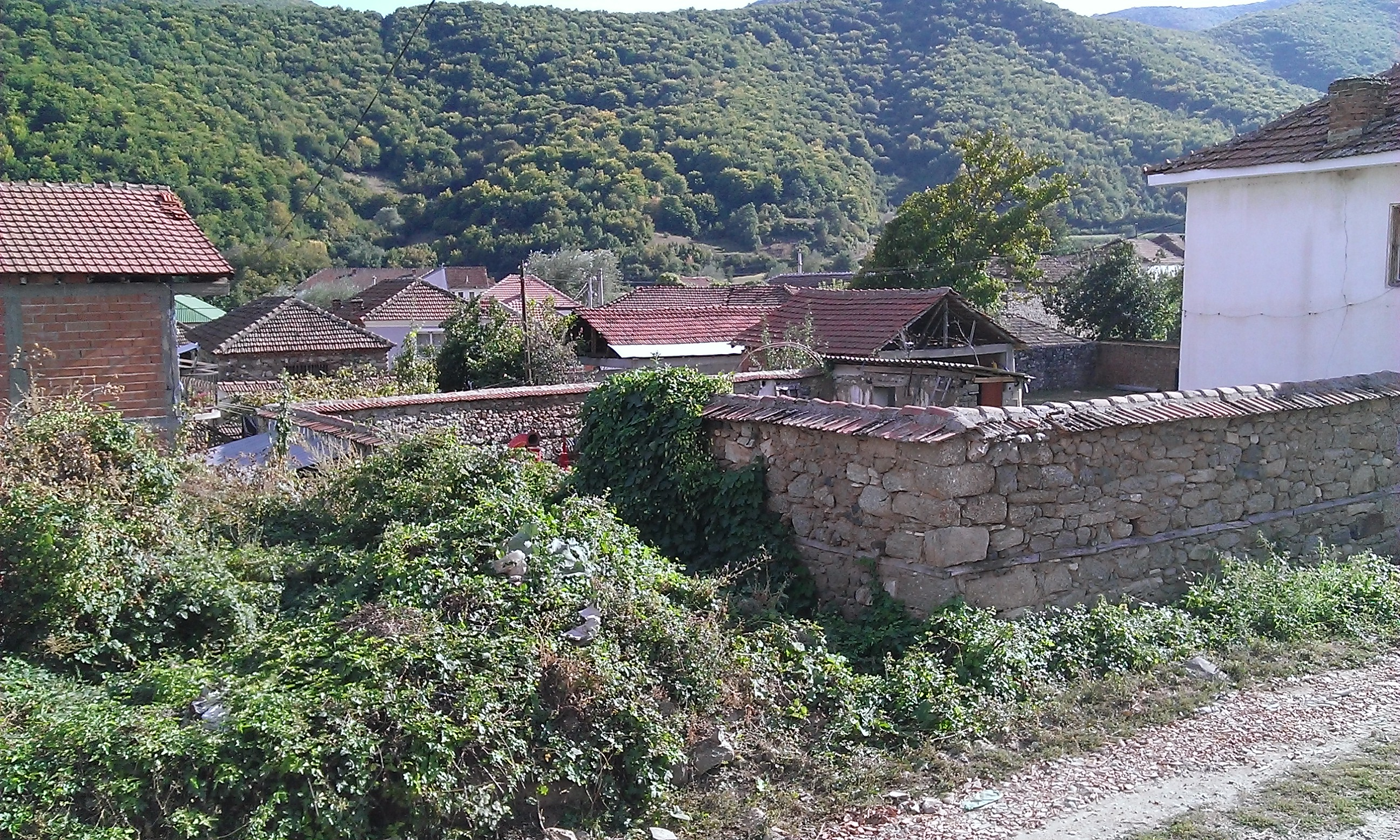
Houses in Kišava

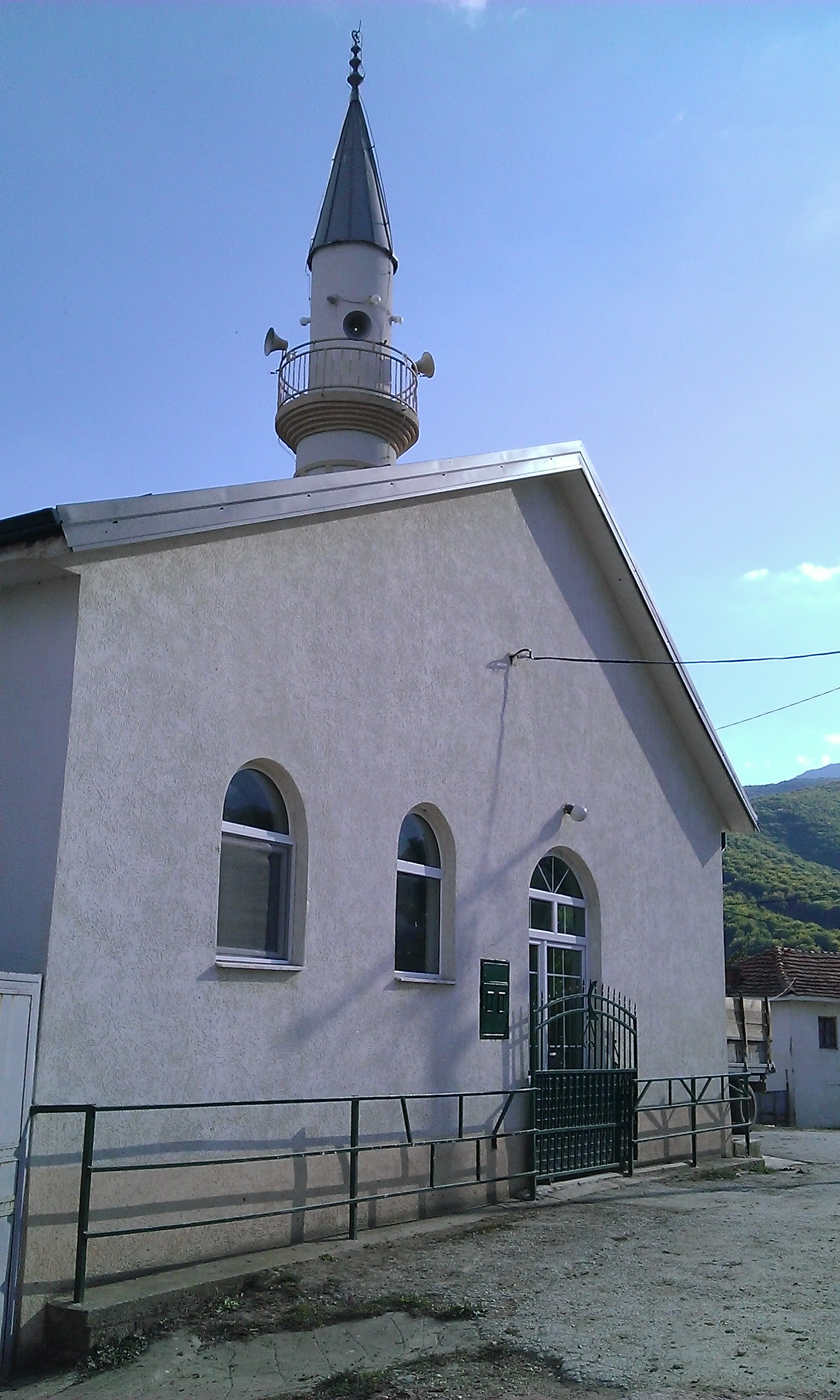
Mosque of Kišava

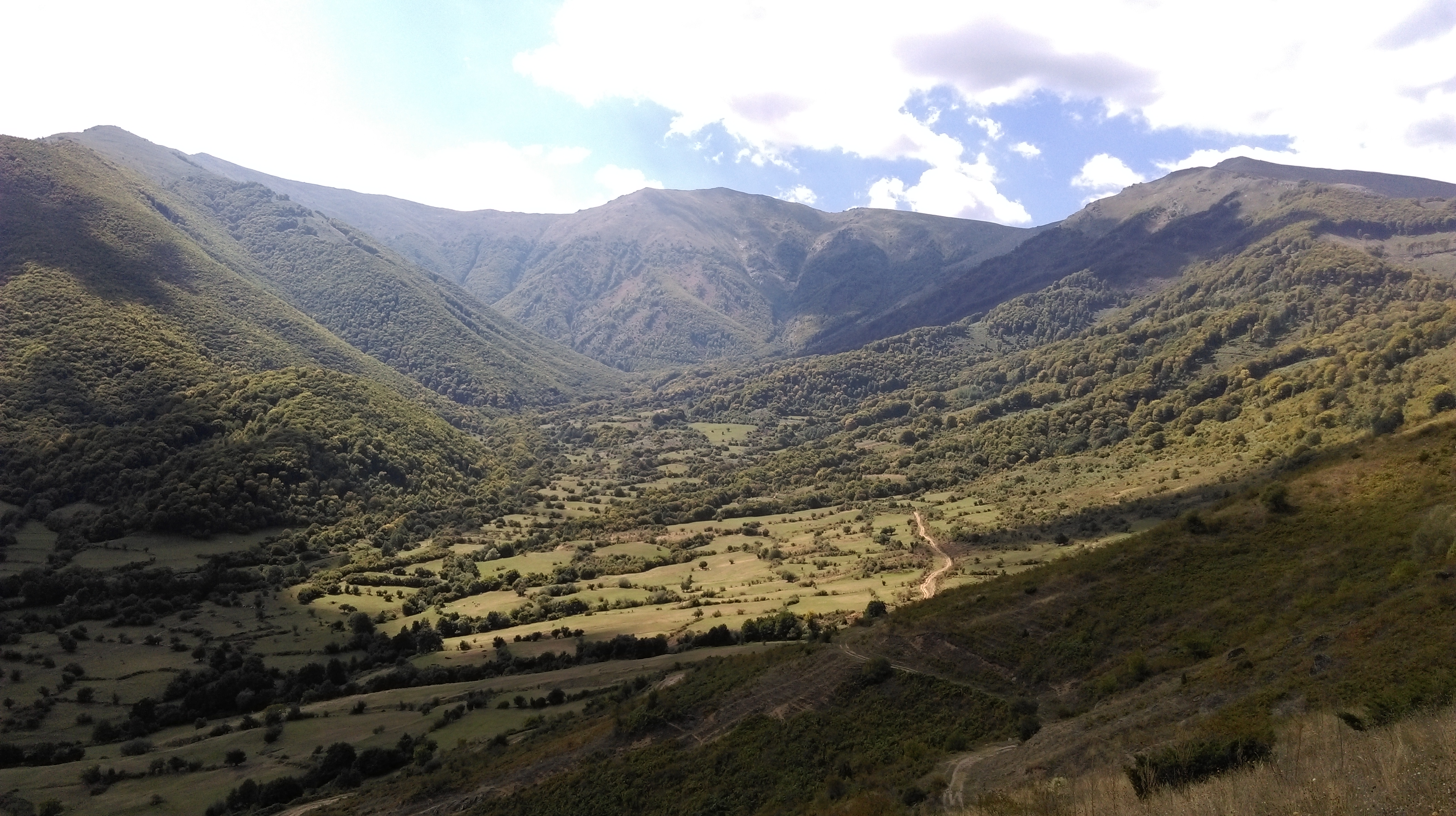
Fields of Kišava toward the Baba mountain range

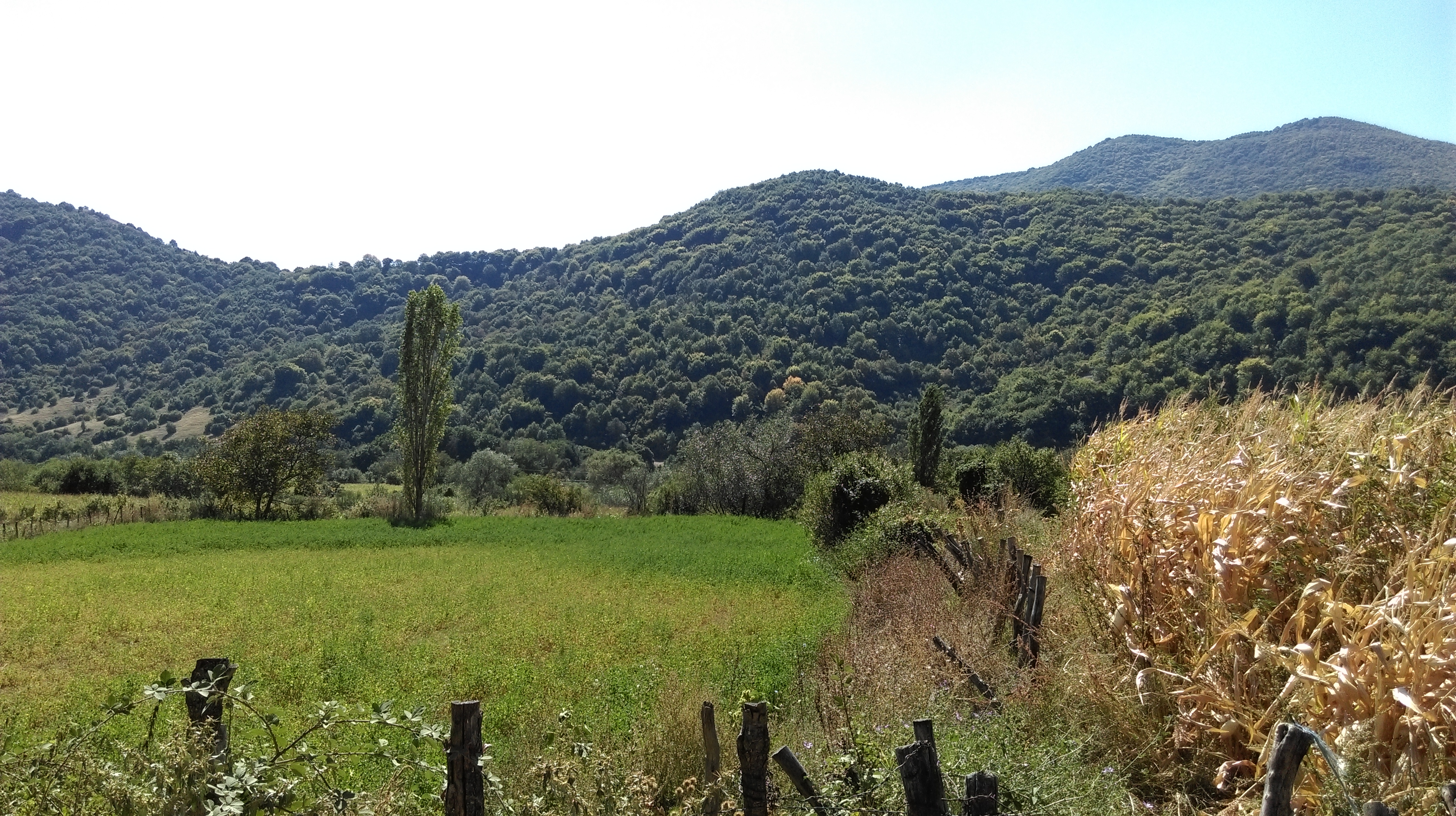
Fields of Kišava

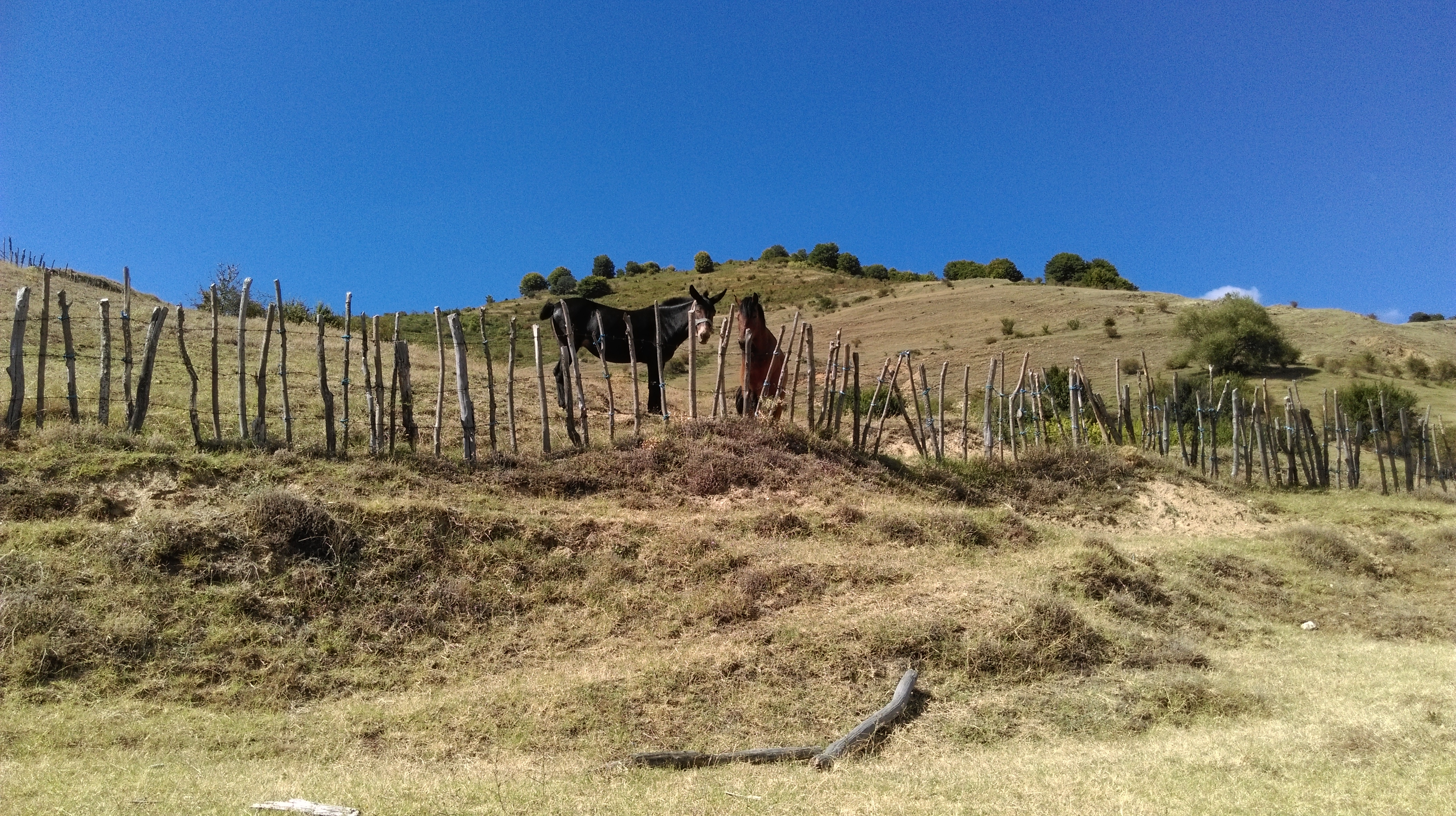
Horses grazing on Kišava mountain slope

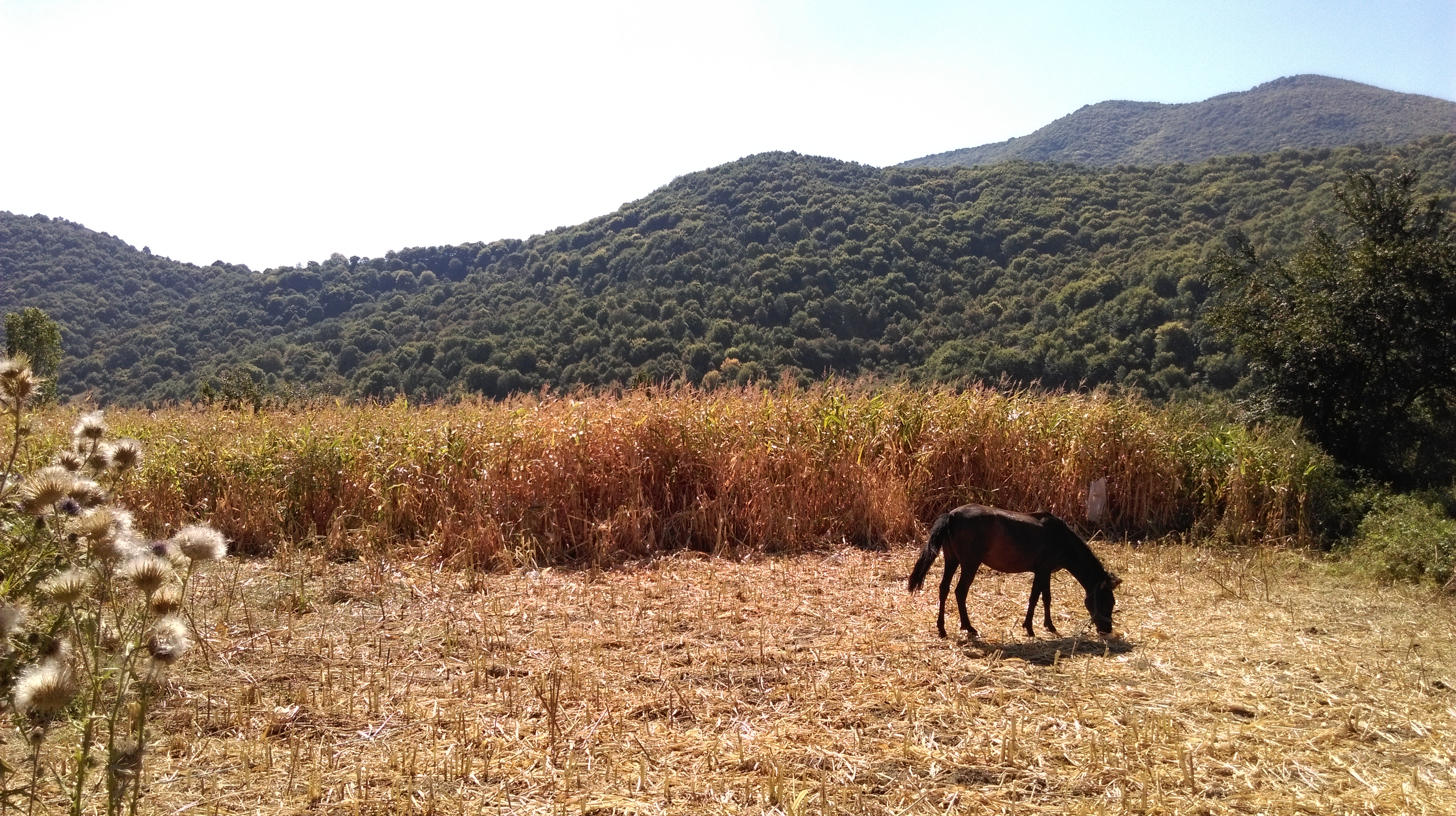
Horse grazing in Kišava field

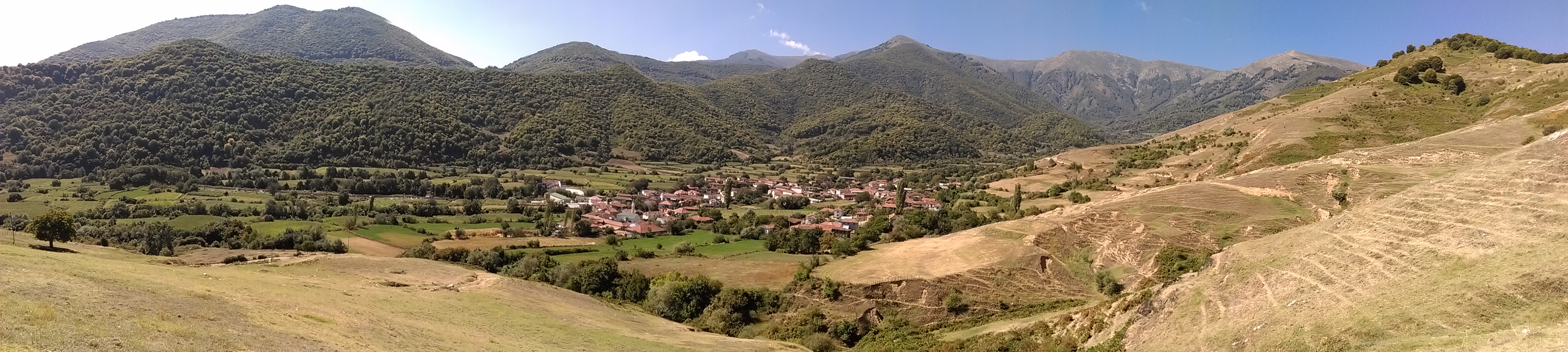
Kišava village
